= Lewis Bernard Golden =

British charity administrator

Lewis Bernard Golden (20 September 1878–11 November 1954) was a British charity administrator and first general secretary of Save the Children Fund from 1920 to 1937.

== Early life and career ==
Lewis Bernard Golden was born on 20 September 1878 in Saratov, Russia. He went to school at Prior Park College in Bath, England, and completed his education in Bonn, Germany. His early career was spent in the commercial sector, as general manager of the Anglo-Russian Trading Company. In 1917 he became St Petersburg correspondent for the Daily Mail. After the Russian Revolution in 1917, he and his wife fled Russia as refugees, and took up residence in Britain, where Golden had citizenship. Golden became secretary of Lady Muriel Paget's mission to Czecho-Slovakia.

== Work for Save the Children Fund ==
In 1920 L. B. Golden was appointed general secretary of Save the Children Fund, which had been founded in May 1919 to alleviate child starvation in post-war Europe. As the Fund's first general secretary, he worked closely with its founders, Dorothy Buxton and Eglantyne Jebb, who recruited him with a view to establishing the charity on sustainable, business-like foundations. As a salaried member of staff, he took on work which Buxton had been undertaking on a voluntary basis. Whilst Jebb took responsibility for the organisation's policy and overall vision, Golden, with his managerial background, was relied upon to run the administrative side. Golden drove forward the Fund's publicity and fundraising agenda, by taking the innovative step of taking out full-page advertisements in daily newspapers. His particular achievement was the organisation of the Russian famine relief operation in 1921–1922. Despite criticism from those who believed that the severity of the famine was exaggerated, and those opposed to the feeding of "Soviet" children, the campaign was a success, with Save the Children Fund distributing over 121 million children's meals.

In the 1921 Golden visited Germany on behalf of the Fund, and in 1925 he made a tour of inspection of the Fund's work in the Near East and reported on the conditions of refugees in Bulgaria. He worked with Eglantyne Jebb to establish the International Save the Children Union (also known as Union Internationale de Secours aux Enfants) in Geneva, and was a committee member from 1925 to 1936. In 1931 he was appointed vice-president of the Governing Body and Commission for the Nansen International Office for Refugees.

Golden retired from the Fund in 1937 after a dispute with colleagues over the treatment of Basque refugee children.

== Later life and death ==
Golden lived in Kew until his death on 11 November 1954, aged 76. His funeral was held at St Mary's Roman Catholic Cemetery, Kensal Rise, on 16 November 1954.
