= Richard Jebb (journalist) =

English journalist (1874–1953)

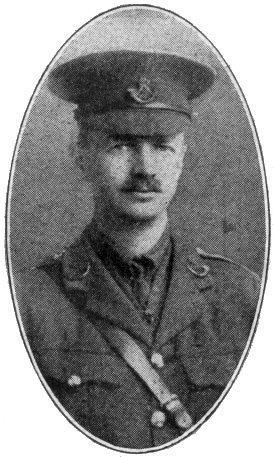
- Born: 1874
- Died: 25 June 1953 (aged 78–79)
- Education: Marlborough College; New College, Oxford
- Occupations: Journalist and author
- Parent(s): Arthur Trevor Jebb and Eglantyne Louisa Jebb
- Relatives: Louisa, Eglantyne and Dorothy (sisters); Richard Claverhouse Jebb (uncle)

Richard Jebb (1874 – 25 June 1953) was an English journalist and author in the field of Empire and colonial nationalism.

== Life ==
Richard Jebb was born in 1874. His parents were cousins Eglantyne Louisa Jebb (born Jebb) and Arthur Trevor Jebb. Richard's sister Louisa (Wilkins) established the forerunner of the Women's Land Army during the first world war. Another two of his sisters, Eglantyne and Dorothy (became Buxton), co-founded the children's international development agency Save the Children. Jebb was the nephew of the classical scholar and politician Sir Richard Claverhouse Jebb. He went to school at Marlborough College followed by New College, Oxford.

During the World War I, Jebb was a captain in the King's Shropshire Light Infantry, spending most of the war in England, serving as an instructor.
