= Norman Grosvenor =

British Liberal Party politician (1845–1898)

Captain The Honourable Norman Grosvenor

Member of Parliament for Chester
- In office 1869–1874 Serving with Henry Cecil Raikes
- Preceded by: Earl Grosvenor; Henry Cecil Raikes
- Succeeded by: Henry Cecil Raikes; John George Dodson

Personal details
- Born: Norman de l'Aigle Grosvenor; 22 April 1845
- Died: 21 November 1898 (aged 53)
- Spouse: Caroline Stuart-Wortley (m. 1881)
- Relations: Robert Grosvenor, 2nd Baron Ebury (brother); Henry Wellesley, 1st Baron Cowley (grandfather); Robert Grosvenor, 1st Marquess of Westminster (grandfather)
- Children: Susan Buchan, Baroness Tweedsmuir
- Parent(s): Robert Grosvenor, 1st Baron Ebury; Hon. Charlotte Wellesley

Captain The Honourable Norman de l'Aigle Grosvenor (22 April 1845 – 21 November 1898), was a British Liberal Party politician.

== Early life ==
Grosvenor was one of five sons and two daughters born to Robert Grosvenor, 1st Baron Ebury and the former Hon. Charlotte Wellesley. Robert Grosvenor, 2nd Baron Ebury, was his elder brother. Another brother, Thomas Grosvenor, married Sophia Williams (daughter of the American missionary Samuel Wells Williams).

His father was the third son of Robert Grosvenor, 1st Marquess of Westminster and the former Lady Eleanora Egerton (a daughter of Earl of Wilton). A member of the Grosvenor family headed by the Duke of Westminster, his uncle was Richard Grosvenor, 2nd Marquess of Westminster, while Hugh Grosvenor, 1st Duke of Westminster, and Richard Grosvenor, 1st Baron Stalbridge, were his first cousins. His mother was the eldest daughter of eldest daughter of Henry Wellesley, 1st Baron Cowley.

== Career ==
He was returned to parliament at an unopposed by-election in December 1869 as a Member of Parliament (MP) for Chester, succeeding his cousin Earl Grosvenor, who had succeeded to the peerage. He did not stand again at the 1874 general election.

== Personal life ==
Grosvenor married Caroline Susan Theodora, daughter of James Stuart-Wortley, in 1881. Her father was the Solicitor General under Lord Palmerston and Caroline, herself, was a novelist and artist who led the Women's Farm and Garden Union. They were the parents of two daughters:

- Susan Charlotte Grosvenor (1882–1977), who married John Buchan, 1st Baron Tweedsmuir.
- Margaret Sophie Katherine Grosvenor (1886–c. 1981), who married Jeremy Peyton-Jones, son of Peyton Peyton-Jones.

Grosvenor died, aged 53, on 21 November 1898. His wife died on 7 August 1940.

=== Descendants ===
Through his daughter Susan, he was the grandfather of Alice Buchan, John Buchan, 2nd Baron Tweedsmuir, William Buchan, 3rd Baron Tweedsmuir, and Alastair Francis Buchan, two of whom would spend most of their lives in Canada.

Parliament of the United Kingdom
Preceded by Earl Grosvenor; Henry Cecil Raikes	Member of Parliament for Chester; 1869 – 1874; With: Henry Cecil Raikes	Succeeded by Henry Cecil Raikes; John George Dodson
