= Home Arts and Industries Association =

British voluntary organisation, part of the Arts and Crafts Movement

The Home Arts and Industries Association was part of the Arts and Crafts Movement in Britain. It was founded in 1884 by Eglantyne Louisa Jebb, mother of Save the Children founders, Dorothy Buxton and Eglantyne Jebb and Louisa Wilkins who helped start the Women's Land Army.

== History ==
The initial name, changed in 1885, was the "Cottage Arts Association". Jebb was inspired by an initiative of Charles Godfrey Leland in Philadelphia. Another leading member was the designer Mary Fraser Tytler. The organisation sought to revive traditional rural crafts which were threatened by the mechanisation of production and by increasing urbanization.

In conformity with the thinking of John Ruskin and with Arts and Crafts philosophy, supporters believed that flourishing traditional crafts helped sustain rural communities and provided workers with far more personal satisfaction than was possible for factory workers. The Association funded schools and organised marketing opportunities for craftspeople. By 1889 it had 450 classes, 1,000 teachers and 5,000 students.

== Activities ==
The first of the Associations’ annual exhibitions took place in July 1885 and by 1888 were large enough to take place in the Royal Albert Hall, an annual occurrence until 1913. In 1890 the Association moved their offices to the Hall as tenants of the building and continued their work of funding schools and organising marketing opportunities for craftspeople.

In 1904 the Art Workers Quarterly said the association, '…is a society for teaching the working classes handicrafts such as wood carving, inlaying, metal repousse, basket weaving, leather work, book binding, and for encouraging these and others such as lace, embroidery spinning, weaving, pottery etc., by means of an annual exhibition'.

== See also ==
- Arts and Crafts Exhibition Society
