= Eglantyne Louisa Jebb =

Irish social reformer

- Born: Eglantyne Louisa Jebb; 1845/1846; Dublin, Ireland
- Died: 6 November 1925; Sussex, England
- Occupation: Social reformer
- Spouse: Arthur Trevor Jebb
- Children: 6, including Louisa, Richard, Eglantyne and Dorothy
- Relatives: Richard Claverhouse Jebb (brother)

Eglantyne Louisa Jebb (née Jebb; 1845/1846 – 6 November 1925) was an Anglo-Irish social reformer. A keen supporter of the Arts and Crafts movement, in 1884 she founded the Home Arts and Industries Association as a way of reviving country crafts and overcoming rural poverty.

== Biography ==
Eglantyne Louisa Jebb was born in 1845 or 1846 in Dublin to Emily Harriet (née Horsley) and Robert Jebb. She had an elder brother, who would become the classicist Sir Richard Claverhouse Jebb, and younger twin siblings, Heneage Horsley Jebb and Robert Jebb.

Her father was a Queen's Counsel of the Irish Bar and studied literature. His family included Sir Joshua Jebb, a prison reformer; Oxford Movement pioneer, John Jebb, Bishop of Limerick; and court physician, Sir Richard Jebb. Her mother was the daughter of the Dean of Brechin, Rev. Heneage Horsley.

In 1850, the family moved to Killiney, due to the delicate health of the twins. From an early age, she was called Tye and studied art and poetry. In 1871, she married her cousin Arthur Trevor Jebb (1839–1894), a barrister and landowner from Ellesmere, Shropshire.

The couple's first child, Emily was born in 1872 and the following year, Jebb gave birth to another daughter, Louisa, or "Lill". Their son, Richard, known as Dick, was born in 1874; followed by Eglantyne in 1876; Arthur in 1879; and Dorothy in 1881.

In 1884, Jebb founded the Cottage Arts Association to create a network for craft education throughout England and assist in philanthropic efforts to overcome poverty in rural areas. She renamed the organization in 1885 as the Home Arts and Industries Association.

The organization sponsored courses in craftwork, specifically woodworks and wearable items. The idea behind the programs was to provide education and training on art production to help people make a living, but also to build appreciation for the beauty of handicrafts.

Jebb was able to secure patrons such as Earl Brownlow and his wife, Countess Adelaide; Katherine Grosvenor, Duchess of Westminster; and Louisa Beresford, Marchioness of Waterford. They helped provide not only funding for the schools, but exhibition spaces for the goods to be shown to society figures. She ran the organization until 1887, when health concerns forced her to withdraw from active participation, though she did continue to organize free classes.

After her husband's death in 1894, Jebb resided with her unmarried daughter and namesake, Eglantyne, in Cambridge. A further health issue caused them to move to the Swiss Riviera in 1910, travelling between health spas in Austria, Italy and Switzerland.

Eglantyne supported her daughter's 1913 trip to the Balkan states.

During the war, Eglantyne agreed to collect, distribute, and monitor funds for the Macedonia Relief Fund. Jebb contributed £50 to the relief efforts.

== Death and legacy ==
Jebb died on 6 November 1925 in Sussex, England. Two of her daughters, Eglantyne and Dorothy, founded the Save the Children Fund, and Eglantyne Jebb also wrote the Declaration of the Rights of the Child.
