= Caroline Grosvenor =

English painter (1858–1940)

Caroline Grosvenor CBE
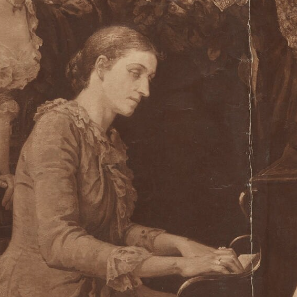
- detail from 'Five daughters of Jane Stuart-Wortley' 1884
- Born: Caroline Susan Theodora Stuart-Wortley; 15 June 1858; Westminster, London, England
- Died: 7 August 1940 (aged 82)
- Spouse: Norman Grosvenor

Caroline Susan Theodora Grosvenor CBE (née Stuart-Wortley; 15 June 1858 – 7 August 1940) was a British novelist, administrator and artist. She founded the Colonial Intelligence League for Educated Women and led the Women's Farm and Garden Union.

The daughter of the philanthropist Jane Stuart-Wortley and the politician James Stuart-Wortley, she was born in Westminster, London, and married Norman Grosvenor (died 1898), son of Robert Grosvenor, 1st Baron Ebury, in 1881. One of their daughters, Susan, married John Buchan, 1st Baron Tweedsmuir.

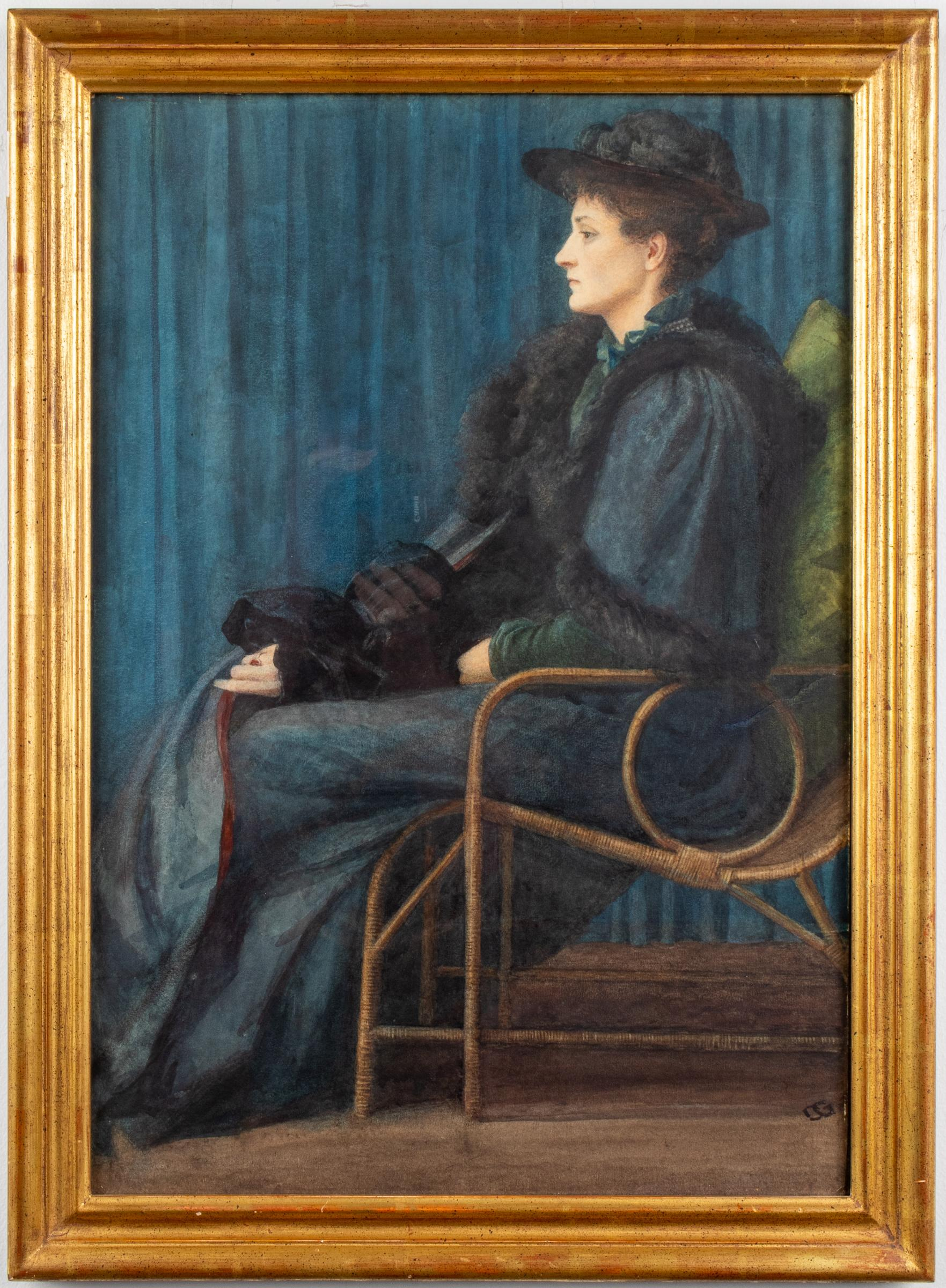
Portrait of Miss Risa Stillman from 1893 or 1894 by Caroline Grosvenor

Grosvenor wrote three novels: The Bands of Orion, The Thornton Device, and Laura (with her older brother, Charles Stuart-Wortley, 1st Baron Stuart of Wortley). Also with her brother Charles, in 1926 she wrote a two-volume family history: The first Lady Wharncliffe and her family (1779–1856). She was a well known miniature and watercolour painter. She founded the Colonial Intelligence League for Educated Women, which later amalgamated with the Society for Oversea Settlement of British Women, a subsidiary of the Colonial Office.

As the war ended, the Women's Farm and Garden Union, which had created the Women's Land Army, considered its future. One idea was to ready women for emigration but the chair "Mrs Norman Grosvenor" minuted that they would embark on a scheme of establishing small holdings for women. With the backing of the union, Louisa Wilkins and Katherine Courtauld established a set of small holdings in 1920 on Wire Mill Lane in Lingfield, Surrey.

Grosvenor was appointed Commander of the Order of the British Empire (CBE) in the 1920 New Year Honours for her services to emigrant British women.
