= Lady Tweedsmuir =

Lady Tweedsmuir may refer to:

- Priscilla Buchan, Baroness Tweedsmuir of Belhelvie - (1915 – 1978) - British Unionist and Conservative politician
- Susan Buchan, Baroness Tweedsmuir - (1882 – 1977) - British writer and the wife of author John Buchan
