= Chester by-election =

Chester by-election may refer to several elections in Chester, England:

- 1869 Chester by-election, following the elevation to the peerage of Hugh Grosvenor
- 1916 Chester by-election, following the resignation of Robert Yerburgh
- 1940 City of Chester by-election, following the death of Sir Charles Cayzer
- 1956 City of Chester by-election, following the appointment of Basil Nield as Recorder of Manchester
- 2022 City of Chester by-election, following the resignation of Chris Matheson
