= Katherine Courtauld =

British farmer and women's suffrage advocate (1856-1935)

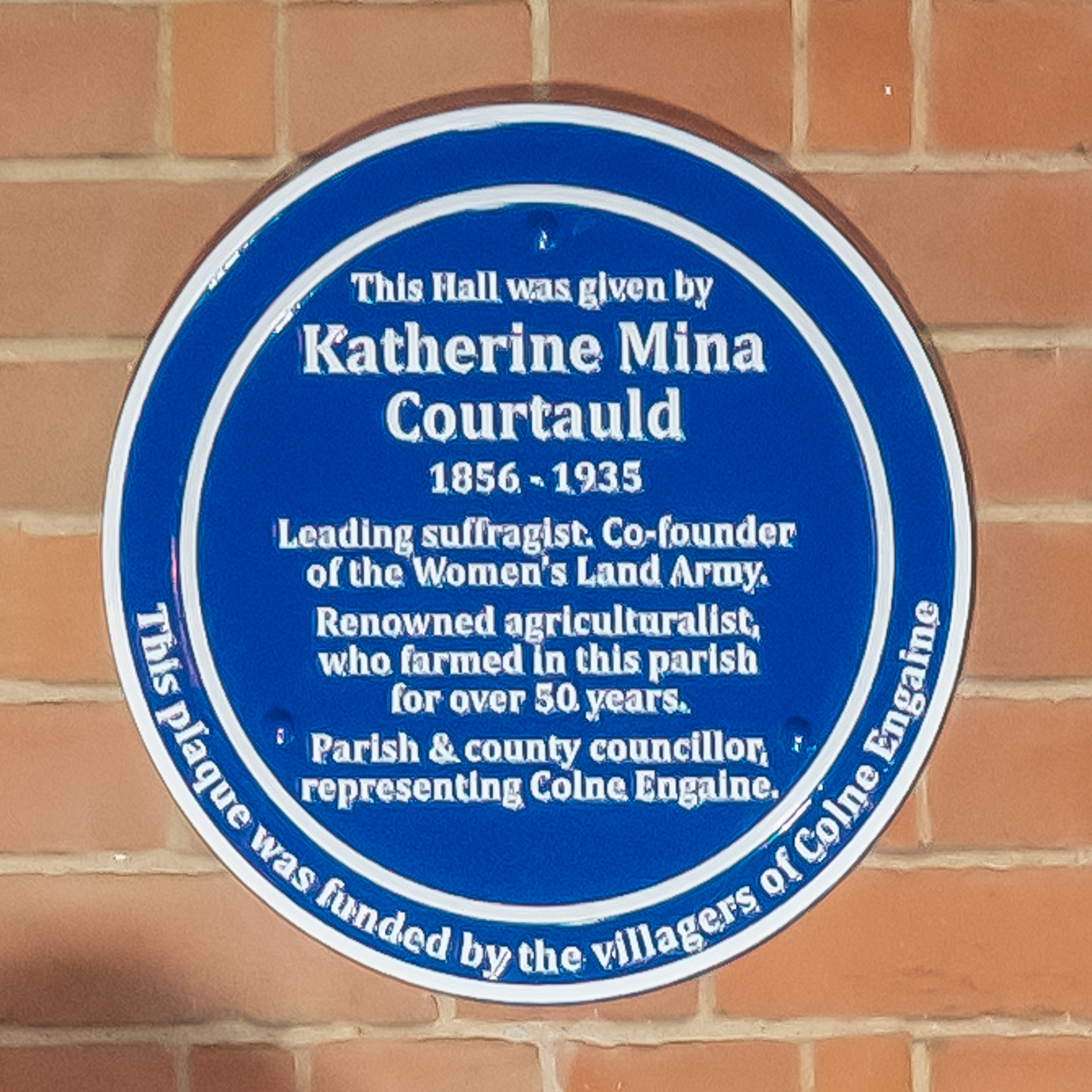
- Blue plaque to commemorate Katherine Mina Courtauld 1856–1935.
- Born: Katherine Mina Courtauld; 13 July 1856; High Garrett, Bocking, Essex, United Kingdom of Great Britain and Ireland
- Died: 5 July 1935 (aged 78); Knight's Farm, near Colne Engaine, Essex, United Kingdom of Great Britain and Northern Ireland
- Occupation: Agriculturalist
- Known for: Promoting training of women in agriculture
- Partner: Mary Gladstone
- Parents: George Courtauld; Mina Courtauld, née Bromley
- Family: Courtauld Family

Katherine Mina Courtauld (1856 - 1935) was a British farmer and suffragist. She was an advocate for providing training about agriculture for women. She was a member of the Courtauld family.

== Personal life ==
Courtauld was born on 13 July 1856 at High Garrett, Bocking, Essex in the UK. Her parents, George and Mina (née Bromley) Courtauld were part of the wealthy Courtauld family. She was the eldest child. She was a boarder at a private girls' school in Hampstead, London. She later sought and obtained training in practical and theoretical aspects of farming on her father's farms and through farm visits since, being a woman, she was unable to attend agricultural college. There were some lectures provided by Essex County Council that she was able to attend.

Courtauld was a supporter of women's suffrage. In the 1911 census she spoiled her return by writing at the bottom of the form 'As a householder and ratepayer I deeply resent being denied the privilege of a citizen in the exercise of the parliamentary franchise'.

She lived at Knights Farm with her partner, Mary Gladstone (1856–1941) for over 50 years. She participated in country sports and sailing in her own yacht, the Petrona.

She died, of cancer, at home on 5 June 1935.

== Career ==
When Courtauld was 21 her father bought her the 243 acre Knights Farm in Colne Engaine, Essex where she lived for the rest of her life. It was a mixed farm with a range of grain and fodder crops as well as dairy, beef, sheep, pigs and poultry. There was also a fruit orchard and its produce, especially apples, won prizes in agricultural competitions. By the 1900s she was well-known and featured in the agricultural press. She had women trainees on the farm and as well as running her own farm with its workforce of 15, also managed additional family estate land and other farms totalling 2,000 acres.

== Public activity ==
Courtauld was very active in public life both locally and nationally.

She was deeply involved with the Women's Farm and Garden Association from its inception in 1899 and a member of its founding council. She was its chair in 1907. She and Louise Wilkins were the proponents of the WFGA's idea to create small holdings for single women who had been in agriculture during the first world war. Wilkins had studied agriculture and had led recruitment for what became the Women's Land Army. Courtauld's financial support was a major factor that allowed the organisation to buy land near Lingfield, Surrey in 1920 to be let to women smallholders as an experiment in women's farming co-operation that lasted until the early 1930s. She also gave the organisation the freehold of Courtauld House in central London as its headquarters.

When the small holding initiative petered out in the 1930s it was put down to the deaths of Wilkins and Courtauld who had driven the idea along.

Among her many local activities were:

- President of the Essex Agricultural Show
- Parish councillor in the 1890s
- Secretary of the North-West Essex branch of the National Union of Women's Suffrage Societies before 1914
- Member of Essex County Council between 1914 and 1934
- In the 1920s she funded the building of a village hall in Colne Engaine (which was dedicated to her father)
- She paid for the restoration of Colne Engaine's St Andrew church tower
- She was a member of the East Essex hunt
