= International Save the Children Union =

International humanitarian organization (1920–1986)

The International Save the Children Union (French: L'Union Internationale de Secours aux Enfants, UISE) was a Geneva-based international organisation of children's welfare organisations founded in 1920 by Eglantyne Jebb and her sister Dorothy Buxton, who had founded Save the Children in the UK the previous year. The intention was to create 'a powerful international organisation, which would extend its ramifications to the remotest corner of the globe'.

The movement was granted the patronage of the International Committee of the Red Cross, and the Council included two prominent members of that body, including its Head of Secretariat, Etienne Clouzot. It brought together organisations from various countries that were initially working to tackle child suffering around Europe after World War I.

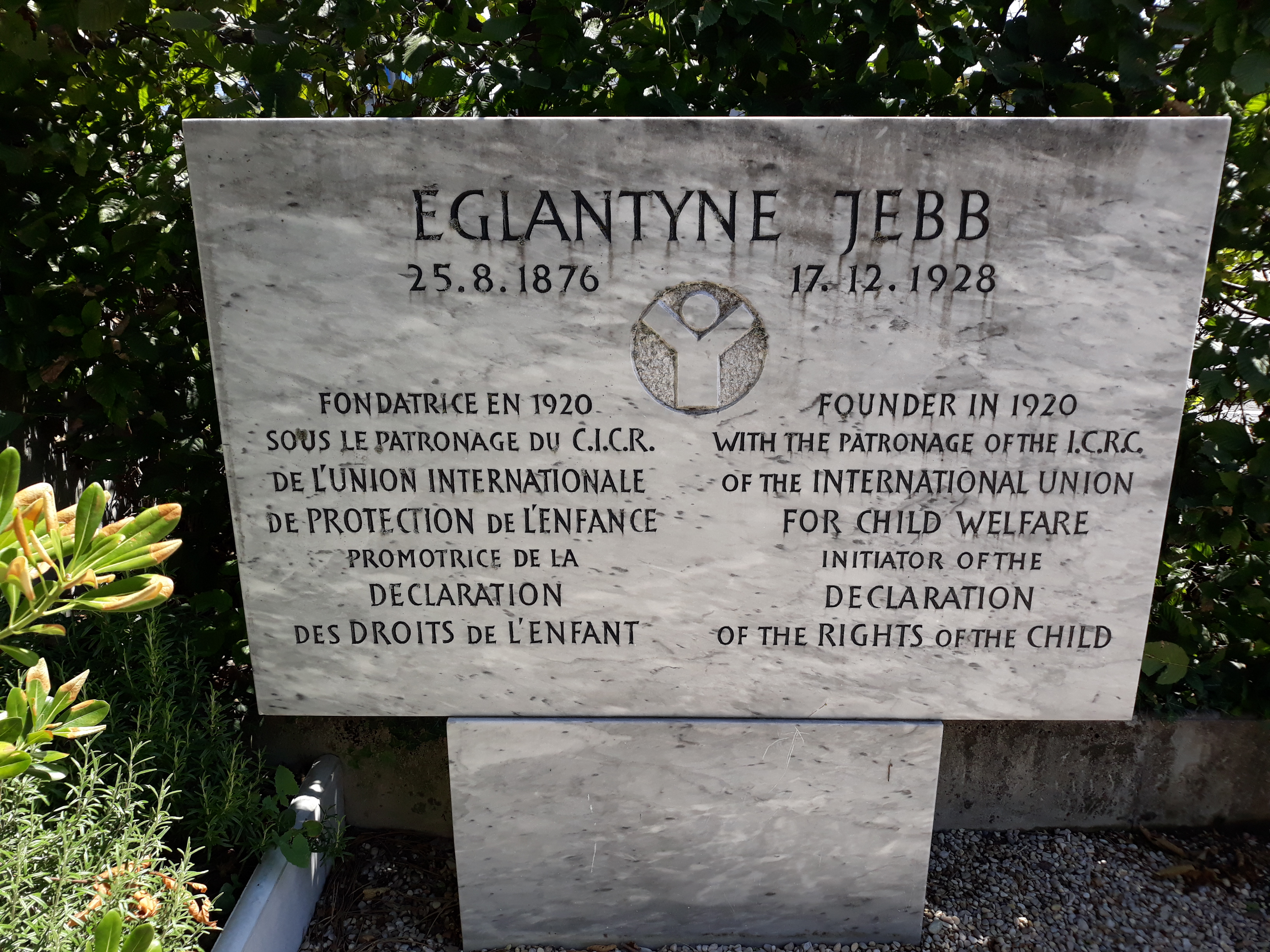
Memorial to Eglantyne Jebb on the ICRC site in Geneva

In 1923, it agreed, and then lobbied for, the Declaration of the Rights of the Child which was adopted by the League of Nations in the following year.

In 1946, it merged with the International Association for the Promotion of Child Welfare (founded 1921 in Brussels) to form the International Union for Child Welfare (French: Union internationale de protection de l'enfance).

In 1977, a number of Save the Children organisations formed the International Save the Children Alliance (renamed Save the Children International in 1997) to coordinate their international advocacy work.

In 1986, the General Council of the International Union for Child Welfare voted to disband the organisation, allegedly for reasons of financial mismanagement. Its papers and those of its predecessor bodies were deposited in the archives of the Canton of Geneva.
