= Robert Grosvenor, 2nd Baron Ebury =

British politician (1834–1918)

The Right Honourable The Lord Ebury
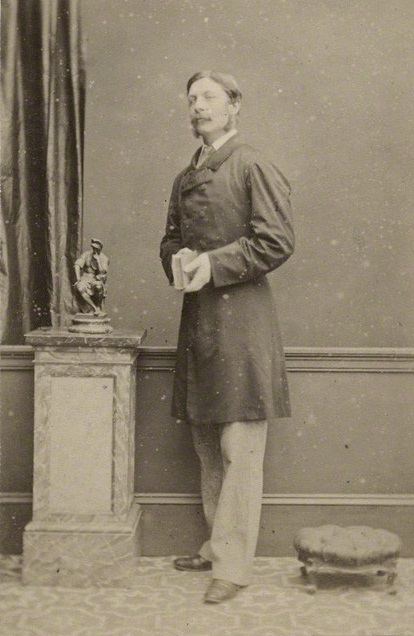

Member of Parliament for Westminster
- In office 1865–1874
- Preceded by: Sir George de Lacy Evans
- Succeeded by: Sir Charles Russell, Bt

Personal details
- Born: Robert Wellesley Grosvenor; 25 January 1834
- Died: 13 November 1918 (aged 84)
- Party: Liberal
- Spouse: Emilie Beaujolais White (after 1867)
- Relations: Norman Grosvenor (brother); Robert Grosvenor, 1st Marquess of Westminster (grandfather); Henry Wellesley, 1st Baron Cowley (grandfather)
- Children: 5
- Parent(s): Hon. Charlotte Arbuthnot Wellesley; Robert Grosvenor, 1st Baron Ebury.
- Education: Harrow School
- Alma mater: King's College London

Robert Wellesley Grosvenor, 2nd Baron Ebury (25 January 1834 – 13 November 1918) was a British politician.

== Early life and education ==
Ebury was the eldest of the five sons and two daughters of Robert Grosvenor, 1st Baron Ebury and his wife Hon Charlotte Arbuthnot Wellesley. His younger brothers were Thomas George Grosvenor, Norman Grosvenor (who represented Chester in Parliament), Algernon Henry Grosvenor, and barrister Richard Cecil Grosvenor.

Ebury's father was the third son of Robert Grosvenor, 1st Marquess of Westminster. His mother was the eldest daughter of the diplomat Henry Wellesley, 1st Baron Cowley, a younger brother of Arthur Wellesley, 1st Duke of Wellington. Among Robert's extended family were uncles Richard Grosvenor, 2nd Marquess of Westminster and Thomas Egerton, 2nd Earl of Wilton, while Hugh Lupus Grosvenor, 1st Duke of Westminster and Richard Grosvenor, 1st Baron Stalbridge were his cousins.

He was educated at Harrow School and King's College London.

Ebury played three first-class cricket matches for the Marylebone Cricket Club between 1861 and 1863.

Ebury succeeded to the barony upon his father's death in 1893.

== Career ==
Ebury entered the 1st Life Guards in 1853, became Captain in 1859 and was made Captain of the Cheshire Yeomanry in 1870. He served as Liberal Party Member of Parliament for Westminster from 1865 to 1874.

== Marriage and children ==
On 20 July 1867, Ebury married Hon Emilie Beaujolais White, daughter of Henry White, 1st Baron Annaly. They had six children:

- Robert Victor Grosvenor, 3rd Baron Ebury (28 June 1868 – 5 November 1921), married Florence Padelford, a daughter of Edward M Padelford, in 1908.
- Hon Hugh Grosvenor (8 October 1869 – 6 August 1900), a Second Secretary in the Diplomatic Service, died unmarried.
- Hon Maud Grosvenor (18 August 1874 – 2 June 1948), married Maurice George Carr Glyn, High Sheriff of Hertfordshire, second son of Hon Pascoe Glyn MP and grandson of George Glyn, 1st Baron Wolverton, in 1897.
- Gilbert Grosvenor (18 September 1878 – 16 February 1891)
- Hon Alice Katherine Sibell Grosvenor (26 September 1880 – 17 April 1948), married Ivor Guest, 1st Viscount Wimborne in 1902.
- Francis Egerton Grosvenor, 4th Baron Ebury (8 September 1883 – 15 May 1932), married Mary Adela Glasson, daughter of John Glasson, in 1902. Father of Robert Grosvenor, 5th Baron Ebury.

== Death ==
Ebury died in 1918 at the age of 84 and was succeeded in the barony by his eldest son, Robert.

== Arms ==
Coat of arms of Robert Grosvenor, 2nd Baron Ebury
Coronet A coronet of an Baron Crest A talbot statant or. Escutcheon Azure, a garb or; a mullet for difference. Supporters Two talbots reguardant or, collared azure and charged on the shoulder with a mullet of the second. Motto Virtus non stemma. (Virtue, not ancestry)

Parliament of the United Kingdom
Preceded by Sir George de Lacy Evans	Member of Parliament for Westminster; 1865–1874	Succeeded by Sir Charles Russell, 3rd Baronet
Peerage of the United Kingdom
Preceded by Robert Grosvenor	Baron Ebury; 1893–1918	Succeeded by Robert Grosvenor
