= Susan Buchan =

Vicereine of Canada; wife of John Buchan

The Right Honourable The Lady Tweedsmuir
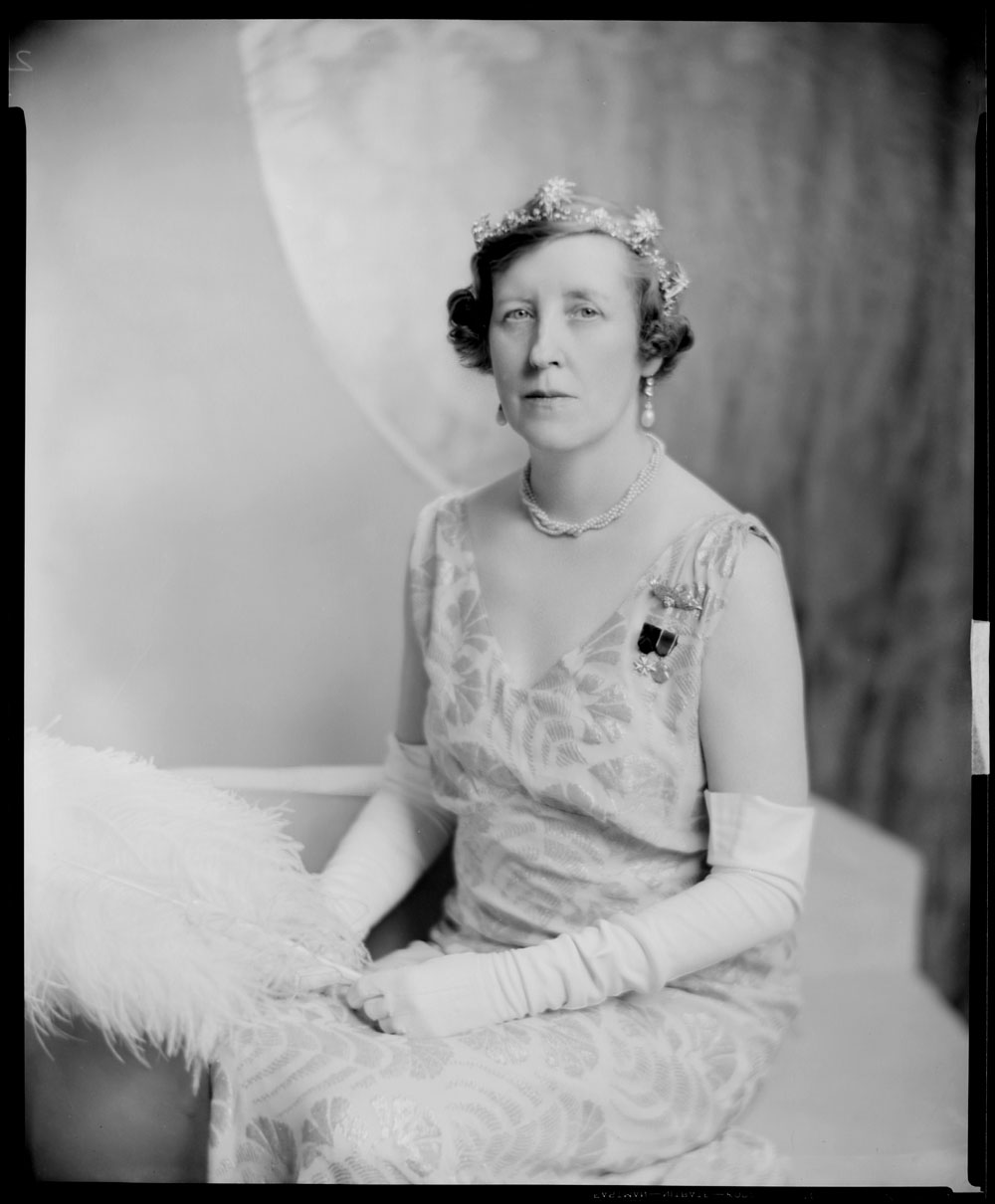
- Lady Tweedsmuir in 1937
- Born: Susan Charlotte Grosvenor; 20 April 1882; London, England
- Died: 22 March 1977 (aged 94); Burford, Oxfordshire, England
- Spouse: John Buchan (m. 1907; died 1940)
- Children: Alice; John; William; Alastair
- Parent(s): Norman de L'Aigle Grosvenor; Caroline Stuart-Wortley
- Writing career
- Genres: Fiction, history, biography

Susan Charlotte Buchan, Baroness Tweedsmuir (née Grosvenor; 20 April 1882 – 22 March 1977) was a British writer and the wife of author John Buchan. Between 1935 and 1940 she was viceregal consort of Canada while her husband was the governor general. She was also the author of several novels, children's books, and biographies, some of which were published under the name Susan Tweedsmuir.

== Life ==
Susan was born in Mayfair, London. She was a daughter of Norman de L'Aigle Grosvenor (son of the first Lord Ebury) and his wife Caroline Susan Theodora Stuart-Wortley (a granddaughter of the first Lord Wharncliffe), and a cousin of the Dukes of Westminster. She married John Buchan on 15 July 1907, and became the Baroness Tweedsmuir (known as Lady Tweedsmuir) when he was created Baron Tweedsmuir in 1935. The Buchans had four children, Alice, John, William, and Alastair, two of whom spent most of their lives in Canada.

She was a childhood friend of Virginia Stephen (later Virginia Woolf), and they remained friendly, although not always close, in adult life. The Hogarth Press, run by Leonard and Virginia Woolf, published a work of Lady Tweedsmuir's in 1935 and she was the recipient of one of the last letters Virginia Woolf wrote.

Her time as Vicereine of Canada is remembered for her energetic relief work. Her library project of gathering books in Eastern Canada for impoverished western communities and sending train carloads of them west was the foundation for many public libraries across the prairies.

Her interest in literary education influenced the establishment of the Governor General's Awards, for many years Canada's primary literary awards, and the library at Rideau Hall. Following her husband's death she returned to Britain, where she wrote several more novels, a series of memoirs, and a biography of her husband.

She died at Burford, near Oxford, on 22 March 1977 aged 94 and was buried beside her husband in the churchyard at Elsfield.

== Bibliography ==
- The Sword of State: Wellington after Waterloo (1928)
- Jim and the Dragon (1929)
- Lady Louisa Stuart: Her Memories and Portraits (1932)
- The Vision at the Inn: A Play in One Act (1933)
- Funeral March of a Marionette: Charlotte of Albany (1935)
- The Scent of Water (1937)
- Mice on Horseback (1940)
- Canada in The British Commonwealth in Pictures series (1941)
- The Cat's Grandmother (1942)
- The Silver Ball (1944)
- John Buchan by His Wife and Friends (1947)
- The Rainbow through the Rain (1950)
- The Lilac and the Rose (1952) memoirs vol. 1
- The Freedom of the Garden (1952)
- A Winter Bouquet (1954) memoirs vol. 2
- Cousin Harriet (1957)
- Dashbury Park (1959)
- A Stone in the Pool (1961)
- The Edwardian Lady (1966) memoirs vol. 3

Honorary titles
Preceded by The Countess of Bessborough	Viceregal consort of Canada; 1935–1940	Succeeded by The Countess of Athlone
