= Countess Cross =

Hamlet in Essex, England

Coordinates: 51.946°N 0.714°E

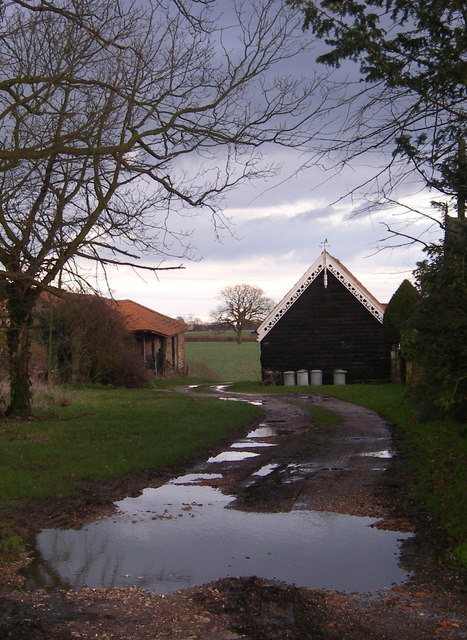
- "Barge boarding" farm buildings at Countess Cross

- Location within Essex
- Civil parish: Colne Engaine
- District: Braintree
- Shire county: Essex
- Region: East
- Country: England
- Sovereign state: United Kingdom
- Post town: COLCHESTER
- Police: Essex
- Fire: Essex
- Ambulance: East of England

Countess Cross is a hamlet in the civil parish of Colne Engaine, near the town of Halstead in the Braintree district, in the county of Essex, England.

== Other nearby settlements ==
Other nearby settlements include Boose's Green, Earls Colne, White Colne, Pebmarsh and Daw's Cross.

== Features ==
There is a wood called Little Wheatley Wood in Countess Cross.
