= Colne Engaine =

Village in Essex, England

Coordinates: 51.941302°N 0.69068°E

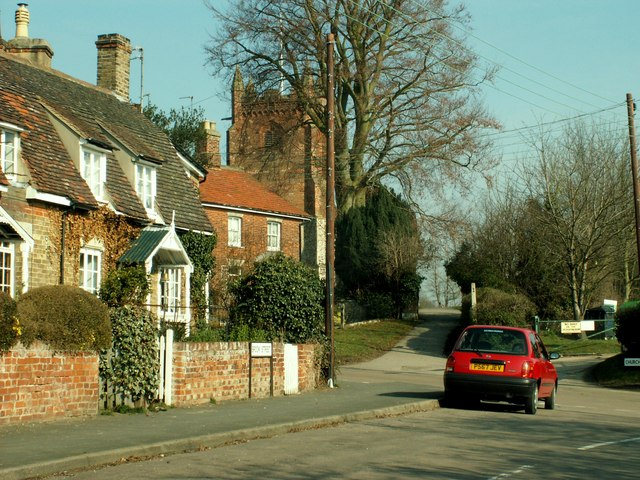

- Location within Essex
- Population: 998 (Parish, 2021)
- OS grid reference: TL855305
- District: Braintree
- Shire county: Essex
- Region: East
- Country: England
- Sovereign state: United Kingdom
- Post town: Colchester
- Postcode district: CO6
- Dialling code: 01787
- Police: Essex
- Fire: Essex
- Ambulance: East of England
- UK Parliament: Braintree

Colne Engaine is a village and civil parish in Essex, England, situated just north of the River Colne and of the larger village of Earls Colne, approximately ten miles northwest of Colchester. The village takes its name from the river, around which it is likely that the earliest settlements were made, and the Engaine family, who were the principal family of the village between 1279 and 1367. At the 2021 census the parish had a population of 998.

== History ==
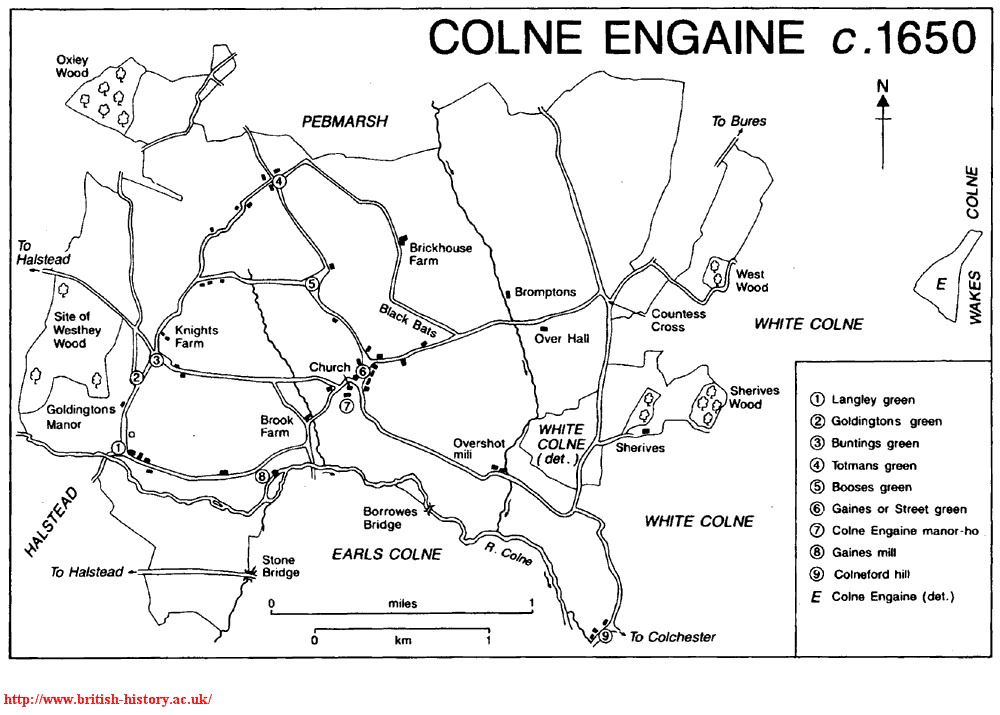
Colne Engaine c.1650

Variations in spelling may be Colne Gagn and Colne Geyne, as seen in 1418.

Previously the village had been known as Little Colne, and is recorded in the Domesday Book of 1086 as Parva Colun with 38 inhabitants, returning '[a] Man-at-arms from Walter the Deacon; Walter from Robert Malet. 2 mills, 3 beehives. 13 goats'. It is one of four villages named after the river (the others being Earls Colne, Wakes Colne, and White Colne). The parish contains the hamlet of Countess Cross. Evidence of Roman settlements have been found by the Church, and also at Knight's Farm, to the west of the village. The Sheriff's manor of Colne Engaine was purchased by John de Vere, 13th Earl of Oxford in 1508, in order to augment his adjacent Earls Colne manor.

== The Village Pub ==
The Five Bells is the only public house in Colne Engaine. The building is over 500 years old and a record of landlords since 1579 is displayed in the bar area. In 1689 the landlord was recorded as running a 'disorderly house'. Another public house, the Three Cups was recorded in 1766.

== St Andrew Church ==
This church is situated towards the centre of the village. The nave was built in the Norman period with the lower part of the current tower added in the fourteenth century. It has a red brick tower. It was restored in 1872-3 under the direction of the architect E. Swansborough. Restoration of the church tower was funded by Katherine Courtauld, a local farmer and landowner. The church is adorned with several twentieth-century stained glass windows, including ones by Arthur Erridge, Alan Younger, and Reginald Bell. The windows include one from 1935 by Reginald Bell showing a sower and a reaping angel in memory of Katherine Courtauld, installed as a memorial by her life-long partner Mary Gladstone.

== Courtauld Memorial Hall ==
This is the village hall. Run by a local charity, it provides facilities for the community to meet for social, educational, and fitness activities. Its construction around 1920 was funded by Katherine Courtauld in memory of her father, George Courtauld.

== Colne Engaine Football Club ==
Colne Engaine FC, nicknamed 'The Engines', was founded in 1921.

In 2003, the club folded due to a lack of interest, however, with the help of the parish council and former club members, the club was reformed in 2005; repairing the changing rooms and moving to the local community pitch, Burches Meadow.

== Colne Engaine Primary School ==
There is a Voluntary aided primary school.

== Notable former residents ==
- Isaac Baker Brown, a controversial 19th-century gynaecologist and surgeon, was born in the village. The white-brick facade of Knight's Farm, still extant today, is his work.
- Katherine Courtauld (1856 - 1935), a member of the Courtauld family, farmed at Knight's Farm from 1877 until her death in 1935, and was a major landowner in the area.
- Steve Lamacq, a BBC Radio 1 DJ and Fighting Talk pundit was raised in Colne Engaine; his parents still live in the village.
