= Louisa Wilkins =

English writer and agricultural administrator

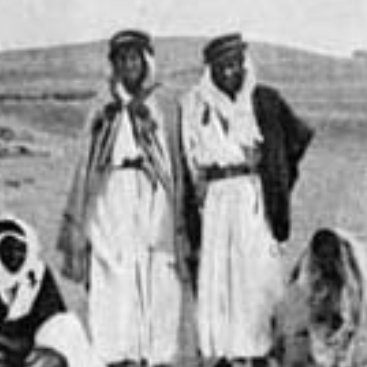
- Two figures from Louisa Wilkins' book
- Born: Louisa Jebb; 8 August 1873; Ellesmere, England
- Died: 1929 (aged 55–56)
- Other name: Mrs Roland Wilkins
- Education: Newnham College, Cambridge
- Occupations: Writer and agricultural organiser
- Known for: Established the forerunner of the Women's Land Army during World War One
- Parent(s): Eglantyne Louisa Jebb and Arthur Trevor Jebb
- Relatives: Eglantyne and Dorothy (became Buxton) (sisters); Richard (brother); Richard Claverhouse Jebb (uncle)

Louisa Wilkins OBE, also known as Mrs Roland Wilkins (born Louisa Jebb; 8 August 1873 – 1929) was a British writer and agricultural administrator. She was involved in the creation and recruitment for the Women's Land Army during World War One. She was an enthusiast for small holdings and after the war she inspired the creation of a small holding co-operative for women who had entered agriculture during the war.

== Life ==
Wilkins was born in Ellesmere in 1873. Her parents were Eglantyne Louisa Jebb (née Jebb) and Arthur Trevor Jebb, who were cousins. Her sisters Eglantyne and Dorothy (became Buxton) co-founded the children's international development agency Save the Children. Her brother Richard Jebb was a journalist and she was the niece of the classical scholar and politician Sir Richard Claverhouse Jebb.

Wilkins attended Newnham College in Cambridge. She had studied agriculture and she worked as a bailiff at her brother's farm.

She was a founder member of the Women's Farm and Garden Union, which was formed in 1899. For three years up to 1907, she was retained by the Cooperative Small Holdings Association. In 1907, she published The Small Holdings of England, which was an attempt to provide a survey of the small holdings of England. She describes the history of small holdings, the philanthropic acts that created them, current experiments and she tells her readers how to establish more.

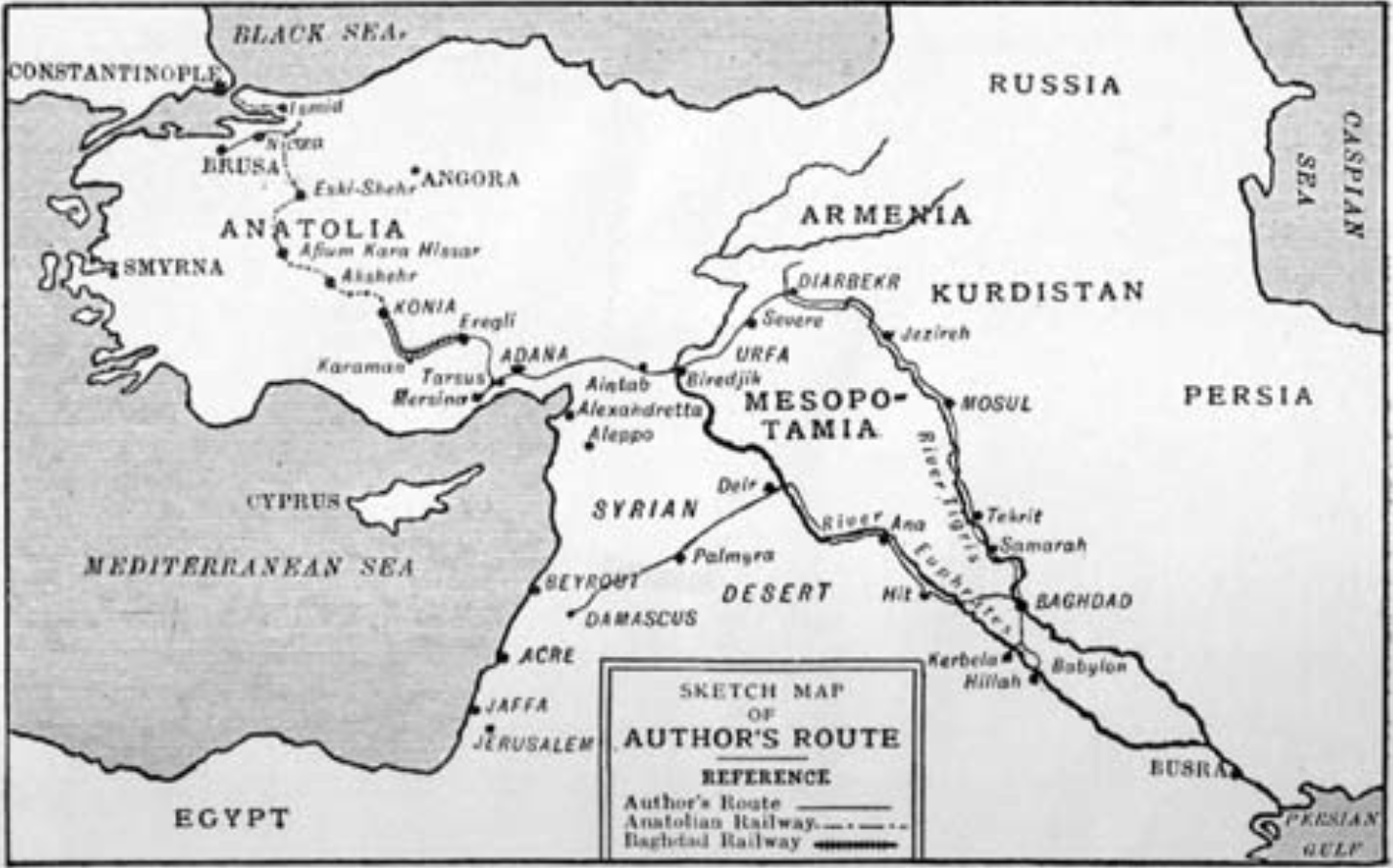
Louisa Wilkins route to Baghdad in 1908

In 1908, she and a female friend, Victoria Buxton (known as Victoria de Bunsen after her marriage), who Wilkins named as "X" in her book, decided to set out on an adventure. They first decided on the continent and that they "should choose a country which could be reached otherwise than by sea; and that, having reached it, its nature should be such that we could travel indefinitely in it without reaching the sea". Using a pencil on the map they decided that their destination should be Damascus and they would "fill in the details when we get there".

They decided to travel across the Ottoman Empire to Baghdad and Damascus. Neither of them could speak the local languages, they were unaware of customs, they wore long skirts and rode side saddle; Wilkins would later publish an account of their journey and the sights they saw.

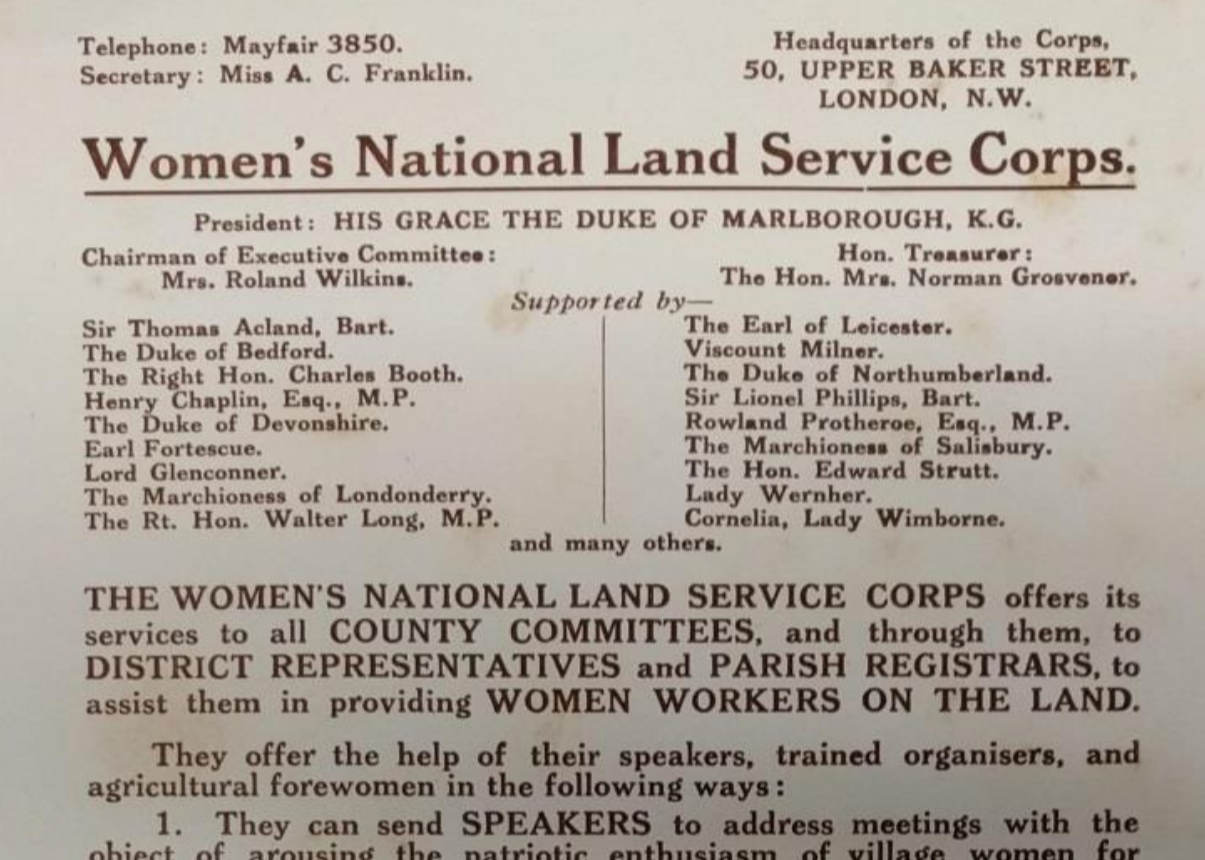
Extract from a Women's National Land Service Corps pamphlet

In February 1916, the Women's Farm and Garden Union sent a deputation to meet Lord Selborne, to establish a group in response to the war effort. Selborne's Ministry of Agriculture agreed to fund a Women's National Land Service Corps with a grant of £150 and Wilkins was to lead the new voluntary organisation that was to focus on recruiting women for emergency agricultural war work. She chaired the executive committee, offices were established in Upper Baker Street and the 9th Duke of Marlborough agreed to be president.

The new organisation was tasked with improving recruitment and providing propaganda about the benefits of women of all classes undertaking agricultural work. The new members of her organisation were not to become agricultural workers but to organise others (e.g. in villages) to do this work. By the end of 1916, they had recruited 2,000 volunteers, but they estimated that 40,000 were required.

At the Women's National Land Service Corps's suggestion, a Land Army was formed. The WNLSC continued to deal with recruitment and the network assisted in the launch of a "Land Army", and by April 1917 they had more than 500 replies and 88 joined the new Land Army where they became group leaders and supervisors.

The Women's Land Army would grow to 23,000 women earning about a pound a week. This was a sizeable contribution but it is estimated that the number of women working on the land during the war was 300,000.

== After the war ==
Wilkins retained her interest in farming, smallholding and the women who had entered agriculture during the war. With the backing of the Women's Farm and Garden Union, she and Katherine Courtauld established a set of small holdings in 1920 on Wire Mill Lane in Lingfield in Surrey.

She died in 1929 and Courtauld died in 1935. With the loss of these two leaders, the small holding initiative was wound up after it lost impetus during the 1930s.

== Works include ==
- The Small Holdings of England; A survey of various existing systems, 1907
- By Desert Ways to Baghdad, by Louisa Jebb (Mrs Roland Wilkins), 1908
- The Small Holdings Controversy: Tenancy v. Ownership, 1910
