= Robert Grosvenor, 1st Baron Ebury =

British courtier and Whig politician (1801–1893)

The Right Honourable The Lord Ebury PC
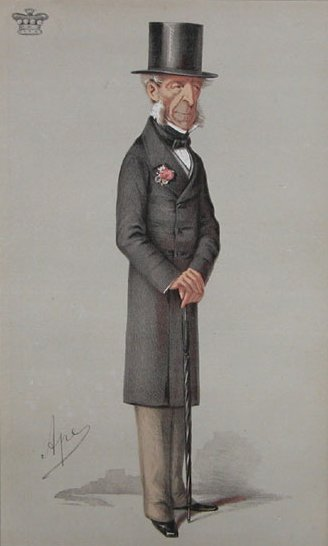
- Lord Ebury caricatured by 'Ape' in Vanity Fair in 1871.

Comptroller of the Household
- In office 23 November 1830 – 9 July 1834
- Monarch: William IV
- Prime Minister: The Earl Grey; The Viscount Melbourne
- Preceded by: Lord George Beresford
- Succeeded by: Henry Lowry-Corry

Treasurer of the Household
- In office 3 August 1846 – 23 July 1847
- Monarch: Victoria
- Prime Minister: Lord John Russell
- Preceded by: Earl Jermyn
- Succeeded by: Lord Marcus Hill

Personal details
- Born: 24 April 1801
- Died: 18 November 1893 (aged 92)
- Party: Whig
- Spouse(s): Hon. Charlotte; Wellesley (d. 1891)
- Education: Westminster School
- Alma mater: Christ Church, Oxford

Robert Grosvenor, 1st Baron Ebury PC (24 April 1801 – 18 November 1893), styled Lord Robert Grosvenor from 1831 to 1857, was a British courtier and Whig politician. He served as Comptroller of the Household between 1830 and 1834 and as Treasurer of the Household between 1846 and 1847. In 1857 he was ennobled as Baron Ebury.

== Background and education ==
Grosvenor was the third son of Robert Grosvenor, 1st Marquess of Westminster, and his wife Eleanora, daughter of Thomas Egerton, 1st Earl of Wilton. He was the younger brother of Richard Grosvenor, 2nd Marquess of Westminster, and of Thomas Egerton, 2nd Earl of Wilton, while Hugh Lupus Grosvenor, 1st Duke of Westminster, and Richard Grosvenor, 1st Baron Stalbridge, were his nephews.

He was educated at Westminster School and Christ Church, Oxford.

== Political career ==
In 1821 Grosvenor was returned to Parliament for Shaftesbury, a seat he held until 1826, and then sat for Chester until 1847. When the Whigs came to power in November 1830 under Lord Grey, Grosvenor was appointed Comptroller of the Household and admitted to the Privy Council. He retained this office also when Lord Melbourne became Prime Minister in July 1834. The Whig government fell in November the same year. Grosvenor did not serve in Melbourne's second administration which lasted from 1835 to 1841. However, when the Whigs returned to office in 1846 under Lord John Russell he was made Treasurer of the Household, which he remained until his resignation in July 1847. In the latter year Grosvenor was returned to Parliament for Middlesex, a seat he held until 1857. However, he never returned to office. In September 1857 he was raised to the peerage as Baron Ebury, of Ebury Manor in the County of Middlesex.

== Interests ==
Apart from his political career, Lord Ebury was an active campaigner for Protestantism in the Church of England and was the founder and President of the society for the "revision of the prayer-book". He was also involved in the movement led by Anthony Ashley Cooper, 7th Earl of Shaftesbury, for the improvement of factory working hours. In later life he came to oppose William Ewart Gladstone on the issue of Irish Home Rule. In September 1893, at the age of 92, Lord Ebury voted against the Second Home Rule Bill, by far the oldest peer to vote in the matter.

Lord Ebury was also a fervent supporter of homeopathy, the medical doctrine introduced by the German physician Samuel Hahnemann. He was a patron of both Dr. Curie's short-lived Homoeopathic Hospital in Bloomsbury Square and Dr Quin's London Homoeopathic Hospital. Lord Ebury served as chairman and president of the London Homoeopathic Hospital from its foundation in 1849, and during that time even defended the doctrine and the institution against its opponents in Parliament.

In 1860, Lord Ebury led a business venture with the Great Western Railway to build a 13-kilometre (8.1 mi) railway from Watford, near his mansion at Moor Park, to Uxbridge in Buckinghamshire. The scheme failed and the line, the Watford and Rickmansworth Railway, only reached as far as Rickmansworth, 7.2 kilometres (4.5 mi) south of Watford. The railway never operated at a profit and eventually closed in 1952, but has since been converted into a cycle path which bears his name, the Ebury Way.

== Personal life ==
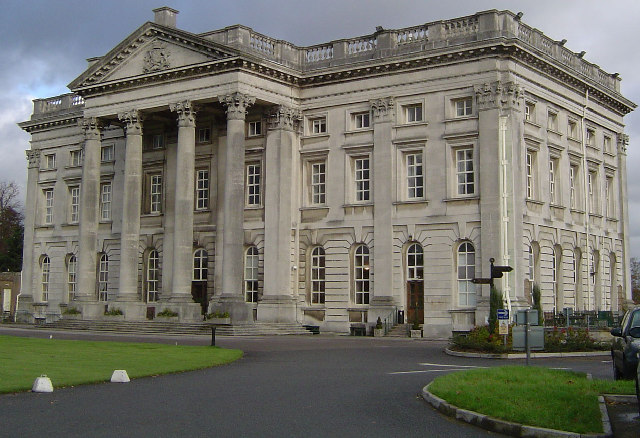
Lord Ebury's mansion at Moor Park

On 17 May 1831, Lord Ebury was married to the Hon. Charlotte Arbuthnot Wellesley, eldest daughter of the diplomat Henry Wellesley, 1st Baron Cowley (younger brother of Arthur Wellesley, 1st Duke of Wellington). They had a London home at 29 Upper Grosvenor Street, Mayfair. Together, they had five sons and two daughters including:

- Robert Wellesley Grosvenor, 2nd Baron Ebury (1834–1918), who married Hon. Emilie White, the second daughter of Henry White, 1st Baron Annaly.
- Hon. Thomas George Grosvenor (1842–1886), who married Sophia Williams, daughter of the American missionary and sinologist Samuel Wells Williams.
- Hon. Norman de l'Aigle Grosvenor (1845–1898), who represented Chester in Parliament; he married Caroline Stuart-Wortley, fourth daughter of James Stuart-Wortley (third son of James Stuart-Wortley-Mackenzie, 1st Baron Wharncliffe) and Hon. Jane Lawley, in 1881.
- Hon. Algernon Henry Grosvenor (1864–1907), who married Catherine Dorothea Mary Simeon, eldest daughter of Sir John Simeon, 3rd Baronet and, his second wife, the former Hon. Catherine Dorothea Colville (sister of Charles Colville, 1st Viscount Colville and daughter of Gen. Hon. Sir Charles Colville), in 1887.
- Hon. Richard Cecil Grosvenor (1848-1919), a barrister who married Jessie Amelia Clarke, a daughter of the Rev. Charles Clarke, in 1898.

Lord Ebury died in November 1893, aged 92, and was succeeded in the barony by his eldest son Robert.

== Arms ==
Coat of arms of Robert Grosvenor, 1st Baron Ebury
Coronet A coronet of an Baron Crest A talbot statant or. Escutcheon Azure, a garb or; a mullet for difference. Supporters Two talbots reguardant or, collared azure and charged on the shoulder with a mullet of the second. Motto Virtus non stemma. (Virtue, not ancestry)

Parliament of the United Kingdom
Preceded by Ralph Leycester; Abraham Moore	Member of Parliament for Shaftesbury; 1822–1826; With: Ralph Leycester	Succeeded by Ralph Leycester; Edward Davies Davenport
Preceded by Thomas Grosvenor; Viscount Belgrave	Member of Parliament for Chester; 1826–1847; With: Viscount Belgrave 1826–1830; Sir Philip Grey Egerton, Bt 1830–1831; Foster Cunliffe-Offley 1831–1832; John Finchett Maddock 1832; Sir John Jervis 1832–1847	Succeeded by Sir John Jervis; Earl Grosvenor
Preceded by George Byng; Thomas Wood	Member of Parliament for Middlesex; 1847 – 1857; With: Thomas Wood 1847; Ralph Bernal Osborne 1847–1857; Robert Culling Hanbury 1857	Succeeded by Hon. George Byng; Robert Culling Hanbury
Political offices
Preceded by Lord George Beresford	Comptroller of the Household; 1830–1834	Succeeded by Henry Lowry-Corry
Preceded by Earl Jermyn	Treasurer of the Household; 1846–1847	Succeeded by Lord Marcus Hill
Court offices
Preceded by None	Groom of the Stole to Prince Albert; 1840–1841	Succeeded by The Marquess of Exeter
Honorary titles
Preceded by The Marquess of Donegall	Senior Privy Counsellor; 1883–1893	Succeeded by The Earl Grey
Peerage of the United Kingdom
New creation	Baron Ebury; 1857–1893	Succeeded by Robert Wellesley Grosvenor
