= 1869 Chester by-election =

UK parliamentary by-election

The 1869 Chester by-election was contested on 4 December 1869 due to the incumbent Liberal MP, Hugh Grosvenor, succeeding to the peerage as Marquess of Westminster. It was retained by the Liberal candidate Norman de L'Aigle Grosvenor, who was unopposed.
