= High Garrett =

Hamlet in Essex, England

Coordinates: 51.912°N 0.579°E

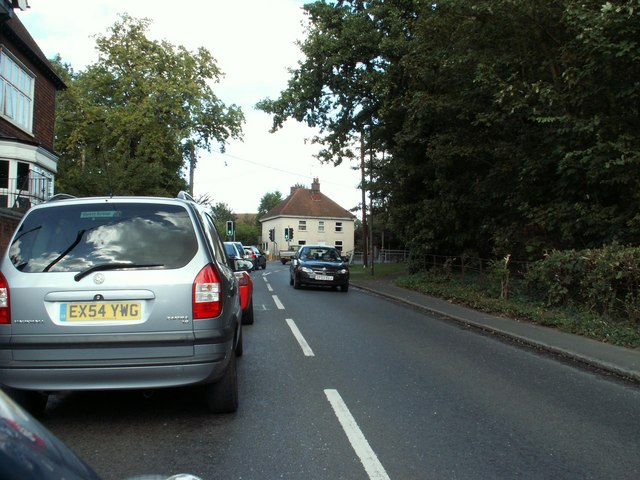

- Location within Essex
- Area: 0.417 km^{2} (0.161 sq mi)
- Population: 814 (2018 estimate)
  - Density: 1,952/km^{2} (5,060/sq mi)
- District: Braintree
- Shire county: Essex
- Region: East
- Country: England
- Sovereign state: United Kingdom

High Garrett is a hamlet on the A131 road near the town of Braintree, Essex, England. In 2018 the settlement had an estimated population of 814.
