= Working For Gardeners Association =

Association to improve employment of women in gardening

- Formation: 1899; 127 years ago
- Registration no.: 212527
- Legal status: registered charity
- Fields: horticulture, education
- Chair: Vanessa Easlea
- Website: https://www.wfga.org.uk/

The forerunner of the Working For Gardeners Association was created in 1899. It has had various names including the Women's Farm and Garden Society (WFGS) and the Women's Farm and Garden Union (WFGU). Its original objective was to improve the employment opportunities for women working on the land. During the First World War, it created the Women's National Land Service Corps (WNLSC) in 1916 and recruited 2,000 volunteers. At the WNLSC's suggestion, the government created the Women's Land Army. In 1920, the WFGU was concerned that after the war, women were not being offered the help that men were. It created a cooperative set of small holdings for women in Surrey. During the Second World War, it organised training. The charity organised training courses for both women and men in 2020 under its new working name of the Working For Gardeners Association.

== History ==
What would become Women's Farm and Garden Union/Society (WFGU) was established in 1899. It was created by women who had attended the International Congress of Women in London in June 1899. The new organisation had 22 members and was called The Women's Agricultural and Horticultural International Union. It became the Women's Farm and Garden Union in 1910. Its objective was to improved the employment opportunities for women working on the land. Its founding members included Louisa Jepp (later Mrs Wilkins). The union represented the professional interests of women working on the land.

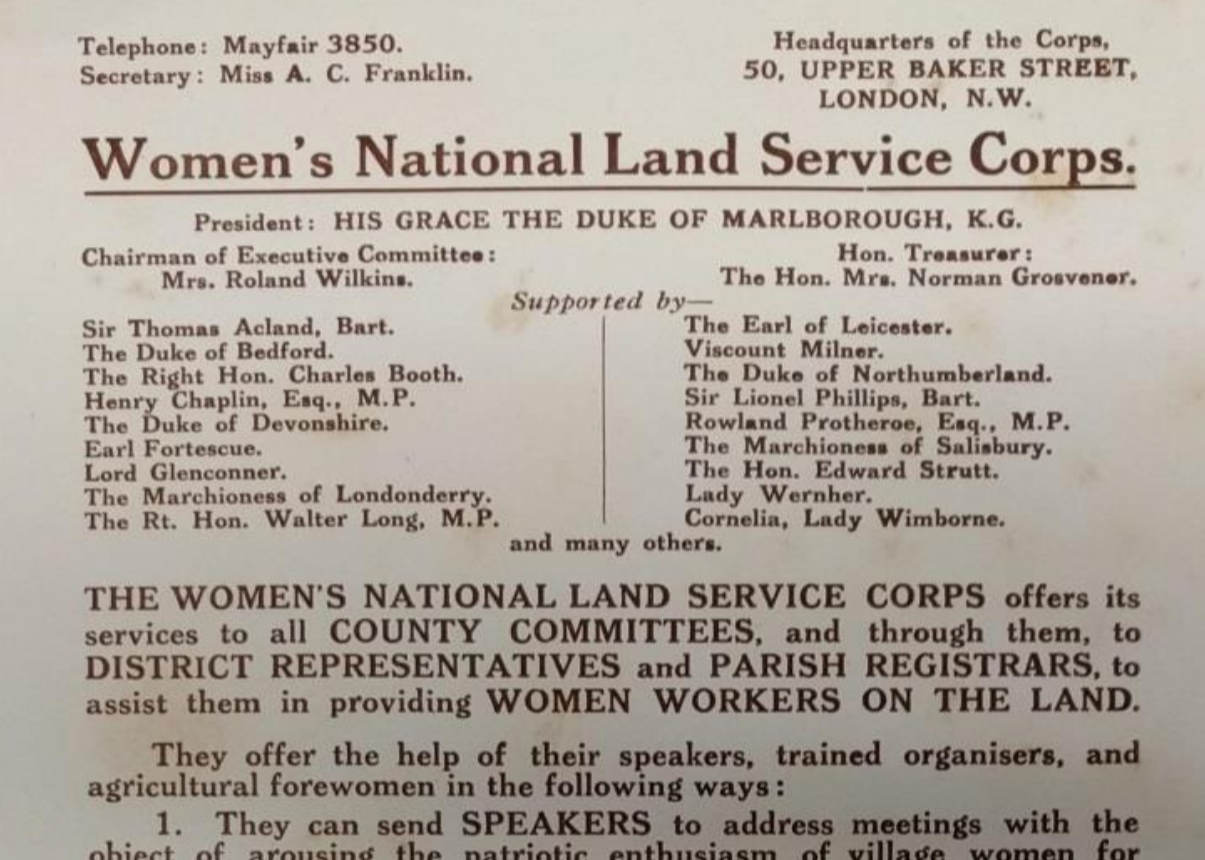
Extract from a Women's National Land Service Corps pamphlet

During the First World War, the organisation had offices in Westminster. It had about 500 members, who were mainly women who owned and worked their land.

In February 1916, the Women's Farm and Garden Union sent a deputation to meet Lord Selborne to establish a group in response to the war effort. Selborne's Ministry of Agriculture agreed to fund a Women's National Land Service Corps with a grant of £150 and Wilkins was to lead the new voluntary organisation that was to focus on recruiting women for emergency agricultural war work. She chaired the executive committee, offices were established in Upper Baker Street, and the 9th Duke of Marlborough agreed to be President. In May 1916, they held a meeting at Chelsea Hospital to talk about women working on the land. Louisa Wilkins was quoted in The Times asking women if they were doing the right type of war work or were they just "putting sugar in the cups of tea for tommies".

The new organisation was tasked with improving recruitment and providing propaganda about the benefits of women of all classes undertaking agricultural work. The new members were not to become agricultural workers but to organise others (eg in villages) to do this work. By the end of 1916, the group had recruited 2,000 volunteers, but they estimated that 40,000 were required.

At the Women's National Land Service Corps's suggestion, a Land Army was formed. The WNLSC continued to deal with recruitment and the network assisted in the launch of a "Land Army". By April 1917, they had over 500 replies and 88 joined the new Land Army where they became group leaders and supervisors.

The Women's Land Army grew to 23,000 women, with each recruit earning up to a pound a week. This was a sizeable contribution to the war effort, but it is estimated that the number of women working on the land during the war was 300,000. As the war ended, the organisation considered its options. One idea was to ready women for emigration, but the chair Mrs Norman Grovesnor minuted that they would embark on a scheme of establishing small holdings.

== After the war ==
With the backing of the Women's Farm and Garden Union, Louisa Wilkins and Katherine Courtauld established a set of small holdings in 1920 on Wire Mill Lane in Lingfield, Surrey. Surrey County Council purchased more than 2,000 acres (810 ha) of land and created small holdings for more than 250 service people empowered by the Land Settlement (Facilities) Act 1919. None of the council's tenants were women. It was the small holdings in Wire Mill Lane that provided small holdings for women in Surrey. The tenants were expected to have an income of £25 per annum in addition to capital, as the small holdings were not considered large enough to support their owner. The initial funders included the suffragette Margaret Ashton who found £5,000 and Sydney Renee Courtauld who lent them £4,000. The following year the WFGU became the Women's Farm and Garden Association.

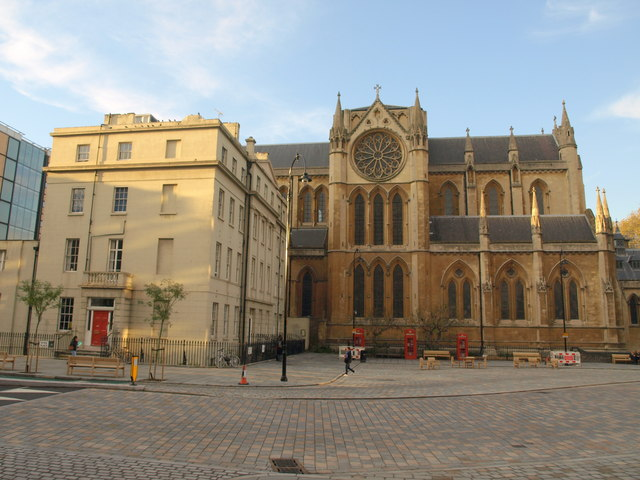
Their 1931 gifted HQ was Courtauld House (shown to the left of the Church of Christ the King in Bloomsbury)

Wilkins died in 1929 and the organisation was incorporated. Two years later, Katherine Courtauld gifted to the association the prestigious Courtauld House in Bloomsbury. At the new location, members were able to use a clubhouse which was created for their use. Courtauld died in 1935 and with the loss of its two leading lights, the small holding initiative was wound up after it lost impetus during the 1930s.

During the Second World War, the WFGU was involved with establishing practical courses for women who wanted to work in agriculture, and a garden skills course for school leavers was created.

In 1961, the organisation sold Courtauld House to the Quakers and rented back office space. In 1978, they moved to Colchester, where they were based at Lilac Cottage until moving again in 1983 to Cirencester.

In 2020, the Association adopted the working name "Working for Gardeners Association".
