= Alastair Francis Buchan =

British writer on defence studies (1918–1976)

Alastair Francis Buchan, CBE (9 September 1918 – 4 February 1976) was a leading British writer on defence studies in the 1970s.

== Career ==
The son of John Buchan, 1st Baron Tweedsmuir and Susan Charlotte Grosvenor, he was educated at Eton College and at Christ Church, Oxford. Buchan joined the Canadian Army and saw active service in the Second World War.

Having worked as a journalist with The Observer, Buchan was appointed Director of the International Institute for Strategic Studies in 1958, Commandant of the Imperial Defence College in 1969, and Montague Burton Professor of International Relations at the University of Oxford in 1972. In 1973 he gave the Reith Lectures on the theme "Change Without War".

== Family ==
In 1942 Buchan married Hope Gilmore; they had two sons and a daughter.

Military offices
Preceded by Sir Donald Evans	Commandant of the Imperial Defence College; 1970–1972	Succeeded by Sir Mervyn Butler
