= Richard Claverhouse Jebb =

British classical scholar and politician (1841–1905)

Sir Richard Claverhouse Jebb OM FBA FRSE
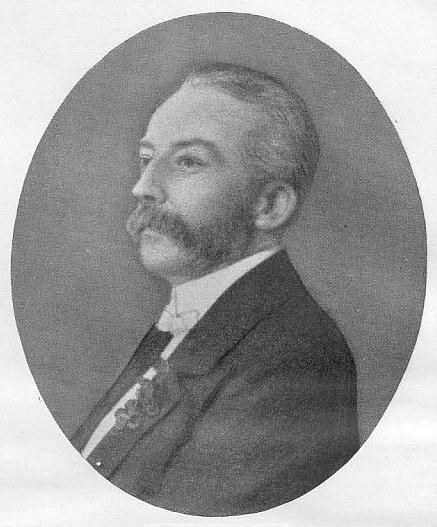

Member of Parliament for Cambridge University
- In office 1891–1905 Serving with: George Stokes to 1892; John Eldon Gorst from 1892
- Preceded by: Henry Cecil Raikes; George Stokes
- Succeeded by: Samuel Henry Butcher; John Frederick Peel Rawlinson

Personal details
- Born: 27 August 1841 Dundee, Scotland
- Died: 9 December 1905 (aged 64) Springfield House, Cambridge, England
- Resting place: St Giles Cemetery, Cambridge, England
- Party: Conservative
- Relatives: Robert Jebb (father) Emily Harriet Horsley (mother) Eglantyne Louisa Jebb (sister)

Sir Richard Claverhouse Jebb OM FBA FRSE (27 August 1841 – 9 December 1905) was a British classical scholar and MP for Cambridge.

== Life ==
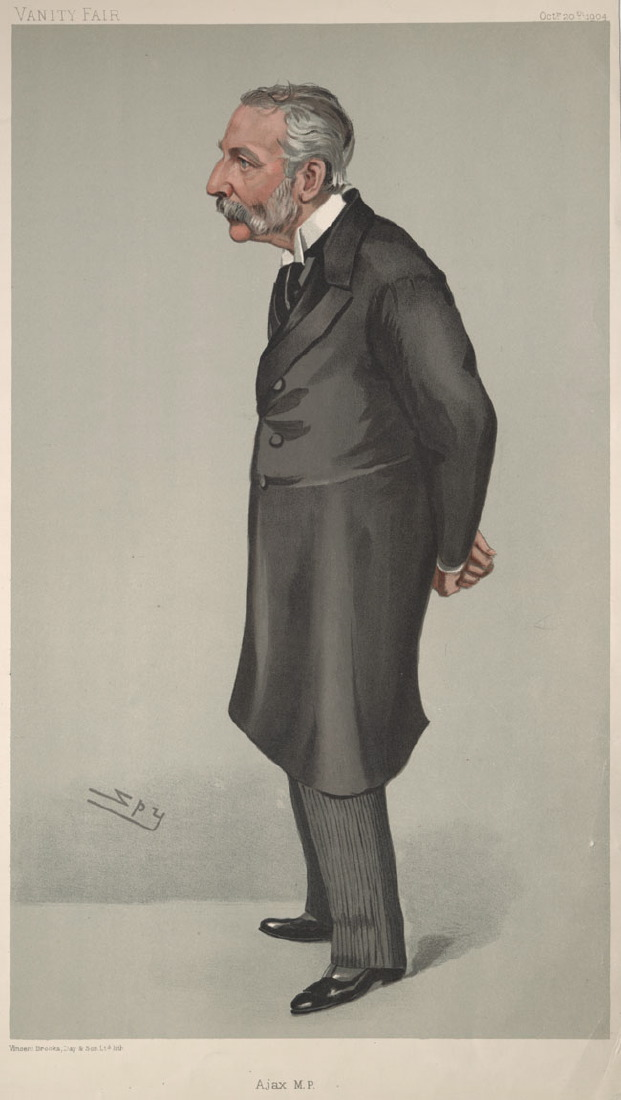
"Ajax MP". Caricature by Spy published in Vanity Fair in 1904.

Jebb was born in Dundee, Scotland, to Robert, a well-known Irish barrister, and Emily Harriet Horsley, daughter of the Reverend Heneage Horsley, Dean of Brechin. His grandfather Richard Jebb had been a judge of the Court of King's Bench (Ireland). His sister was the social reformer Eglantyne Louisa Jebb, founder of the Home Arts and Industries Association.

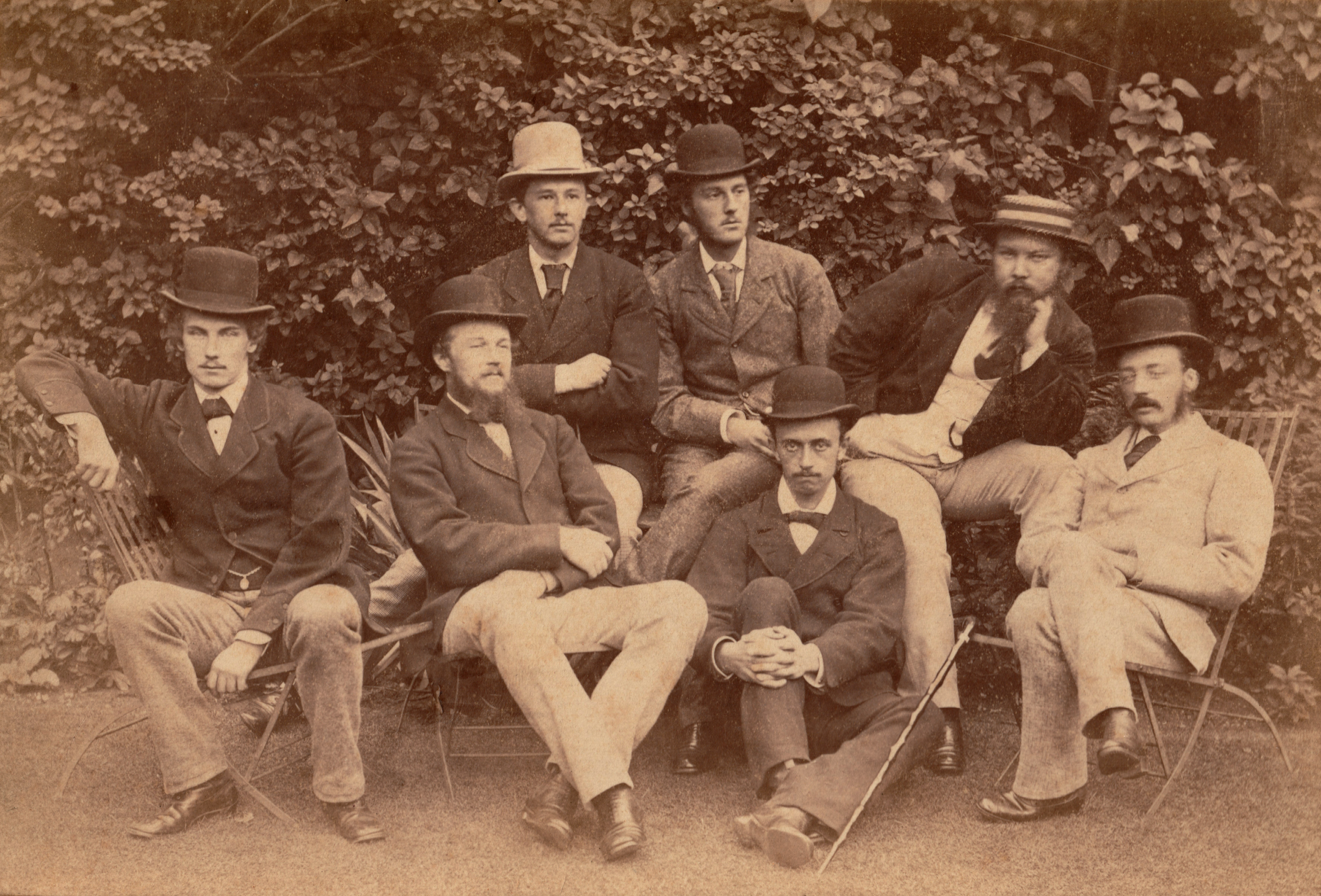
Jebb in 1873 (far right), Shakespeare Society, Trinity College, Cambridge

Jebb was educated at St Columba's College, Dublin 1853–55 and at Charterhouse School 1855–1858. He then studied Classics at Trinity College, Cambridge where he became a member of the Cambridge Apostles, an intellectual society, from 1859.

Jebb won the Porson and Craven scholarships, was senior classic in 1862, and became fellow and tutor of his college in 1863. From 1869 to 1875, he was public orator of Cambridge University.

On 18 August 1874, Jebb married Caroline Lane Reynolds, born in 1840 in Evansburg, Pennsylvania, whose first husband had been US Army Lieutenant Adam J. Slemmer. After his death in 1868, Caroline lived briefly in Cambridge.

From 1875 to 1889 Jebb was Professor of Greek at Glasgow, and the couple initially lived in that city, spending their summers in Cambridge. In 1889 Jebb was appointed Regius Professor of Greek at Cambridge, following the death of the incumbent, Benjamin Hall Kennedy, and the couple moved permanently to Cambridge.

In 1891 Jebb was elected Member of Parliament for Cambridge University, he was knighted in 1900, and he was elected a Fellow of the British Academy in 1902. He received many honorary degrees from European and American universities, and in May 1902 at Caernarfon received the honorary degree of DLitt from the University of Wales during the ceremony to install the Prince of Wales (later King George V) as Chancellor of that university. In 1904, he was elected a member to the American Philosophical Society. In 1905, he was made a member of the Order of Merit.

Jebb died at his home, Springfield House in Cambridge, on 9 December 1905 and was buried at the St Giles Cemetery (now known as the Parish of the Ascension Burial Ground) in the town. Caroline Jebb died and was cremated in America, her ashes being returned to Cambridge for interment in her husband's grave.

== Works ==
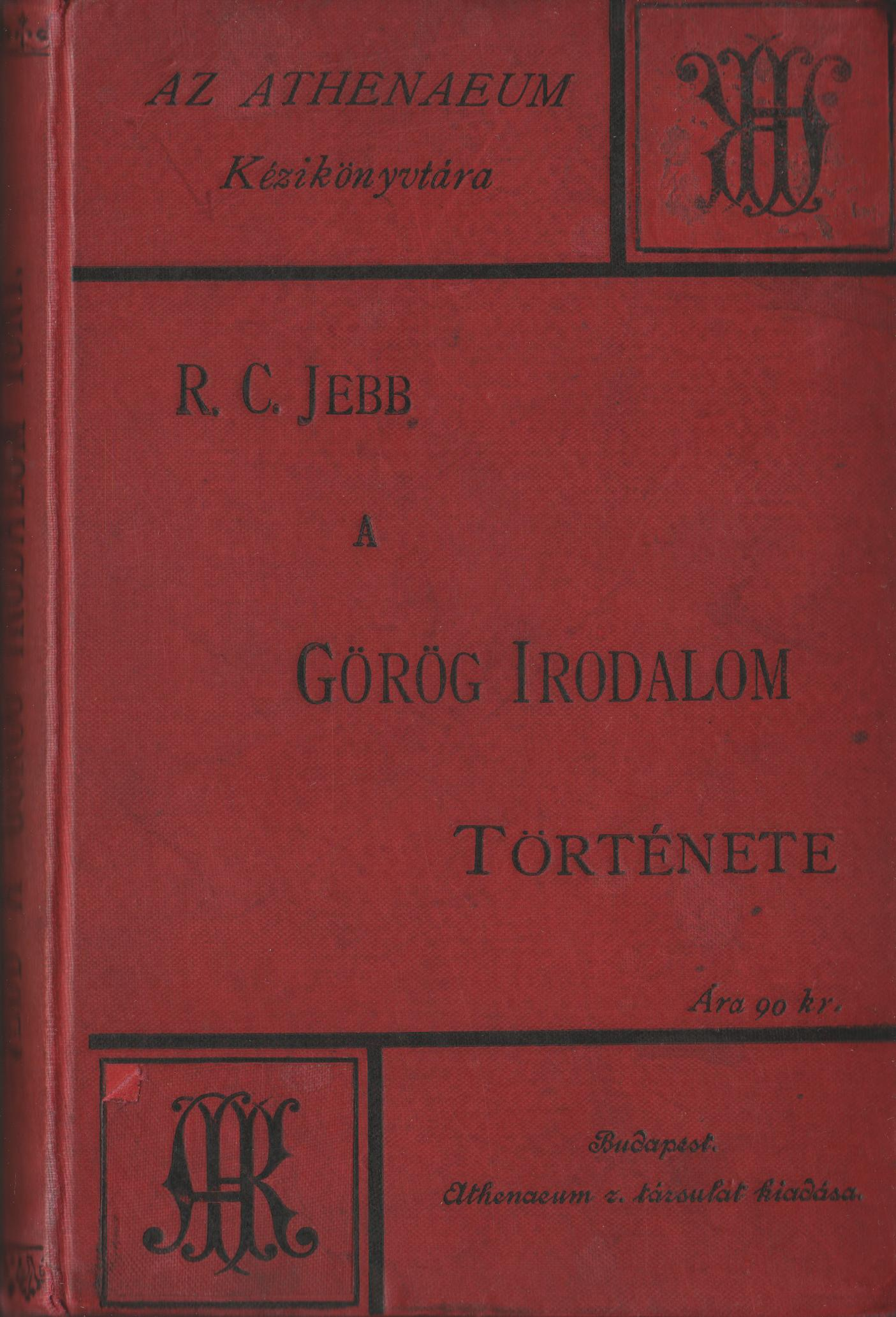
History of Greek literature (Hungarian edition, Budapest, 1894)

Jebb was a highly accomplished classical scholar, a humanist, and a notable translator from and into the classical languages. His translations of Sophocles are still read. For a balanced assessment of Jebb as scholar and translator, see David D. Dawes' Rutgers-New Brunswick article, 'Jebb, Richard Claverhouse'. Jebb's publications include:

- The Characters of Theophrastus (1870), text, introduction, English translation and commentary (re-edited by JE Sandys, 1909)
- ''Translations into Greek and Latin, appeared in 1873 (ed. 1909)
- The Attic Orators from Antiphon to Isaeus (2nd ed., 1893), with companion volume, Selections from the Attic Orators (2nd ed, 1888)
- Bentley (1882)
- Sophocles (3rd ed., 1893) the seven plays, text, English translation and notes, the promised edition of the fragments being prevented by his death
- Bacchylides (1905), text, translation, and notes
- Homer (3rd ed., 1888), an introduction to the Iliad and Odyssey
- Modern Greece (1901)
- The Growth and Influence of Classical Greek Poetry (1893).

His translation of the Rhetoric of Aristotle was published posthumously under the editorship of J. E. Sandys (1909). A selection from his Essays and Addresses, and a subsequent volume, Life and Letters of Sir Richard Claverhouse Jebb (with critical introduction by A. W. Verrall) were published by his widow in 1907; see also an appreciative notice by J. E. Sandys, History of Classical Scholarship, iii. (1908).

The Archives and Special Collections at Amherst College holds a collection of Jebb's papers.

== Notes ==
Parliament of the United Kingdom
Preceded by Henry Cecil Raikes; Sir George Stokes	Member of Parliament for Cambridge University; 1891–1906; With: Sir George Stokes to 1892; Sir John Eldon Gorst from 1892	Succeeded by Samuel Butcher; John Rawlinson
Academic offices
Preceded by Benjamin Hall Kennedy	Regius Professor of Greek Cambridge University; 1889–1905	Succeeded by Henry Jackson
