= Eglantyne Jebb =

English social reformer (1876–1928)

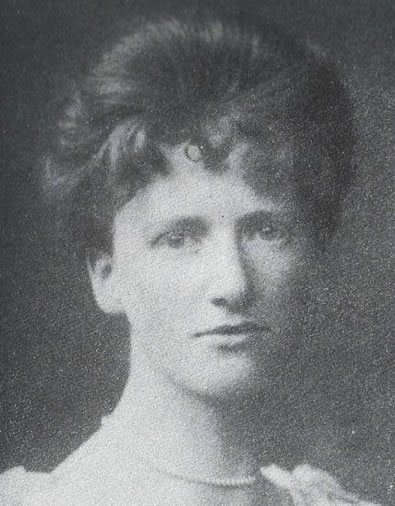
- Born: 25 August 1876; Ellesmere, Shropshire, England
- Died: 17 December 1928 (aged 52); Geneva, Switzerland
- Education: Lady Margaret Hall, Oxford
- Known for: Founder of Save the Children (1919), drafter of Declaration of the Rights of the Child (1924)
- Parent(s): Arthur Jebb and Eglantyne Louisa Jebb
- Relatives: Louisa Wilkins (sister); Dorothy Frances Jebb (sister)

Eglantyne Jebb (25 August 1876 – 17 December 1928) was an English social reformer. She founded the Save the Children organisation at the end of World War I to relieve the effects of famine in Austria-Hungary and Germany. She drafted the document that became the Declaration of the Rights of the Child.

== Early life and family ==
Eglantyne Jebb was born on 25 August 1876 in Ellesmere, Shropshire, to barrister Arthur Jebb and his wife and distant cousin, Eglantyne Louisa Jebb. She grew up at The Lyth, her family's nearby estate. The Jebbs were a wealthy family. Her mother had founded the Home Arts and Industries Association, to promote Arts and Crafts among young people in rural areas; her sister Louisa Wilkins would help found the Women's Land Army in World War I. Another sister, Dorothy, who married the Labour MP Charles Roden Buxton, campaigned against the demonisation of the German people after the war and served as a faculty member at Wellesley College, Massachusetts, United States, in 1929, teaching courses in English literature.

Eglantyne's paternal aunt, Louisa Jebb, was a Victorian "new woman" who introduced her and her five siblings to carpentry, fishing, and lead bullets casting. Louisa inspired her niece to go to university at a time when very few women did, having attended Newnham College, Cambridge, herself.

== Social activism, Cambridge 1900–1918 ==
From 1895 to 1898, Jebb read history at Lady Margaret Hall, Oxford, intending to become a school teacher. Jebb taught for a year at St. Peter's School, Marlborough (built in 1904, closed July 2017). This convinced Jebb that teaching was not her vocation.

Jebb moved to Cambridge in 1901 to look after her sick mother. There, encouraged by Mary Marshall and Florence Keynes, she became involved in the Charity Organisation Society, which aimed to bring a modern scientific approach to charity work. This led her to research urban conditions. In 1906, Jebb published Cambridge, a Study in Social Questions based on her research.

In the run-up to World War I, the Cambridge Independent Press, a weekly Liberal-supporting newspaper, covered Jebb's political campaign in Cambridge. In 1907, Jebb was appointed to the Education Committee of Cambridge Borough Council, although in her first year she attended only 13 of a possible 31 meetings. Jebb sat on the committee of the newly formed League for Physical Education and Improvement, but resigned citing pressures from other workloads.

Under the supervision of Florence Keynes, Jebb and Keynes' daughter, Margaret Hill, set up and ran the Boys' Employment Registry, shortly followed by a similar one for girls. In 2014, a blue plaque was mounted above 82 Regent Street where the employment registry had been sited.

In 1913, Jebb was influenced by Charles Roden Buxton to undertake a journey to Macedonia on behalf of the Macedonian Relief Fund. She returned shortly before the First World War broke out, and soon was drawn into a project organised by her sister Dorothy, who had begun importing European newspapers – including ones from Germany and Austria-Hungary for which a special license had to be obtained from the government – and publishing extracts in English in the Cambridge Magazine, which revealed that everyday life in the enemy countries was far worse than government propaganda suggested. These translated pleas for aid garnered the support of playwright George Bernard Shaw.

== Geneva 1918–1928 ==
Eglantyne spent her last ten years in Geneva. As the First World War was coming to an end and the German and Austro-Hungarian economies came near to collapse, it was clear to Dorothy and Eglantyne that the children of these countries were suffering appallingly from the effects of the war and the Allied blockade, which continued even when an armistice was signed

In 1919, the Fight the Famine Council was established to pressure the British government into ending the blockade. As its secretary, Eglantyne sent photographers and doctors to document civilian suffering in Central Europe, and in April 1919, she was arrested in Trafalgar Square for distributing leaflets with the resulting photographs of starving children. After being found guilty under the Defence of the Realm Act 1914, Eglantyne had her fines paid by the crown prosecutor, Archibald Bodkin.

=== Save the Children Fund ===
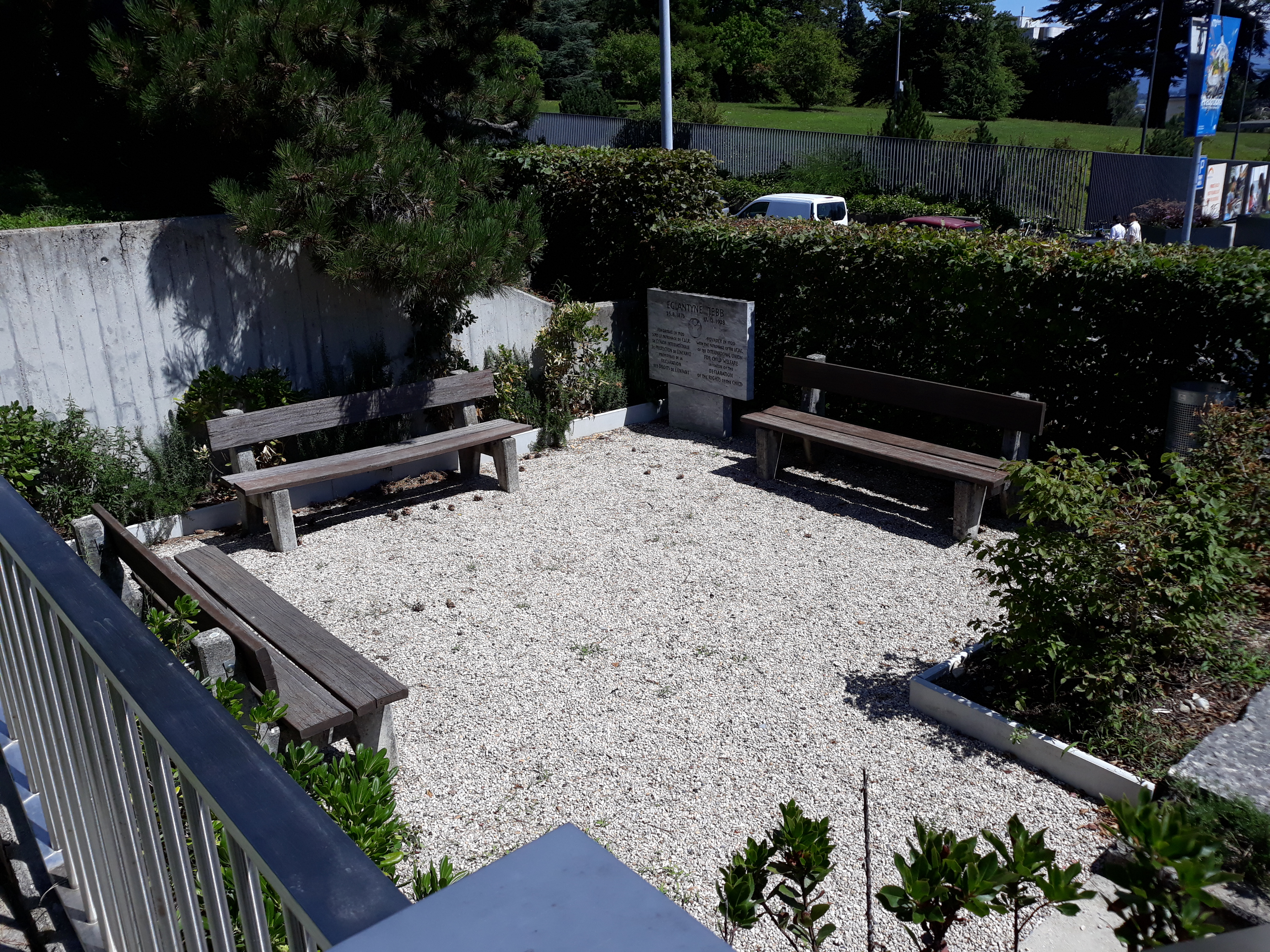
Memorial garden to Jebb on the ICRC site in Geneva.

Jebb's focus shifted to organising relief. On 15 April 1919, the Council set up a fund to raise money for the German and Austrian children – the Save the Children Fund. Unexpectedly, this organisation, launched at the Royal Albert Hall in London on 19 May 1919, quickly raised a large sum of money from the British public.

The success of the Fund led her and her sister Dorothy to attempt to set up an international movement for children. In 1920, the International Save the Children Union (Union Internationale de Secours à l'Enfant) was founded in Geneva, with the British Save the Children Fund and the Swedish Rädda Barnen as leading members.

In London, Jebb was in charge, and she ensured that the Fund adopted the professional approach she had learnt in the Charity Organisation Society. A manager, Lewis Golden, was recruited to put the organisation on a businesslike foundation. He adopted the innovative – and controversial – approach of taking full-page advertisements in national newspapers; it was highly effective, and raised very substantial amounts of income for the Fund's work.

As the problems in central Europe receded, a new focus of the Fund's attention became a refugee crisis in Greece and the surrounding areas, a consequence of the continuing conflict in the area. In 1921, just as this situation was coming under control, there was a new and bigger emergency, the Russian famine of 1921 affecting the people of Soviet Russia. A new fundraising effort brought a surge of donations, and Save the Children brought a shipment of 600 tons of food and medical supplies to Russia.

=== Declaration of the Rights of the Child, 1923/24 ===
In all the work the Fund did, a major element in Jebb's thinking was the importance of a planned, research-based approach. In 1923, when the Russian relief effort was coming to an end, and the Fund's income was sharply reducing, she turned to another issue, that of children's rights. Jebb headed to Geneva, to a meeting of the International Save the Children Union, with a plan for a Children's Charter. She drafted a short and clear document which asserted the rights of children and the duty of the international community to put children's rights at the forefront of planning. The Declaration of the Rights of the Child, or the Declaration of Geneva as it came to be known, was adopted in 1924 by the League of Nations.

With peace returning to Europe, and relief efforts in decline, the focus of the Save the Children movement shifted to promoting the Declaration. In 1925, the first International Child Welfare congress was held in Geneva. The Declaration was widely discussed and supported by organisations and governments.

== Personal life ==
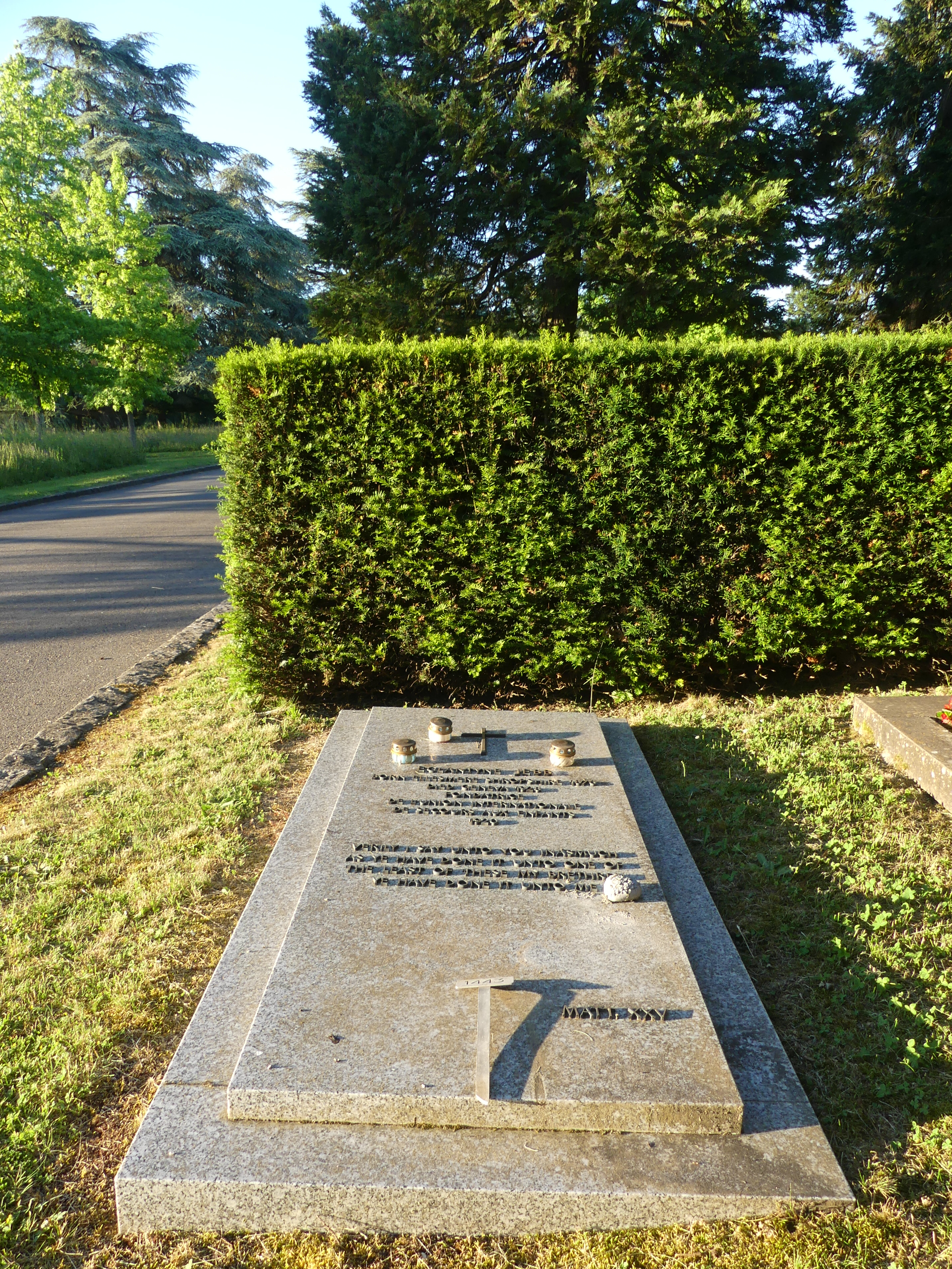
Jebb's original grave at the Cimetière de Saint Georges

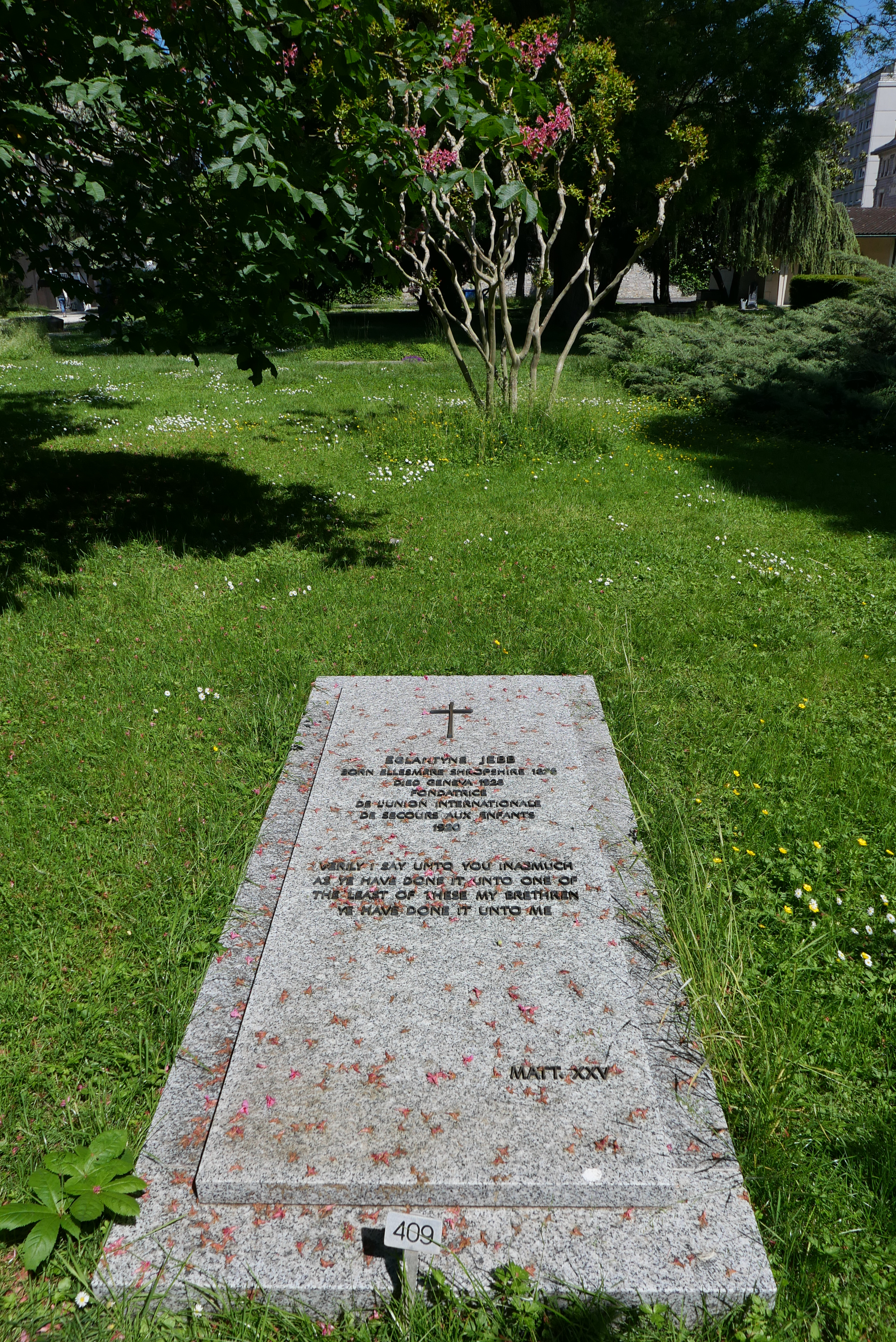
Jebb's final grave at the Cimetière des Rois.

Before World War I, Jebb had a lesbian relationship with Margaret Keynes (sister of Maynard Keynes). In their extensive correspondence, they shared their wish for a time when they could live together or even live as a married couple. The correspondence reveals a loving and intense relationship that ended with Margaret's marriage to Archibald Hill in 1913.

After many years of ill health due to a thyroid problem, including three operations for goitre, Jebb died in a nursing home in Geneva in 1928, and was buried there in Saint George's cemetery. Her epitaph featured a quote from Matthew 25:40:

"Verily I say unto you, Inasmuch as ye have done it unto one of the least of these my brethren, ye have done it unto me."

On 7 February 2024, the government of Geneva had her mortal remains reburied at the Cimetière des Rois, which is considered the Genevan Panthéon, to honour her memory for her involvement to the cause of the children rights.

== Legacy ==
In 1919, Jebb and her sister Dorothy Buxton, who converted to the Society of Friends with her husband, founded Save the Children in the UK and the following year founded the international organisation the International Save the Children Union based in Geneva.

Save the Children remains active today. A blue plaque was put up in Marlborough to Eglantyne Jebb who had founded Save the Children. In error, the plaque stated Eglantyne Mary Jebb (a distant relative); it was corrected in 2019.

An expanded version of Jebb's Declaration of the Rights of the Child was adopted by the United Nations in 1959; it was one of the main inspirations behind the 1989 UN Convention on the Rights of the Child.

The Church of England remembers her life and service annually with a commemoration in its liturgical calendar on 17 December. In 2016, Jebb was featured in a series of six British stamps dedicated to humanitarians, and multiple pictures of her hang in the London National Portrait Gallery.
