= Dorothy Buxton =

British activist (1881–1963)

- Born: Dorothy Frances Jebb; 3 August 1881; Ellesmere, Shropshire, England
- Died: 8 April 1963 (age 81); Peaslake, England
- Education: Newnham College, Cambridge
- Occupation: Activist
- Known for: Founder of Save the Children
- Spouse: Charles Roden Buxton (m. 1904)
- Parent(s): Arthur Trevor Jebb and Eglantyne Louisa Jebb
- Relatives: Louisa Wilkins (sister); Dorothy Frances Jebb (sister); Eglantyne Jebb (sister); Richard Jebb (brother); Richard Claverhouse Jebb (uncle)

Dorothy Frances Buxton (née Jebb; 3 August 1881 – 8 April 1963) was an English humanitarian, social activist and commentator on Germany.

== Life ==
Dorothy Frances Jebb was born 3 August 1881 in Ellesmere, Shropshire, the youngest of three sisters born to Arthur Trevor Jebb (1839–1894) and Eglantyne Louisa Jebb. Her mother's brother was the Cambridge classicist Sir Richard Claverhouse Jebb, and Dorothy was educated at Newnham College, Cambridge.

In 1904, she married Charles Roden Buxton, at that time a Liberal politician, and the pair were active in the Liberal Party. In 1915, she joined the Women's International League for Peace and Freedom. In 1917, she and her husband left the Liberal Party for the Labour Party, and joined the Society of Friends.

During the First World War, she compiled "Notes from the Foreign Press" for Cambridge Magazine. Her writing inspired the Fight the Famine Council, founded in 1918 as an effort to alleviate starvation of civilians in Germany and Austria-Hungary during the Allied blockade of Germany in World War I, which led to the Save the Children Fund, which she and her sister, Eglantyne Jebb, founded in 1919.

In 1935, increasingly concerned at Nazi treatment of Christians in Germany, she visited Germany to see for herself. She secured an interview with Hermann Göring to raise the issue of treatment of civilians. Upon her return, she informed George Bell, Bishop of Chichester, that German Christians whom she had met "seemed oppressed and bound with the apparent necessity of extreme caution". Though her husband campaigned for appeasement of Germany, Dorothy Buxton became convinced that war was necessary against the Nazis.

During World War II, she campaigned for refugees from Nazi Germany, as well as for the welfare of German prisoners of war.

Buxton died on 8 April 1963 in Peaslake, near Guildford, aged 81. Papers relating to her and her husband are held at the London School of Economics.

== Works ==
- (with Charles Roden Buxton) The World After the war, London: G. Allen & Unwin Ltd [1920]. Translated into German by Rudolf Berger as Die Welt nach dem Weltkriege, 1921.
- The War for Coal and Iron, London: The Labour Party, [1921].
- Upper Silesia and the European Crisis, London: Fight the Famine Council [1921].
- The Challenge of Bolshevism; A New Social Ideal, London: G. Allen & Unwin, 1928.
- (ed.) Save the Child: a posthumous essay by Eglantyne Jebb. London: The Weardale Press, 1929.
- (with Edward Fuller) The White Flame: The Story of the Save the Children Fund, London, New York: Longmans, Green and Co.; London: The Weardale Press, Ltd, 1931.
- (as "An English Protestant") The Church Struggle in Germany: A Survey of Four Years, March 1933-July 1937, London, 1937.
- The Religious Crisis in Germany, London: Kulturkampf Association, [1938.]
- (ed. and tr.) I Was In Prison: Letters from German Pastors, London: Student Christian Movement Press, 1938
- The Economics of the Refugee Problem, [London]: Focus Publishing Co., [1938].
- (with Norman Angell) You and the Refugee: The Moral and Economics of the Problem, Harmondsworth: Penguin Books Ltd, 1939. Translated into Spanish by F. Fernández de la Madroñera as El crimen de nuestro tiempo: la raza blanca en peligro, 1943.
- (ed. with a foreword) Christendom on Trial: Documents of the German Church Struggle, 1938-39, London: Friends of Europe, [1939]
- (ed. and completed) Prophets of heaven & hell: Virgil, Dante, Milton, Goethe by Charles Roden Buxton. Cambridge: The University Press, 1945

== Archives ==
Archives of Save the Children, including papers of Dorothy Buxton, are held at the Cadbury Research Library, University of Birmingham.
