= Save the Children =

International humanitarian organization

- Founded: 15 April 1919; 107 years ago
- Founders: Eglantyne Jebb; Dorothy Buxton
- Type: International NGO
- Registration no.: England & Wales 213890; SC039570; EIN: 06-0726487
- Legal status: Registered company limited by guarantee
- Headquarters: London, WC2, England
- Website: www.savethechildren.net

The Save the Children Fund, commonly known as Save the Children, is a London-based international non-governmental organization. It was founded in 1919 by Eglantyne Jebb and her sister Dorothy Buxton, with the initial goal of feeding children during the Blockade of Germany. It was determined in 1921 that it would become a permanent organization after needs were recognized across Europe and Russia. The mission became "an international effort to preserve child life wherever it is menaced by conditions of economic hardship and distress".

The organization raises money to improve children's lives by creating better educational opportunities, better health care, and improved economic opportunities. It achieves this through several methods, including health, education, and protection programs. The group was one of the first organizations to assist children and work with holocaust survivors following World War II, and has been present for crisis management during the Korean War, the 1956 Hungarian Revolution, Vietnam War, and the 2014 Ebola outbreak, among others.

== Origins ==
=== Initial years ===
The Save the Children Fund was founded in London, England, on 15 April 1919 by Eglantyne Jebb and her sister Dorothy Buxton in an effort to alleviate starvation of children in Germany and Austria-Hungary during the Allied blockade of Germany of World War I which continued after the Armistice.

At the end of World War I, images of malnourished and sick children ran throughout Europe. The Fight the Famine Council was initially started earlier in 1919 to put political pressure on the British government to end the blockade, the first meeting having been held at the home of Catherine Courtney, at 15 Cheyne Walk. On 15 April 1919, the sisters separated from the council and created the "Save the Children Fund".

In May 1919, the Fund was publicly established at a meeting in London's Royal Albert Hall to "provide relief to children suffering the effects of war" and raise money for emergency aid to children suffering from wartime shortages of food and supplies.

Jebb and her sister, Buxton, worked to gain exposure to elicit aid. In December 1919, Pope Benedict XV publicly announced his support for Save the Children and declared 28 December "Innocents Day" to collect donations.

The first branch was opened in Fife, Scotland, in 1919. A counterpart, Rädda Barnen (which also means "Save the Children"), was founded later that year, on 19 November, in Sweden with Anna Kleman on the board. Along with many other organizations, they founded the International Save the Children Union in Geneva on 6 January 1920. Jebb built relationships with other Geneva-based organizations, including the International Committee of the Red Cross, who supported Save's International Foundation.

Jebb used fund-raising techniques to gain exposure, for example, making Save the Children the first charity in the United Kingdom to use page-length advertisements in newspapers. Jebb contracted doctors, lawyers, and other professionals to devise mass advertisement campaigns. In 1920, Save the Children started individual child sponsorship to engage more donors. By the end of the year, Save the Children raised the equivalent of about £8,000,000 in 2005 money.

=== Russian famine ===
By August 1921, the UK Save the Children had raised over £1,000,000, and conditions for children in Central Europe were improving due to their efforts. However, the Russian famine of 1921 made Jebb realize that Save the Children must be a permanent organization and that children's rights constantly need to be protected. Their mission was thus changed to "an international effort to preserve child life wherever it is menaced by conditions of economic hardship and distress".

From 1921 to 1923, Save the Children created press campaigns, propaganda movies, and feeding centers in Russia and Turkey to accommodate and educate thousands of refugees. They began to work with several other organizations such as the Russian Famine Relief Fund and Nansen which resulted in recognition by the League of Nations. Although Russia was largely closed off to international relief and aid, Save the Children persuaded Soviet authorities to let them have a ground presence.

At home, the Daily Express criticized the Fund's work, denying the severity of the situation and arguing they should be helping their people before helping Russia. The charity responded with increased publicity about the famine, showing images of starving children and mass graves. The campaign gained national appeal, eventually allowing the organization to charter the SS Torcello to Russia with 600 tons of relief supplies. Over 157 million rations were given out, saving nearly 300,000 children. Improved conditions meant Save the Children's Russian feeding program was able to be closed in the summer of 1923, after having won international acclaim.

=== Second World War ===
Save the Children staff were among the first into the liberated areas after World War II, working with refugee children and displaced persons in former occupied Europe, including Nazi concentration camps survivors. During this same time, work in the United Kingdom focused on improving conditions for children growing up in cities devastated by bombing and facing huge disruptions in family life.

=== Continuing crises ===
The 1950s saw a continuation of this type of crisis-driven work, with additional demands for help following the Korean War and the 1956 Hungarian Revolution, and the opening of new work in Africa, Asia, and the Middle East in response to the decline of the British empire.

Like other aid agencies, Save the Children was active in the major disasters of the era—especially the Vietnam War and the Biafra secession in Nigeria. The latter brought shocking images of child starvation onto the television screens of the West for the first time in a major way. The sort of mass-marketing campaigns first used by Save the Children in the 1920s was repeated, with great success in fundraising.

Disasters in Ethiopia, Sudan, and many other world hotspots led to appeals that brought public donations on a huge scale, and a consequent expansion of the organization's work. However, the children's rights-based approach to development originated by Jebb continues to be an important factor. It was used in a major campaign in the late 1990s against the use of child soldiers in Africa.

During the 2014 Ebola outbreak in Sierra Leone, new cases outnumbered the available hospital beds in the country. Save the Children worked with the UK government's Department for International Development and Ministry of Defence to build and run a 100-bed treatment center in Sierra Leone, as well as support an Interim Care Center in Kailahun for children who had lost their families to Ebola.

== Controversies ==
=== The Save the Children Fund Film ===
In 1969, Save the Children UK commissioned film director Ken Loach and producer Tony Garnett to make The Save the Children Fund Film. The resulting film was unacceptable to the organization because they felt it presented their work in an unfavorable light. Eventually a legal agreement was arrived at which involved the material being deposited in the National Film Archive. In 2011, roughly 42 years later, it was shown to the public for the first time.

=== Expulsion from Pakistan ===
In July 2011, the Guardian uncovered a fake vaccination program by the CIA. It then emerged that Dr. Shakil Afridi, the person organizing the CIA's "vaccinations", had claimed that he was a Save the Children employee. In May 2012, Save the Children's country director for Pakistan, David Wright, revealed that the organization's work had been badly disrupted ever since Afridi had made his claim, with medicines held up for long periods at airports, staff unable to get visas, and so forth. Wright also charged that the CIA had breached international humanitarian law and risked the safety of aid groups worldwide. "It was a setback, no doubt," said Dr. Elias Durry, the World Health Organization's polio coordinator for Pakistan, a few months later.

Later that year, in September, it was reported that the Pakistani government had requested Save the Children's foreign staff to leave the country, In January 2013, the Deans of twelve top US schools of public health sent a letter to President Obama protesting against the entanglement of intelligence operations in public health campaigns. The letter describes the negative and lasting impacts of the Central Intelligence Agency's (CIA) use of a fake vaccination campaign in Pakistan during the hunt for Osama bin Laden in 2011, which exacerbated the already persistent public mistrust of vaccines in the country.

The CIA's "vaccination program" sparked a series of deadly attacks in Pakistan against dozens of aid and health workers associated with various aid and health campaigns, with the UN-backed polio-vaccination drive repeatedly halted as a result. Up to eight polio vaccination workers were assassinated in the country during this backlash. In May 2014, the Obama administration announced that they would no longer use vaccination programs as a cover for CIA activities.

Pakistani investigators said in a July 2012 report that Shakil Afridi met 25 times with "foreign secret agents, received instructions and provided sensitive information to them." According to an early draft of a Pakistan Government report, which has not been publicly released, Afridi told investigators that the charity Save the Children helped facilitate his meeting with US intelligence agents although the charity denies the charge. The report alleges that Save the Children's Pakistan director at the time of the incident introduced Afridi to a Western woman in Islamabad and that Afridi and the woman met regularly afterward.

On 11 June 2015, Pakistani authorities ordered all Save the Children workers to leave Pakistan within 15 days, and the organisation's office in Islamabad was closed and padlocked. This saga has led to a high degree of distrust and scepticism against the validity of COVID-19 vaccines in Pakistan.

=== Complaints of inappropriate behaviour ===
The chief strategist of Save the Children UK, Brendan Cox, resigned in September 2015 over allegations of "inappropriate behaviour". The charity temporarily suspended bids for government funds due to the scandal. Cox had previously denied any wrongdoing but finally admitted to inappropriate behaviour on 18 February 2018 and quit working for his two other charities.

On 5 March 2020, the Charity Commission published an investigation report that found there had been serious weaknesses in Save the Children's workplace culture, following a probe into the charity's response to allegations of misconduct and harassment against staff between 2012 and 2015. There were five complaints of sexual harassment and thirteen of bullying between 2016 and June 2018. Save the Children UK chief executive Justin Forsyth had three complaints of misconduct directed towards him by female staff, while Brendan Cox was publicly accused of sexual assault. The charity trustees had not been sent copies of an external report on corporate culture. Since then the charity has strengthened reporting and whistle-blowing policies that now permit anonymous staff complaints.

On 22 February 2018 Forsyth resigned from UNICEF to avoid damage to the charities.

On 11 September 2020, it was announced the charity could resume bids for government funding.

=== Logo font by Eric Gill ===
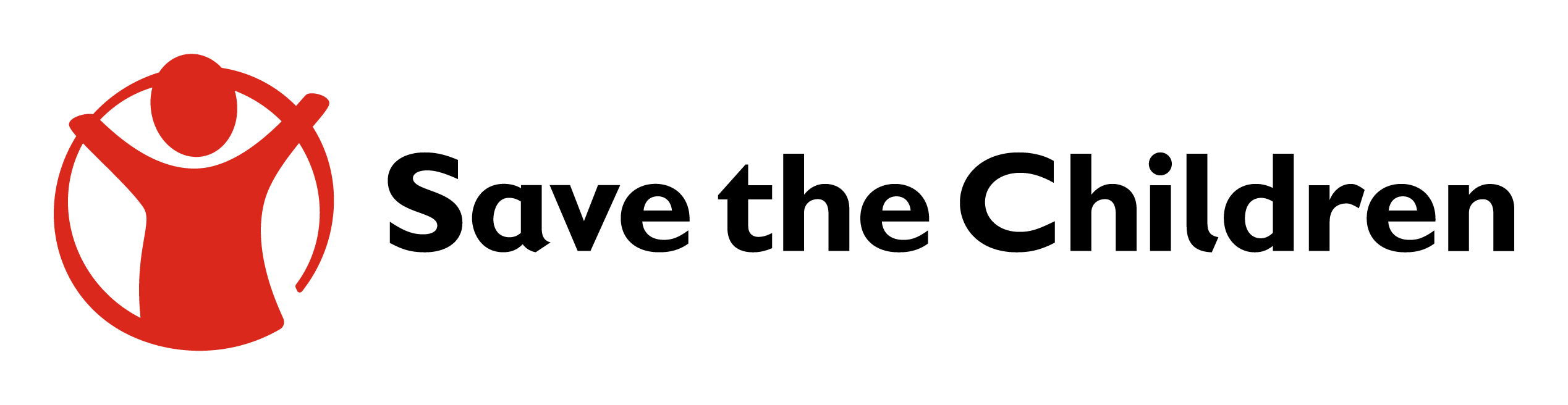
Save the Children's logo before the 2022 change

On 15 January 2022, it was announced that Save the Children would change the typeface in its logo, Gill Sans, due to its authorship in the 1920s by British artist Eric Gill, who was posthumously revealed to have documented the sexual abuse of his young daughters, an incestuous relationship with his sister and sexual experiments with his dog. An anonymous source told The Times that the organization had been previously warned of the typeface's origin before its adoption, and that the decision to change it was made one year prior. The organization effectively changed its logo that same year.

=== Allegations of bias in Gaza Conflict Response ===
Save the Children faced criticism from staff and observers over perceived bias and institutional racism during the Gaza crisis. Senior staff members denounced the organization for prioritizing Israeli hostages' concerns over the humanitarian crisis affecting Palestinians in the Gaza Strip in a widely shared internal letter. They accused the organization of failing to recognize Arab children amid ongoing violence and spoke about structural issues, including a lack of diversity among leadership. In response to the letter, Save the Children CEO Inger Ashing acknowledged the "long-standing issues" of diversity, equity and inclusion. More than 120 Save the Children staff in Gaza released an open letter accusing leadership of suppressing advocacy for Arab children to appease influential stakeholders. They cited incidents of censorship, including restrictions on addressing alleged violations by Israeli forces during a military operation in Gaza. Save the Children leadership defended the global sign-off policy as a standard applied to all conflict.

=== Allegations of institutional racism ===
Save the Children has faced allegations of institutional racism. Critics have pointed to a lack of diversity among leadership roles and decision-making bodies, with concerns that the functional leads responsible for designing the restructuring processes were predominantly from the Global North and lacked representation reflective of the organization's diverse workforce and the communities it serves. While Save the Children implemented measures such as diverse selection panels and DEI training, staff expressed skepticism about the authenticity and impact of these initiatives.

In September 2024, the organization released a new global salary scale that was widely criticized for containing perceived systemic biases. These salary proposals were characterized as "inherently racist" by staff, citing stark disparities between pay for roles in the Global North and Global South. For example, comparable roles in Belgium and Sri Lanka were assigned vastly different pay scales, with the latter being far below local living standards and in some cases even below national minimum wages. National contract holders allegedly received no severance packages at all while employees in wealthier nations were offered more substantial redundancy terms.

== Structure ==
Save the Children is an international umbrella organization, with 30 national member organizations serving over 120 countries. Members lead on activities within their home territory and work with donors to develop programs abroad, which are coordinated and delivered by a central body – Save the Children International – via teams on the ground in each country. Save the Children International also oversees humanitarian responses.

All members of the association are bound by affiliation the International organisation to Save the Children Alliance Bylaws which include The Child Protection Protocol and Code of Conduct. These set a standard for common values, principles, and beliefs.

=== Save the Children International ===
Save the Children International, formerly known as the International Save The Children Alliance, is a worldwide non-profit organization that aims to improve the lives of children. There are 30 Save the Children member organizations around the world.

The Save the Children Alliance was founded in Geneva in 1972 by a number of Save the Children members, to coordinate their work. In 1997, a more formal structure was set up, and the organisation was renamed the International Save the Children Alliance. Soon afterward, a permanent secretariat was set up in London. This was later moved to Geneva but currently is based once more in London. Since 2010 it has been known as Save the Children International. It continues the worldwide aims of the original Save the Children organization, which was founded in 1919 in London and became part of the International Save the Children Union founded in Geneva in 1920. Save the Children was founded in 1919 after the First World War. It was founded in the United Kingdom by Eglantyne Jebb, a British social reformer, and her sister Dorothy, to improve the lives of children through better education, economic help, emergency aid, and health care in the United Kingdom. In 1924, the League of Nations adopted Jebb's charter on children's rights. In 2026, Save the Children reported that the civil war in Sudan had created one of the world's worst education crises, leaving around half of all school-age children, over eight million, out of school for approximately 500 days.

=== Save the Children Australia ===
Save the Children Australia is one of the largest independent aid and development agencies working to improve the lives of children across Australia, the Pacific, and around the world. As a member of the global Save the Children International network, it delivers programs that protect children from harm, ensure access to quality education and healthcare, respond to humanitarian emergencies, and advocate for children's rights.

In 1919, Eglantyne Jebb, a British teacher, sociologist, and humanitarian, founded Save the Children in England in response to the suffering of children in Central Europe after the First World War. Jebb drafted the original Declaration of the Rights of the Child, adopted by the League of Nations in 1924, which later inspired the United Nations' Convention on the Rights of the Child. That same year, Cecilia Annie John, an Australian opera singer, pacifist, and feminist, established the first Save the Children branch in Melbourne. John had been active in international peace movements and returned from the 1919 Women's International Peace Conference in Zurich determined to create an Australian branch to support children affected by war in Europe. Throughout the 20th century, Save the Children expanded its programs in Australia, including preschools, health and welfare services, and programs for Aboriginal and Torres Strait Islander children. In 2015, Save the Children Australia merged with Good Beginnings Australia, a national early childhood and parenting organisation, significantly expanding its domestic footprint. In 2022, Mat Tinkler was appointed Chief Executive Officer, succeeding Paul Ronalds. That same year, the organisation rebranded its domestic programs under the new sub-brand 54 reasons, to place children's rights and voices at the centre of its work in Australia.

=== Save the Children Jordan ===
Save the Children Jordan is located in the Jordanian capital of Amman and represents the Jordanian branch of the UK's Save the Children. Save the Children Jordan was founded in 1974. As of March 2016, the organization was headed by its CEO, Manal Wazani, and Princess Basma bint Talal. Save the Children has operated in Jordan since 1985 and transitioned to Save the Children International in 2012.

=== Save the Children India ===
Bal Raksha Bharat (English: Child Protection India), commonly known as Save the Children India, is a non-profit organization working to improve the lives of marginalized children in India since 2008. Headquartered in Gurugram, and registered as Bal Raksha Bharat in India (under Societies Registration Act, 1861), the organization is a member of Save the Children International (formerly known as the International Save The Children Alliance)

While Save the Children has been working in India since the 1940s, Save the Children India formally came into being as Bal Raksha Bharat in April 2008. Since then it has reached 10.1 million children. The organization implements sustainable, community-driven projects across India from remote locations to urban areas. The goal of these projects is to provide children with quality education and healthcare, protection from harm and abuse, and life-saving aid during emergencies.

Bal Raksha Bharat also works through Advocacy and Campaigning, liaising with government stakeholders and civil society in support of children’s rights.

==== History ====
As World War I drew to an end in 1919, Eglantyne Jebb launched a movement named Save the Children Fund to cater to the needs of children whose lives were affected by the war. She was driven by the belief that all children have the right to a healthy, happy, and fulfilling life. Three years later in 1922, she drafted a document named ‘Declaration of the Rights of the Child’. The declaration contained a number of proclamations intended to provide and safeguard certain universal rights for children. It was this declaration that would become the axis around which the United Nations Convention on the Rights of the Child (UNCRC) would revolve.

In 1924, the League of Nations, the precursor to the United Nations adopted Jebb’s declaration. What started as an emergency relief fund went on to become a major worldwide movement for protecting the rights of children. The first connection between Save the Children and India was made when Mahatma Gandhi signed Jebb’s declaration in 1931.

In the early 1940s, when World War II broke out, Save the Children provided relief and rehabilitation to the affected children. Hundreds of thousands of children received relief in the form of clothing and shoes. More than 800,000 books were distributed in schools. In India, a child welfare centre in Kolkata was supported and this marked the entry of the organization in India. After the war ended, Save the Children began work with displaced children, refugees and concentration camp survivors in the devastated areas of France, Yugoslavia, Greece, Austria, and Poland.

In the 1950s and 1960s, Save the Children worked extensively in Asia. Children affected by the Korean War were provided essential relief. In 2004, when a devastating Tsunami struck the South-East coast of India, Save the Children provided a rapid relief response that continued for several months. Four years later, in April 2008, Save the Children started functioning as an independent Indian member of the Save the Children International Alliance under the name Bal Raksha Bharat.

==== Campaigns ====
In 2016, Save the Children launched #EveryLastChild, a global campaign to reach out to the most excluded and forgotten children in the world through advocacy, fundraising and program work. The defined objectives for the campaign were: a fair chance for all children should be there, all children should be treated equally and there should be accountability which can be great to children. Bal Raksha Bharat reached around 700,000 children as a part of this campaign.

Through #TheInvisibles campaign, Bal Raksha Bharat sought to address the most vital issues of children living in street situations. The organization believes that these are perhaps the most deprived children in India, who are all around us yet “invisibles”, that is their issues and needs are often ignored. Through this campaign, the organization worked to address the biggest problem these children face – lack of identity. This was done by the means of providing them an Aadhaar Card and linking them to various government programs.

The #Vote4Children campaign has been rolled out twice: in the run to 2014 and 2019 General Elections in India. Through the campaign, Save the Children prepared a Children’s Manifesto which is a Charter of Demands children have from their political representatives. This manifesto was presented by children in Save the Children’s intervention areas to MPs, MLAs and politicians of various constituencies. An online petition encouraging people to support the campaign was also floated. In 2019, the organization entered its 100th year globally. Bal Raksha Bharat will focus on mobilizing commitments, partners, and resources for seven “Big Ideas” and contribute towards India’s progress for achieving the Sustainable Development Goals 2030.

== Jalalabad terror attack ==
On 24 January 2018, militants affiliated with Islamic State of Iraq and the Levant – Khorasan Province launched a bomb and gun attack on a Save the Children office in Jalalabad, a city in the eastern Afghan province of Nangarhar, killing six people and injuring 27.

== Death of Hisham al-Hakimi ==
The detention and death of Save the Children International's Yemen Country Office safety and security director, Hisham al-Hakimi, in 2023 led to scrutiny of the organisation's country and regional management. Al-Hakimi was detained by Houthi authorities in Sanaa on 9 September 2023 and died in custody the following month.

Following his death, Yemeni human-rights activists and local media raised allegations concerning Rama Hansraj, then Save the Children's country director in Yemen. A human-rights activist who had been in contact with al-Hakimi before his detention alleged that Hansraj had told Houthi authorities that al-Hakimi opposed restrictions imposed by the group and was seeking to redirect Save the Children projects to areas controlled by the internationally recognised government. Yemeni media also reported that al-Hakimi had raised concerns about the Yemen office with Save the Children's Regional Office in Jordan before his detention.

The allegations followed a period of internal conflict within the Yemen office. After an anonymous social-media post accused Hansraj of diverting aid to the Houthis, she attended a meeting with the Houthi-linked Supreme Council for the Management and Coordination of Humanitarian Affairs and International Cooperation (SCMCHA). Save the Children staff who attended became concerned that Hansraj might have identified colleagues as responsible for the accusations after they were asked to leave part of the meeting. Hansraj denied giving the authorities any names.

After learning of the liaison officers' concerns, al-Hakimi submitted reports by email and through Save the Children's whistleblowing reporting system to the Regional Office in Jordan, stating that he feared arrest. A former senior employee who saw the reports said that al-Hakimi believed Hansraj had blamed him and members of his team for the social-media posts and that her actions were placing him at risk. Save the Children confirmed that al-Hakimi had told Regional Office leadership before his detention that he believed he was in danger and that relocation had been discussed with him. Hansraj subsequently left Yemen and was dismissed from the organisation approximately a month before Save the Children was informed of al-Hakimi's death. No evidence was found establishing that her actions caused his arrest or that her dismissal was specifically connected to his case.

Scrutiny also extended to Save the Children's Middle East, North Africa and Eastern Europe (MENAEE) regional office, which was headed by Ekin Ogutogullari, regional director since January 2022. The regional office had been aware of significant problems in the Yemen operation before al-Hakimi's detention. Earlier in 2023, regional leadership sent two employees to assess the country office. Staff later described the resulting assessment as highly critical and the office as "highly dysfunctional". Regional colleagues also received al-Hakimi's warnings that he feared being detained.

After al-Hakimi's death, Ogutogullari told employees that the organisation did not know the circumstances of his death or the reason for his detention and would seek an investigation. Save the Children commissioned an external legal investigation in November 2023 and an independent management review the following month. The reviews found that incident-management processes had failed to meet the needs of staff in Yemen, that risk-management procedures had not been followed and that concerns submitted through Datix had not been addressed quickly enough. They also found that oversight by the MENAEE regional office and central management had failed, that leadership had not identified the deteriorating situation in Yemen quickly enough, and that some senior staff in the regional office and central organisation had failed to comply with organisational policies and procedures. The findings were characterised as "fundamental failures of leadership, process, and accountability". The published summary did not identify the individual senior staff to whom those findings applied.

Save the Children advertised the MENAEE regional director position on 16 February 2024, while the reviews were under way. Jeremy Stoner was serving as regional director by June 2024. The permanent position was advertised again in July, and Ahmad Alhendawi was appointed regional director in November 2024.

== Save the Children Global Ventures (SCGV) ==
In 2022, Save the Children launched Save the Children Global Ventures (SCGV), a charitable foundation incorporated in Switzerland. SCGV's purpose is to catalyze private sector investment through impact investing and other innovative financial approaches to transform the lives of the world's most vulnerable children.

== Archives ==
Archives of Save the Children are held at the Cadbury Research Library, University of Birmingham.

== Sponsors ==
Save the Children has a 'strategic partnership' with Juventus FC in Italy as of 2018.

== See also ==
- Child Development Index
- Children in emergencies and conflicts
- Christmas Jumper Day
- Gopali Youth Welfare Society
- International Save the Children Union
- Save the Children State of the World's Mothers report
- Declaration of the Rights of the Child
- Convention on the Rights of the Child
- NetHope
- Odisha State Child Protection Society
- Refugee children
- Street Kids International
- Think of the children
- UNICEF
