= Wenlock =

Wenlock may refer to:

== Places ==
=== United Kingdom ===
- Little Wenlock, a village in Shropshire
- Much Wenlock, a town in Shropshire
  - (Much) Wenlock (UK Parliament constituency)
  - Wenlock Priory, a 7th/12th-century monastery
- Wenlock Basin, a canal basin in London
- Wenlock Edge, a limestone escarpment near Much Wenlock

=== Elsewhere ===
- Wenlock, Queensland, Australia
- Wenlock, Essex County, Vermont, USA
- Wenlock River, Queensland, Australia

== People ==
- Baron Wenlock, a title created three times in the Peerage of England and of the United Kingdom
  - John Wenlock, 1st Baron Wenlock
  - Robert Lawley, 1st Baron Wenlock (1768–1834)
  - Paul Thompson, 1st Baron Wenlock (1784–1852)
  - Beilby Lawley, 2nd Baron Wenlock (1818–1880)
  - Beilby Lawley, 3rd Baron Wenlock (1849–1912)
  - Arthur Lawley, 6th Baron Wenlock (1860–1932)
- Milburga of Wenlock (died 715), Benedictine abbess of Wenlock Abbey

== Geology ==
- Wenlock epoch, the second series of the Silurian
- Wenlock Group or Wenlockian, the middle series of strata in the Silurian (Upper Silurian) of Great Britain
  - Wenlock Series lagerstätte, a highly preserved formation in the limestone Wenlock Series of Herefordshire, England
- Wenlock Limestone, a stratigraphic unit in the United Kingdom
- Wenlock Shale, a stratigraphic unit in the United Kingdom

== Other ==
- Wenlock, Craven Arms and Lightmoor Extension railway, a former railway in Shropshire, England
- Much Wenlock and Severn Junction railway, a former railway in Shropshire, England
- The Wenlock Arms, a public house in London
- Wenlock Olympian Society Annual Games, a forerunner of the modern Olympic Games dating from 1850, held each year in Much Wenlock
- Wenlock and Mandeville, the official mascots for the 2012 Summer Olympics and Paralympics being held in London, United Kingdom

== See also ==
- On Wenlock Edge (song cycle), of 1909 by Ralph Vaughan Williams, to texts by A. E. Housman
