= Mary King-Milbanke, Countess of Lovelace =

Artist, architect, and author (died 1941)

The Right Honourable The Countess of Lovelace
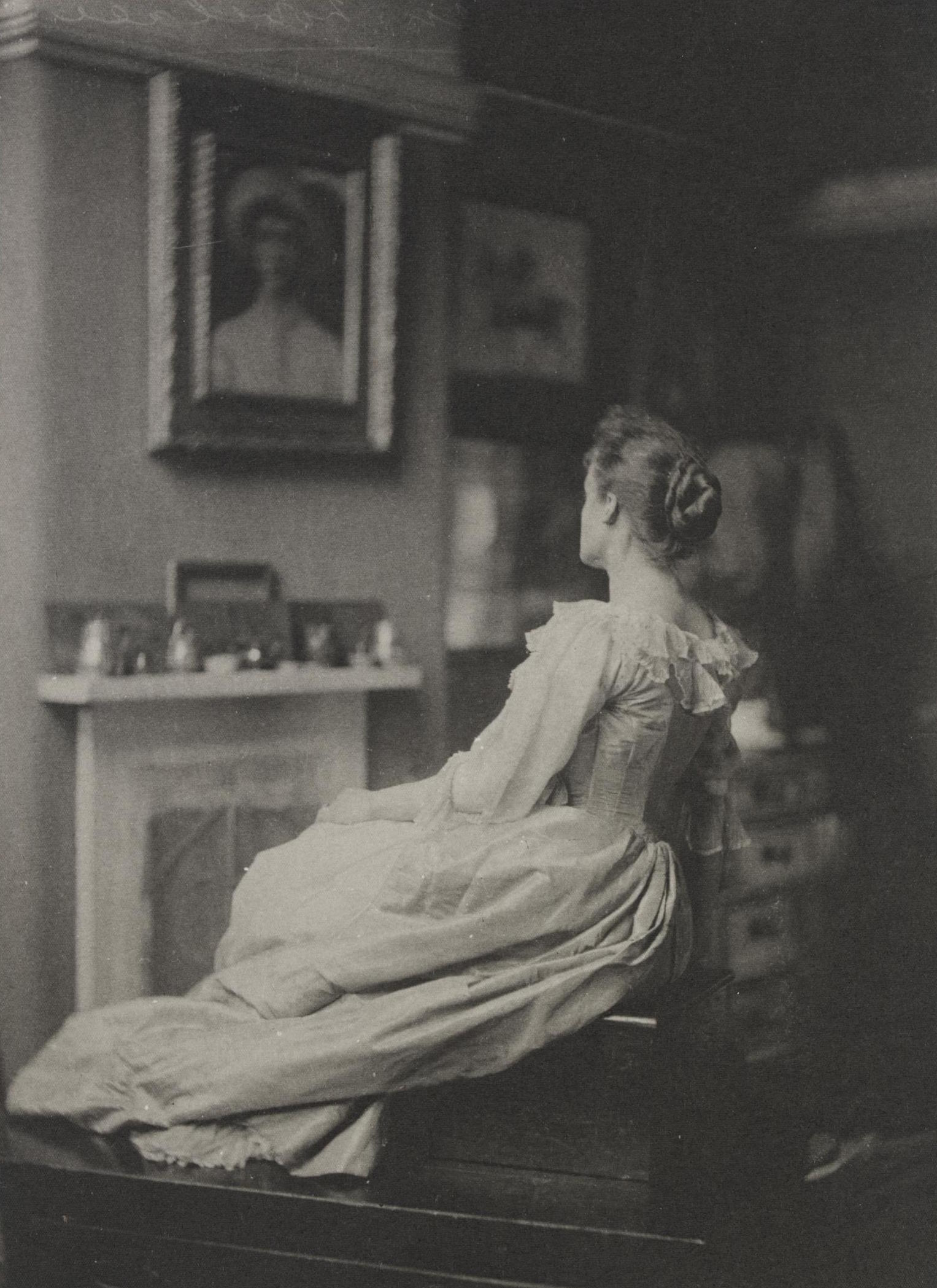
- Born: Mary Caroline Stuart-Wortley; 10 May 1848
- Died: 18 April 1941 (aged 92)
- Occupations: Artist, architect, author
- Spouse: Ralph King-Milbanke, 2nd Earl of Lovelace (m. 1880; died 1906)
- Parents: The Rt. Hon James Stuart-Wortley (father); The Hon. Jane Thompson (mother)

Mary King-Milbanke, Countess of Lovelace (1848–1941) was a member of the British nobility through birth and later marriage. Mary was an artist, architect, and author.

== Background and early years ==
Born Mary Caroline Stuart-Wortley. She was a member of the British upper-class with maternal connections to the Barons Wenlock and paternal links to the Barons Wharncliffe (later Earl of Wharncliffe). She grew up in St James Place, London with her parents and siblings.

Her father was British politician James Stuart-Wortley, who sat as an MP for Halifax in the mid to late 1830s and for a period of about seventeen years, an MP for Bute.

Her mother was noted philanthropist Jane Stuart-Wortley (nee the Hon. Jane Lawley), who was a supporter for London district nursing and causes for the betterment of the poorer classes. She was a daughter of the 1st Baron Wenlock.

Her siblings included artist and illustrator Archibald John Stuart-Wortley, Conservative politician and Under-Secretary of State for the Home Department, Charles, 1st Baron Stuart of Wortley, and novelist, administrator and artist Caroline who married into a junior branch of the Grosvenor family through her marriage to Norman Grosvenor, son of the 1st Baron Ebury.

== Career ==
She trained as an artist at the Slade School in Gower Street, an undertaking made more difficult by requiring accompaniment on the journey to and from so as to maintain respectability.

After marrying, she continued painting, exhibiting at the Grosvenor Gallery, as well as training with a firm of architects in 1893 that included C.F.A. Voysey, an architect and furniture and textile designer who worked in the Arts and Crafts style, a movement that influenced her considerably. This training gave her the ability to design and improve cottages on her husband's properties at Ockham Park, Surrey, and Ashley Combe, Somerset.

According to the "Historic Ockham" Facebook group, she designed the Parish Rooms and the Lovelace Cottages which were gifted to the villagers of Ockham. During the First World War, she organized the reconstruction of a small harbour at Porlock Weir which, upon completion, was able to supply timber for the building of trenches.

Ockham Parish Rooms designed by Lady Lovelace, demolished in 2022. Photo by Garry Walton.

Additionally, she was a member of the Chelsea Society, a charitable society concerned with architecture, land use, and infrastructural planning within the Chelsea area of London, as well as a committee member of the Home Arts and Industries Association (HAIA), an arts education society based in London, and the Kyrle Society, who campaigned for ‘open spaces" as well as the Recreational Evening Class Movement.

== Lillycombe House ==
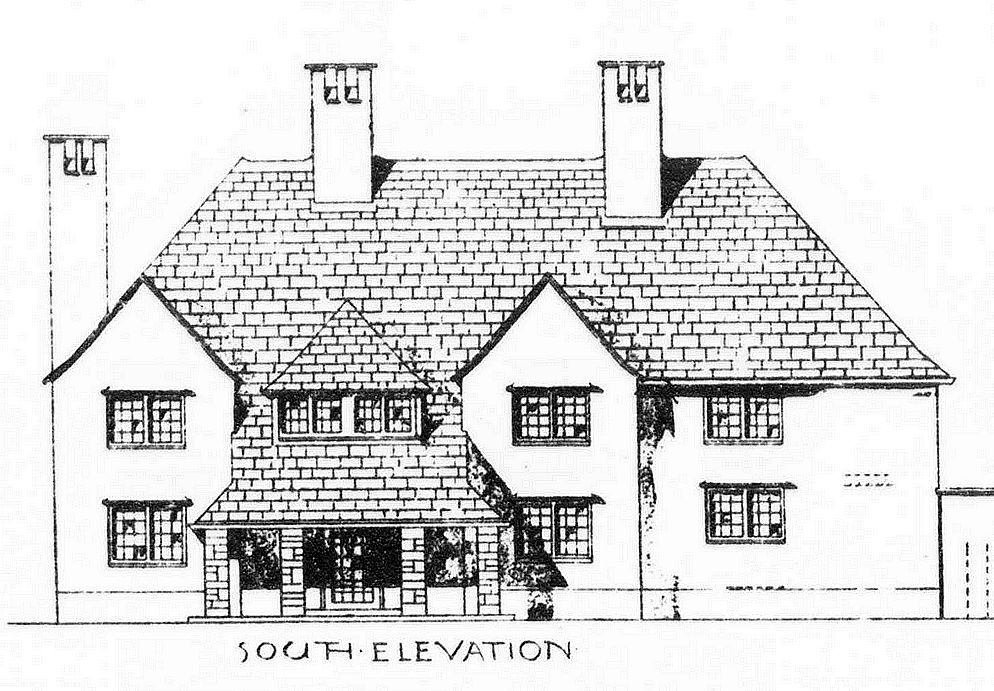
Lillycombe South Elevation drawing by Lady Lovelace assisted by C.F.A. Voysey.

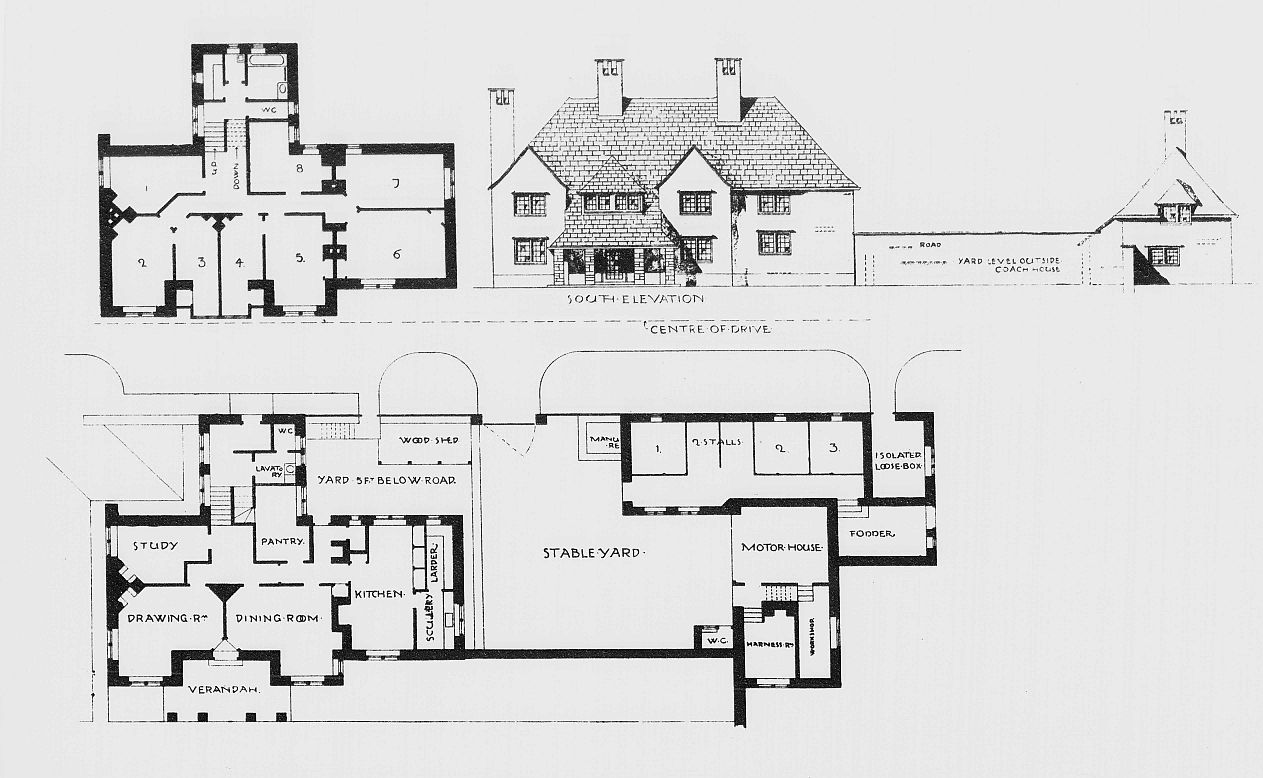
Lillycombe House plan and elevation by Lady Lovelace assisted by C.F.A. Voysey

The most well documented architectural work of Lady Lovelace is a work attributed to C.F.A. Voysey called the Lilleycombe House, built near Porlock, Somerset. Due to the latter's notoriety, it was featured in The British Architect in 1912, before construction, described as such:

"This house has been designed by Mary, Countess of Lovelace, assisted by Mr. C.F.A. Voysey, of 23, York Place, W. It is to be built in local stone and cement roughcast, and roofed with Delabode slates. The site being a steep slope to the south overlooking a great valley, with Exmoor beyond, will account for the varying levels of the floors. Every precaution was necessary to guard against the south-west winds."

== As author ==
Mary was also a writer and editor; she wrote the introduction and edited a book by her husband, titled Astarte, about his grandfather, Lord Byron, the famous poet. Additionally, she published a memoir about her husband.

== As public figure ==
Due to her work in multiple disciplines, including philanthropy, Lady Mary Lovelace has been described by art historian Anne Anderson as a "lady reformer" or "’New Woman’ of the era who quietly reshaped the roles and responsibilities of women in later Victorian and Edwardian England." While she is remembered as working towards the advancement of women, her brand of feminism is described as "want[ing] to gain admittance into the world of policy making, not disrupt[ing] it." As a notable woman of her time, Mary was portrayed in Edward Burne-Jones' famous painting, The Golden Stairs.

== Marriage and Titles ==
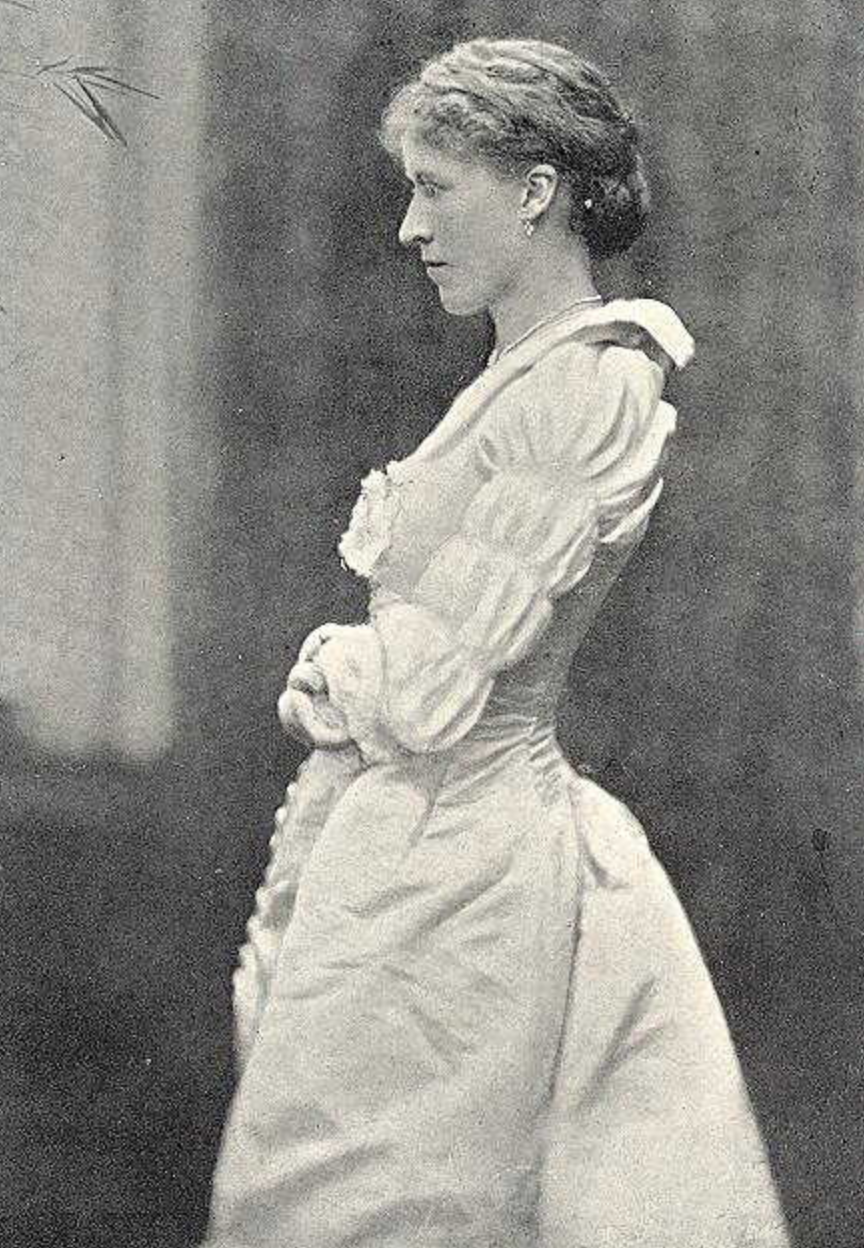
Mary Caroline Stuart-Wortley on her wedding day, 30 December 1880.

In 1880, Stuart-Wortley married Ralph King-Milbanke, then 13th Baron Wentworth. At the time, she was thirty-two which was an age considered old for a bride. There was no children from this marriage.

Upon the marriage, she first become Baroness (Lady) Wentworth but years later, in 1893, her husband succeeded to the title of Earl of Lovelace. Through this title, she was now entitled to the style and address as the Countess of Lovelace until her death many years later.

== Burial ==
Lady Lovelace's ashes are buried in All Saints' Church, Ockham. The church's King Chapel, intended as a chapel over the family vault, still contains the funerary urn with her ashes and those of the 2nd Earl of Lovelace. The urn has the form of a stone casket on monolithic pedestal with heraldic enamel plaques.
