= Malcolm Little (disambiguation) =

Malcolm X (1925–1965), named Malcolm Little at birth, was an American Muslim minister and human rights activist who later changed his name to el-Hajj Malik el-Shabazz.

Malcolm Little may also refer to:

- Malcolm Orme Little (1857–1931), British Army cavalry officer and champion polo player
- Malcolm Archibald Albert Little (1904–1944), British Army colonel and polo player; son of Malcolm Orme Little

== See also ==
- Little Malcolm, 1974 British comedy drama film
