= Robert Lawley =

Robert Lawley may refer to:

- Robert Lawley, 1st Baron Wenlock (1768–1834), British landowner and politician
- Sir Robert Lawley, 5th Baronet (c. 1736–1793), his father, English landowner and politician
