= Archibald Little (British Army officer) =

British Army officer (1810–1891)

General Sir Archibald Little GCB
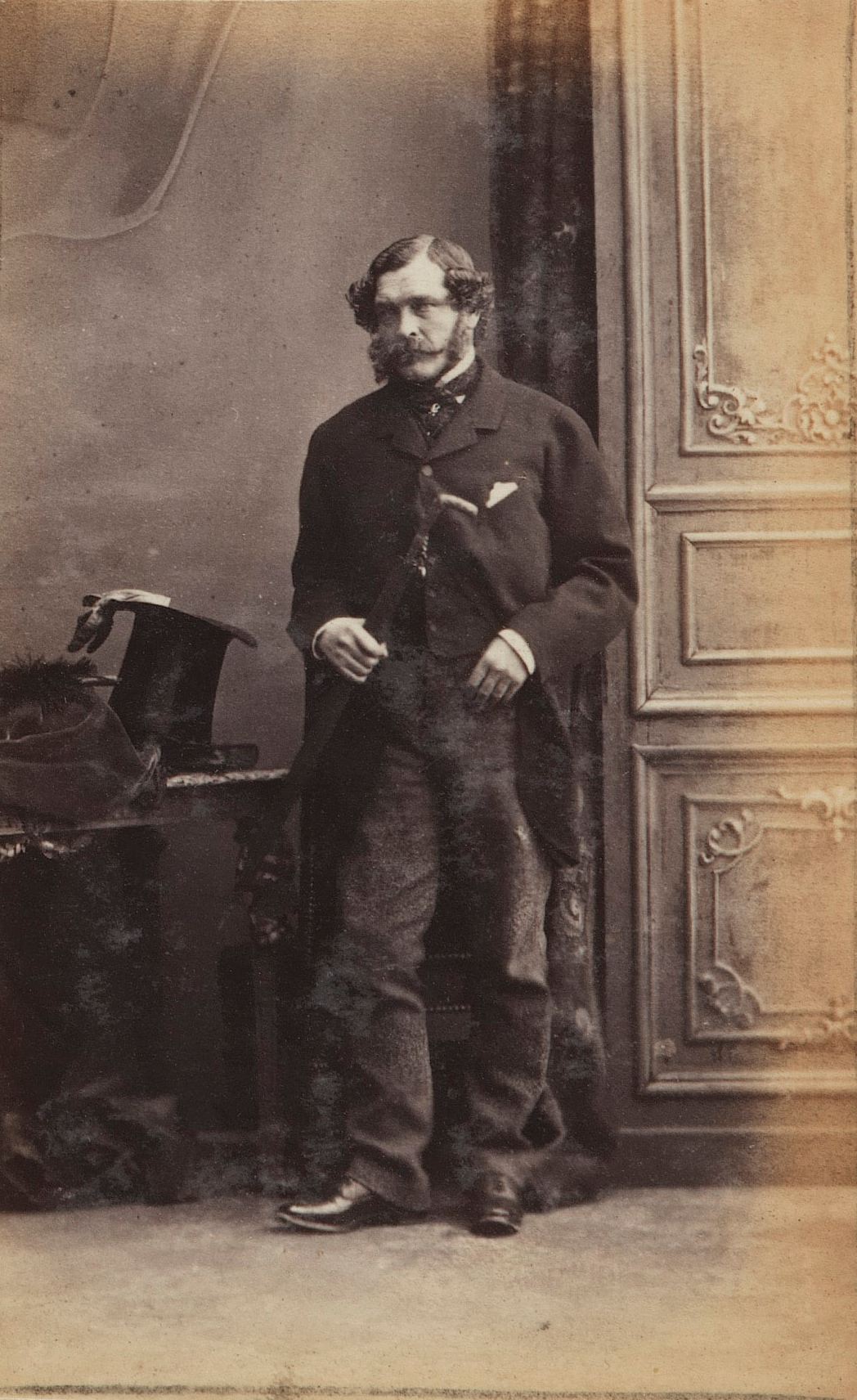
- Portrait by Camille Silvy, 1861
- Born: 7 September 1810; Camberwell, London
- Died: 10 June 1891 (aged 80); Upton House, Tetbury, Gloucestershire
- Spouse(s): Jane Orme (1854–1868) Elizabeth Loftus Sheldon (m. 1870; died 1888)
- Children: 7, including Malcolm Orme Little
- Relatives: Malcolm Archibald Albert Little (grandson); Ian Little (grandson)

General Sir Archibald Little GCB (7 September 1810 – 10 June 1891) was a British Army officer who was Colonel of the 9th Lancers.

== Early life ==
Little was born in 1810 at Camberwell, London. He was the son of Archibald Little of Shabden Park, Surrey, and Agnes Oliver. Among his siblings was Helen Little (wife of Sir Thomas Buchan-Hepburn, 3rd Baronet), Jane Little (wife of James St Clair, 14th Lord Sinclair), and Capt. James Lockhart Little of the 81st Regiment of Foot.

His paternal grandparents were Matthew Little and Helen Pasley (a daughter of James Pasley).

== Career ==
Little was commissioned as a cornet in the 9th Lancers on 4 October 1831. He was promoted to Lieutenant in 1832, Captain in 1837, Major in 1850, Lieutenant-Colonel in 1854, Colonel in 1857, Major-General in 1868, Lieutenant General in 1877, and General in 1880.

He served with the 9th Lancers in the First Anglo-Sikh War of 1846, and was at the Battle of Sobraon. In the Indian Rebellion of 1857, he commanded the cavalry at the Siege of Lucknow where he was injured in the elbow by a musket-ball. He was appointed Knight Grand Cross, Order of the Bath for commanding a post at Dilkoosha in November 1857. At Kanpur, he commanded cavalry and three Troops of Horse Artillery, and pursued the rebels of Gwalior and fighting at Saraighat. For his efforts, he was mentioned in dispatches three times. He was commanding officer of the 9th Lancers after the Indian Rebellion, from 1858 to 1861, and was appointed Colonel of the Regiment from 8 March 1875, succeeding Gen. Sir James Hope Grant and serving until his death on 10 June 1891.

== Personal life ==
On 7 June 1854 at St James's Church, Piccadilly, London, Little was married to Jane Orme (1830–1868), daughter of Malcolm Orme and Jane Bonsor. Before her death at Rathdown in County Dublin in 1868, they were the parents of seven children, including:

- Florence Little, who married Alfred Brocklehurst, son of Henry Brocklehurst and Anne Fielden, in 1884.
- Archibald Cosmo Little (1855–1934), a Major in the 5th Royal Irish Lancers; he married Lady Guendolen (née Chetwynd-Talbot) Chaplin, a widow of Edward Chaplin, MP for Lincoln, and daughter of Charles Chetwynd-Talbot, 19th Earl of Shrewsbury, in 1887.
- Malcolm Orme Little (1857–1931), a Brig.-Gen. who married Iris Hermione Brassey, the daughter of Albert Brassey, MP for Banbury, and the Hon. Matilda Bingham (a daughter of the 4th Baron Clanmorris), in 1903.
- Charles Hope Little (1862–1918), a Lt.-Col. in the 4th Battalion, Wiltshire Regiment; he married Mildred Dora Ward.
- Archibald Oliver Little (1863–1920)
- Violet Edith Little (b. 1865)
- Jean Orme Little (b. 1868), who married Maj. Francis Hubert Wise in 1898.

After her death, he married Elizabeth (née Loftus) Sheldon (1824–1888), daughter of Lt.-Gen. William Francis Bentinck Loftus, Colonel of the 50th (Queen's Own) Regiment of Foot, and Margaret Harriet Langrishe (a daughter of Very Rev. James Langrishe), on 7 April 1870 at Holy Trinity Church, in Westcott, Surrey. Elizabeth was widowed from Edward Ralph Charles Sheldon (son of Edward Ralph Charles Sheldon, MP for South Warwickshire).

Elizabeth, Lady Little, died in 1888 at Upton House in Tetbury, Gloucestershire. Upton House was a Neoclassical country house built in 1752, whose design is usually attributed to William Halfpenny, of Bristol. Sir Archibald died on 10 June 1891, also at Upton House.

=== Descendants ===
Through his son Malcolm, he was a grandfather of Malcolm Archibald Albert Little (1904–1944), a Colonel in the 9th Lancers, and Ian Little (1918–2012), a leading economist.

Through his daughter Florence, he was a grandfather of Nancye Brocklehurst (d. 1977), who married Sackville Pelham, 5th Earl of Yarborough (a son of Charles Pelham, 4th Earl of Yarborough and Hon. Marcia Lane-Fox).
