= Francis Lawley =

Francis Lawley may refer to:

- Francis Charles Lawley, British journalist and politician
- Sir Francis Lawley, 2nd Baronet, English courtier and politician
- Sir Francis Lawley, 7th Baronet, English politician
