= Sir John Watson =

Sir John Watson may refer to:

- Sir John Watson Gordon (1788–1864), Scottish painter
- Sir John Watson (polo), English polo player and winner of the International Polo Cup in 1876
- Sir John Watson (Indian Army officer) (1829–1919), English recipient of the Victoria Cross in 1857
- Sir John Watson (advocate) (1883–1944), Scottish advocate and sheriff, Solicitor General for Scotland 1929–31
