= Ian Little =

Ian Little may refer to:

- Ian Little (economist) (1918–2012), British economist
- Ian Little (footballer) (born 1973), Scottish footballer
- Ian Little, British record producer on Duran Duran albums such as Seven and the Ragged Tiger
