= Richard Lawley, 4th Baron Wenlock =

British Army officer (1856–1918)

- Born: 21 August 1856; Escrick, Yorkshire, England
- Died: 25 July 1918 (aged 61); Hestercombe, Taunton, Devon, England
- Military career
- Allegiance: United Kingdom
- Branch: Army
- Service years: 1876–1904
- Rank: Lieutenant-Colonel
- Commands: 7th Queen's Own Hussars
- Conflicts: Second Boer War
- Awards: Companion of the Order of the Bath
- Father: Beilby Lawley, 2nd Baron Wenlock
- Relatives: Arthur Lawley (brother); Beilby Lawley (brother)

Lieutenant-Colonel Richard Thompson Lawley, 4th Baron Wenlock, CB (21 August 1856 – 25 July 1918) was a British Army officer and polo champion who became the 4th Baron Wenlock and the 11th Lawley Baronet of Spoonhill in 1912.

== Early life ==
Lawley was born on 21 August 1856, the second son and sixth child of Beilby Lawley the 2nd Baron Wenlock and his wife Lady Elizabeth (née Grosvenor).

== Military service ==
Lawley joined the British Army and was commissioned as a lieutenant in the 7th Hussars on 11 February 1876. He served in the Nile Expedition of 1884–1885, and was promoted to captain on 21 July 1885, to major on 5 May 1893, and to lieutenant-colonel on 26 June 1899. In 1902 he served in South Africa during the Second Boer War, for which he was mentioned in despatches (dated 8 April 1902) and was appointed a Companion of the Order of the Bath (CB). He was later colonel commanding the 7th Hussars.

== Polo ==
He won the International Polo Cup in 1886 for Britain alongside John Henry Watson, Captain Thomas Hone, and Brigadier-General Malcolm Orme Little.

== Family life ==
He succeeded to the title of Baron Wenlock on the death of his brother Beilby Lawley, who had no son to whom to pass on the title. In 1909 he married Rhoda Edith Knox-Little.

Wenlock died on 25 July 1918 at his home at Hestercombe near Taunton, Devon, aged 61. He had no children so his younger brother, Algernon George Lawley, became the 5th Baron Wenlock.

Peerage of the United Kingdom
Preceded by Beilby Lawley	Baron Wenlock; 1912–1918	Succeeded by Algernon George Lawley
