= James Stuart-Wortley (Conservative politician) =

British politician (1805-1881)

The Right Honourable James Stuart-Wortley QC
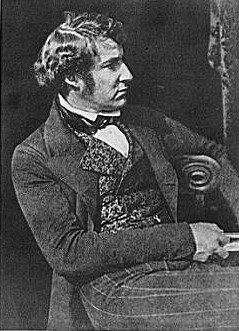
- Photograph by Arnold Genthe

Member of Parliament (MP) for Halifax
- In office 1835–1837
- Preceded by: Rawdon Briggs; Sir Charles Wood
- Succeeded by: Sir Charles Wood; Edward Davis Protheroe

Member of Parliament (MP) for Bute
- In office 1842–1859
- Preceded by: Sir William Rae, Bt
- Succeeded by: David Mure

Solicitor General for England and Wales
- In office 1856–1857
- Preceded by: Sir Richard Bethell
- Succeeded by: Sir Henry Singer Keating

Personal details
- Born: 3 July 1805
- Died: 22 August 1881 (aged 76) London, England
- Party: Conservative, Peelite
- Spouse: Jane Lawley (m. 1846–1881)
- Children: 9
- Parents: James Archibald Stuart-Wortley-Mackenzie (father); Elizabeth Crichton (mother)
- Relatives: Lady Mary Lovelace (daughter); Archibald Stuart-Wortley (son); The Lord Stuart of Wortley (son); Caroline Grosvenor (daughter)
- Education: Christ Church, Oxford

James Archibald Stuart-Wortley, PC, QC (3 July 1805 – 22 August 1881) was a British Conservative Party and Peelite politician and the husband of the philanthropist Jane Stuart-Wortley.

== Life ==
He was born in 1805, the youngest son of James Archibald Stuart-Wortley-Mackenzie, 1st Baron Wharncliffe. He was educated at Christ Church, Oxford and he became a barrister at the Inner Temple in 1831, rising to be a Queen's Counsel in 1841. He was a fellow of Merton College, Oxford.

He was elected at the 1835 general election as Member of Parliament (MP) for Halifax, but was defeated at the 1837 general election. He returned to the House of Commons in 1842, when he was elected at an unopposed by-election as MP for Bute, and held that seat until 1859. At the 1859 general election he stood in the West Riding of Yorkshire, but did not win a seat.

In 1846, he was sworn a Privy Counsellor. He held office as Recorder of London from 1850 to 1856 and then as Solicitor General for England and Wales under Lord Palmerston from November 1856 until May 1857. He had to resign in 1858 due to spinal injuries sustained in a riding accident. He and his wife left their London home in Carlton House Terrace to live at East Sheen Lodge (which was renamed Wortley Lodge) near Mortlake until he became worse, forcing them to move back to London in 1869. Back in London his wife was able to delegate the care of her husband at least in part to their daughters.

== Family ==
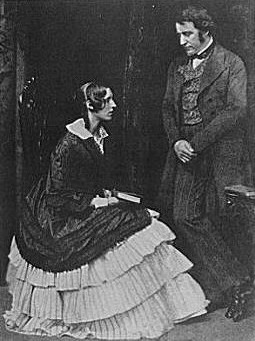
Arnold Genthe, Mr. and Mrs. James Stuart-Wortley, portrait photograph, Library of Congress

On 6 May 1846 he married Jane Lawley (1820–1900), daughter of Lord Wenlock. She died at Ripley, Surrey, on 4 February 1900, aged 79. They had four sons and five daughters:

- Mary Caroline Stuart-Wortley (10 May 1848 – 18 April 1941), married in London on 30 December 1880 Ralph King-Milbanke, 2nd Earl of Lovelace
- Archibald John Stuart-Wortley (27 May 1849 – 11 October 1905), married in 1883 Eleanor Edith Bromley (d. 1939)
- Charles Beilby Stuart-Wortley, 1st Baron Stuart of Wortley (15 September 1851 – 24 April 1926)
- William Talbot Stuart-Wortley (27 Jan 1853 - 1863)
- Margaret Jane Stuart-Wortley (21 Mar 1855 - 6 October 1937), married on 8 May 1877 Sir Reginald Talbot, son of Henry Chetwynd-Talbot, 18th Earl of Shrewsbury
- Blanche Georgina Stuart-Wortley (18 Dec 1856 - 7 July 1931), married on 26 February 1895 Frederick Firebrace (d. 1917)
- Caroline Susan Theodora Stuart-Wortley (15 Jun 1858 - 7 August 1940), married on 25 June 1881 Norman Grosvenor, son of Robert Grosvenor, 1st Baron Ebury
- James Stuart-Wortley (27 Aug 1859 - 29 Apr 1863)
- Katharine Sarah Stuart-Wortley (18 Sep 1860 - 27 March 1943), married on 1 October 1883 Gen. Sir Neville Lyttelton, son of George Lyttelton, 4th Baron Lyttelton

Parliament of the United Kingdom
Preceded by Rawdon Briggs; Sir Charles Wood	Member of Parliament for Halifax; 1835 – 1837; With: Sir Charles Wood	Succeeded by Sir Charles Wood; Edward Davis Protheroe
Preceded by Sir William Rae, Bt	Member of Parliament for Bute; 1842 – 1859	Succeeded by David Mure
Legal offices
Preceded by Sir Richard Bethell	Solicitor General for England and Wales; 1856–1857	Succeeded by Sir Henry Singer Keating
