= Lawley, South Africa =

Lawley
- Location within Gauteng Location within South Africa
- Coordinates: 26.381°S 27.808°E
- Country: South Africa
- Province: Gauteng
- Municipality: City of Johannesburg

Government
  - Councillor: Sakhile Tshenge

Area
  - Total: 6.09 km^{2} (2.35 sq mi)

Population (2011)
  - Total: 33,136
  - Density: 5,440/km^{2} (14,100/sq mi)

Racial makeup (2011)
  - Black African: 95.3%
  - Coloured: 4.1%
  - Indian/Asian: 0.2%
  - White: 0.3%
  - Other: 0.2%

First languages (2011)
  - Zulu: 28.8%
  - Sotho: 20.7%
  - Tsonga: 13.7%
  - Xhosa: 8.9%
  - Other: 28.0%
- Time zone: UTC+2 (SAST)
- Postal code (street): 1830
- PO box: 1824

Lawley is a township in the Gauteng province of South Africa and is some 8 km south of Lenasia. Named after Sir Arthur Lawley, Lieutenant-Governor of Transvaal from 1902 to 1906, when he became Governor of Madras.
