= Rawdon Briggs (politician) =

Rawdon Briggs (1792 – 29 June 1859) was a British politician.

Briggs was born in Halifax, where his father was a prominent banker. At the 1832 UK general election, he stood for the Whigs in Halifax. Although he was not a well-known figure, he was described as having a "high and unimpeachable character", and had strong local connections. He won a seat, topping the poll.

In Parliament, Briggs supported free trade and the introduction of a property tax, and argued for the gradual abolition of taxes on corn. He also argued against monopolies and for church rates to be abolished. Although he did not speak in Parliament, he attended frequently, and was an active member of various committees. He stood down at the 1835 UK general election, to look after his father, who was in poor health.

Parliament of the United Kingdom
New constituency	Member of Parliament for Halifax; 1832–1835; With: Charles Wood	Succeeded by James Stuart-Wortley; Charles Wood
