= Jane Stuart-Wortley =

English philanthropist (1820-1900)

- Born: Jane Thompson; 5 December 1820; York, England
- Died: 4 February 1900 (aged 79); Ripley, Surrey, England
- Other names: Jane Lawley
- Known for: philanthropy
- Spouse: James Stuart-Wortley (m. 1846; died 1881)
- Children: 9
- Parents: Lord Wenlock (father); Caroline Neville (mother)
- Relatives: Beilby Lawley (brother); Francis Charles Lawley (brother)

Jane Stuart-Wortley or Jane Thompson; Jane Lawley (5 December 1820 – 4 February 1900) was an English philanthropist. She was described as the best horsewoman as well as the most accomplished conversationalist of her day. Lord Cardigan, returned from the Crimea, said he never missed the morning parade at Rotten Row, his reason "Why to see that lady with the perfect figure, who manages her white Arab like a daughter of the desert."

== Life ==
Stuart-Wortley was born in York in 1820 when her surname was Thompson. Her family adopted the surname Lawley when her father became Lord Wenlock.

In 1846 she married James Stuart-Wortley. They had four sons and five daughters; two of their sons died in childhood:

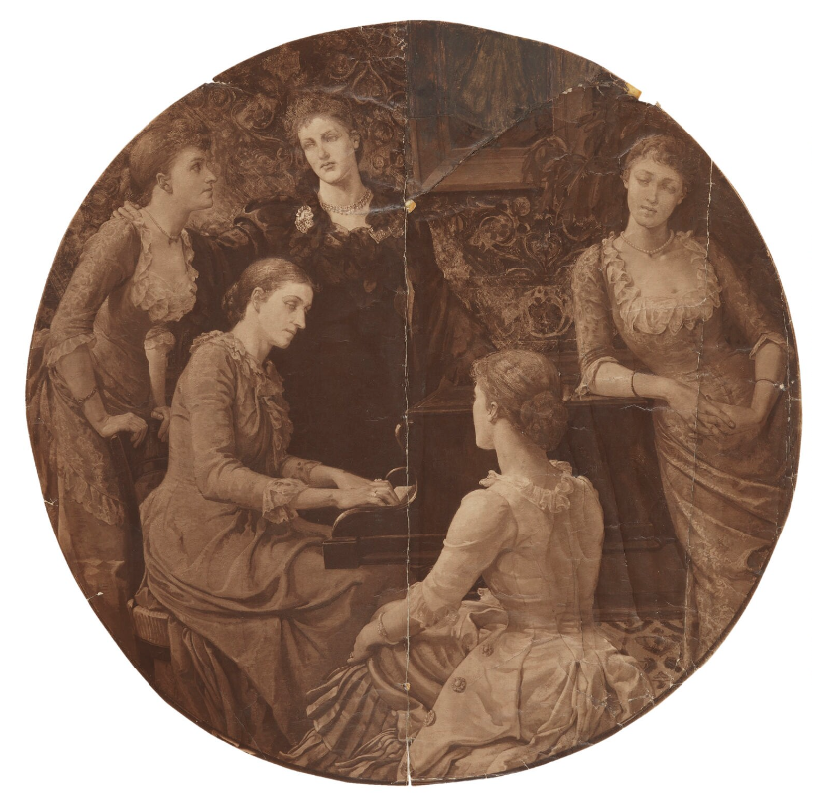
Five daughters of Jane Stuart-Wortley

- Mary Caroline Stuart-Wortley (10 May 1848 – 18 April 1941), married in London on 30 December 1880 Ralph King-Milbanke, 2nd Earl of Lovelace
- Archibald John Stuart-Wortley (27 May 1849 – 11 October 1905), married in 1883 Eleanor Edith Bromley (d. 1939)
- Charles Beilby Stuart-Wortley, 1st Baron Stuart of Wortley (15 September 1851 – 24 April 1926)
- Margaret Jane Stuart-Wortley (d. 6 October 1937), married on 8 May 1877 Sir Reginald Talbot, son of Henry Chetwynd-Talbot, 18th Earl of Shrewsbury
- Blanche Georgina Stuart-Wortley (d. 7 July 1931), married on 26 February 1895 Frederick Firebrace (d. 1917)
- Caroline Susan Theodora Stuart-Wortley (d. 7 August 1940), married on 25 June 1881 Norman Grosvenor, son of Baron Ebury
- Katharine Sarah Stuart-Wortley (d. 27 March 1943), married on 1 October 1883 Gen. Sir Neville Lyttelton, son of Baron Lyttelton

In 1846, her husband was sworn in as a Privy Counsellor. In 1852 she became a woman of influence when she inherited a considerable fortune from her father. Her husband held office as Solicitor General for England and Wales under Lord Palmerston from 1856 until May 1857. He had to resign in 1858 due to spinal injuries sustained in a riding accident. He and Jane left London to live at Upper Sheen House near Mortlake where she cared for him. He became worse in 1869 and they moved back to London. In London Jane was able to delegate the care of James at least in part to their daughters.

Jane was now more available to find her own interests. She took a great interest in schemes in London that were aimed at improving the lot of the poor. She supported the East London Nursing Association which since 1868 had supplied a network of District Nurses in east London. Each parish supplied funds and lodging for their nurse and matrons would ensure supervision.

Stuart-Wortley's husband died in 1881 and she died at Ripley House in Ripley, Surrey, on 4 February 1900, aged 79.

== Legacy ==
A memorial fund in her name was created in 1901 by her children that benefited a nursing charity.
