= Archibald Stuart-Wortley (painter) =

British painter

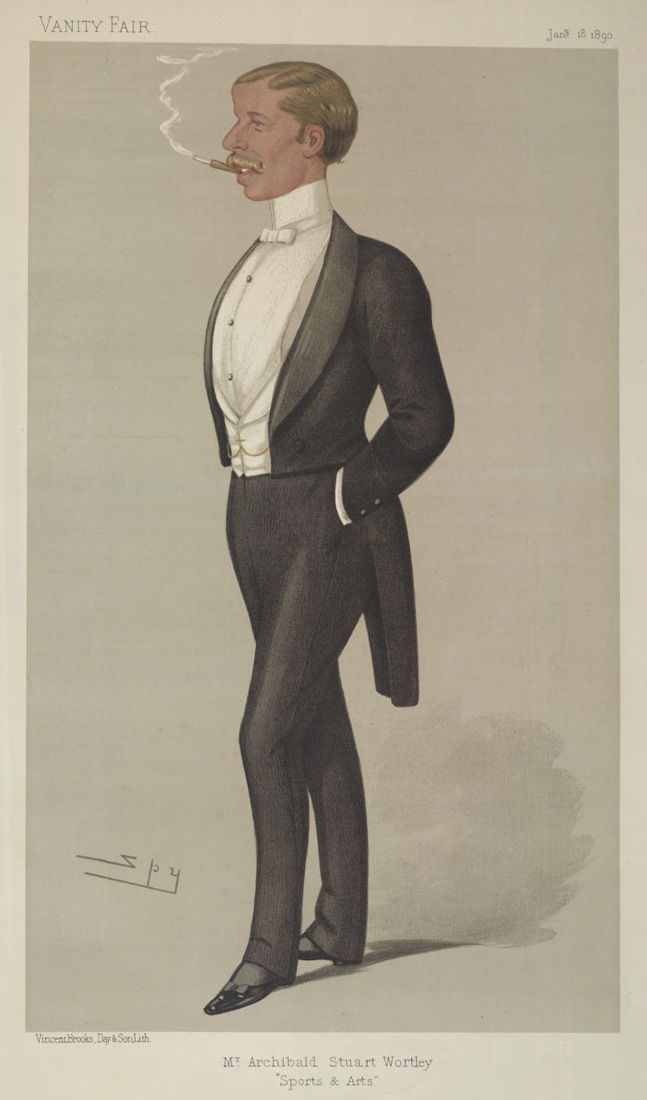
"Sports and Arts". Caricature by Spy published in Vanity Fair in 1890.

Archibald John Stuart-Wortley (27 May 1849 – 11 October 1905), was a British painter and illustrator.

== Life ==
Stuart-Wortley was the eldest son of the Hon. James Stuart-Wortley, youngest son of James Stuart-Wortley, 1st Baron Wharncliffe. His mother was the Hon. Jane Stuart-Wortley, daughter of Paul Thompson, 1st Baron Wenlock, while Lord Stuart of Wortley was his brother.

Primarily a portrait painter, in 1878 he commissioned the Arts and Crafts architect Edward William Godwin to design a house and studio for him in Tite Street, Chelsea, a fashionable area for artists at the time. Chelsea Lodge, as it was called, was located on Tite Street at the corner of Dilke Street and had two sets of principal rooms and studios enabling Stuart-Wortley to share it with Carlo Pellegrini, the well-known caricaturist. The arrangement does not seem to have worked out and he sold the house the following year. Stuart-Wortley then had another house built for him, Canwell House at no. 29 Tite Street, where he lived until 1885.

By 1881 the actress Nelly Bromley had moved in with him and the couple married in 1884, with Stuart-Wortley acting as father to her four children.

He died 11 October 1905 in Uxbridge, Middlesex. His estate was worth £3622.
