= John Henry Garstin =

British civil servant and administrator

John Henry Garstin CSI

Governor of Madras (acting)
- In office 1 December 1890 – 23 January 1891
- Governor-General: The Marquess of Lansdowne
- Preceded by: The Lord Connemara
- Succeeded by: The Lord Wenlock

Personal details
- Born: 1838
- Died: 15 April 1903 Lausanne, Switzerland

John Henry Garstin CSI (1838 – 15 April 1903) was a British civil servant and administrator who acted as the Governor of Madras from 1 December 1890 to 23 January 1891.

== Biography ==
Garstin was born in 1838, the son of General Edward Garstin. He was educated at Haileybury before entering the Madras Civil Service in 1857.

Garstin began his career as the Private Secretary to Francis Napier, 10th Lord Napier, then Governor of Madras and served from 27 March 1866 to 25 January 1870, when he was appointed to the Board of Revenue.

In 1878, he was made a Companion of the Star of India (CSI).

Garstin was nominated to the Madras Legislative Council and served from 9 January 1889 to 9 January 1894. When the tenure of Lord Connemara came to an end, Garstin acted as the Governor of Madras for a short period till the appointment of Beilby Lawley, 3rd Baron Wenlock.

== Personal life ==
In 1871, Garstin married Isabella Mary MacDonnell, daughter of General George Gordon MacDonell. They had five sons, Henry, John, Herbert, Charles and Arthur and one daughter, Marion.

== Works ==
- John Henry Garstin (1878). Manual of the South Arcot District. Lawrence Asylum Press.

Government offices
| Preceded by Robert Bourke, 1st Baron Connemara | Governor of Madras (acting); 1890-1891 | Succeeded by Beilby Lawley, 3rd Baron Wenlock |
