= East Sheen Lodge =

Coordinates: 51.4600°N 0.2693°W

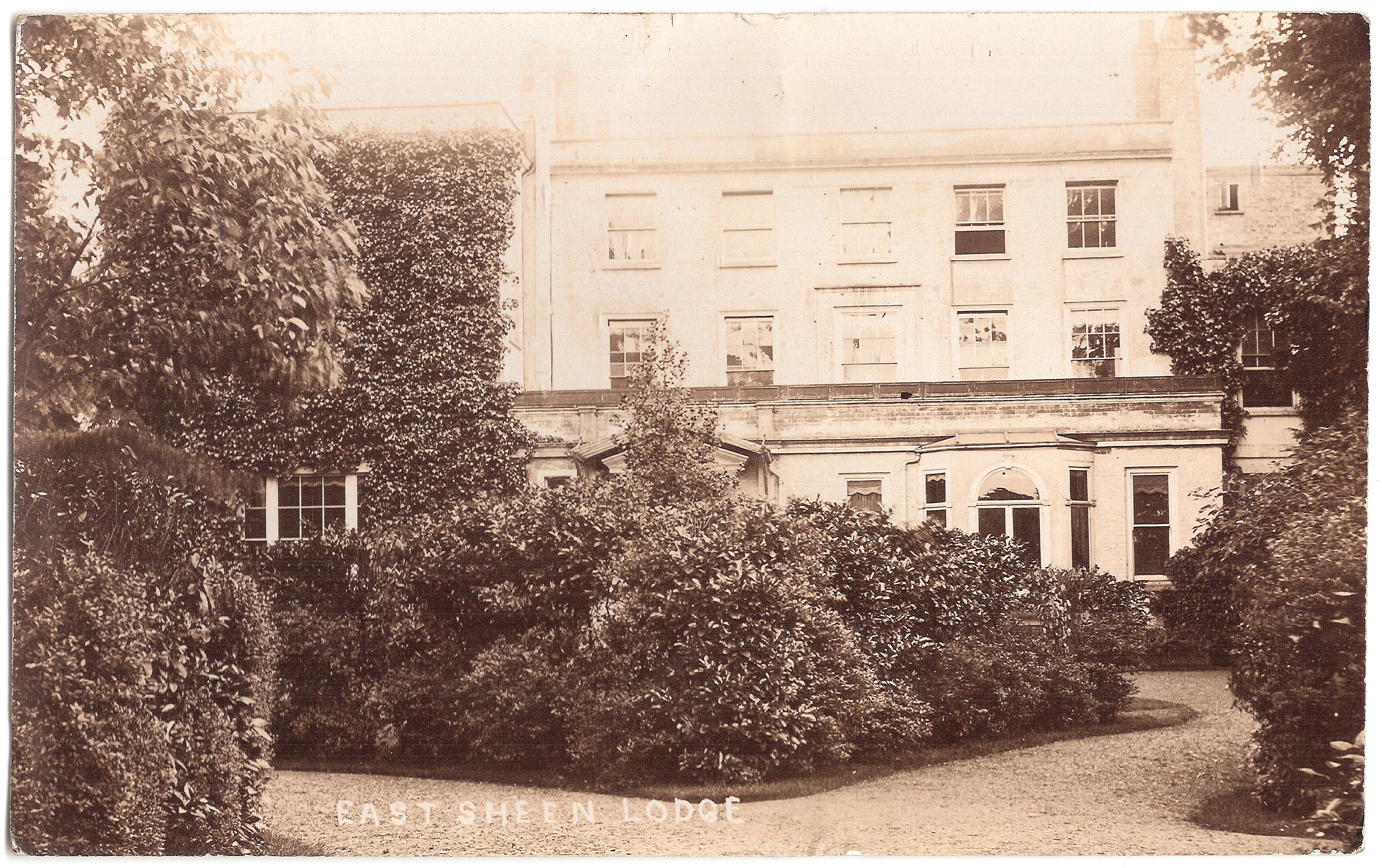
- Postcard of East Sheen Lodge

- Location in East Sheen, London

General information
- Status: Demolished
- Type: Lodge
- Location: East Sheen, London Borough of Richmond upon Thames, England
- Completed: c. 1720
- Demolished: 1965

East Sheen Lodge was an 18th-century house in East Sheen, London Borough of Richmond upon Thames, on the west side of Sheen Lane, with grounds extending to Richmond Park. It was built around 1720.

== History ==
The original house dates from the early 18th century (c. 1720). Its early notable residents included Sir John Barber, Lord Mayor of London in 1732 and later, in the mid‑19th century, Lord William FitzRoy, whose large household is recorded in the 1851 Census.

In 1858 the property was purchased by James Stuart‑Wortley, who paid £11,500 for the 16 acre estate. He renamed it "Wortley Lodge", and subsequently began to divide and develop parts of the surrounding land.

Later residents included the 1st Duke of Fife and his wife Princess Louise, Duchess of Fife (née Princess Louise of Wales, daughter of the then Prince of Wales) when they brought the property upon their marriage in 1889. During their residence, the couple's children, Princess Alexandra and Princess Maud, were born there. It was by that pond in the garden of East Sheen Lodge that Louise's brother the future King George V proposed to Queen Mary.

In 1908 the property was offered for sale, described in a detailed brochure. In 1912 it was acquired by Rear Admiral Horace Hood. He died aboard ship at the Battle of Jutland in 1916; his widow remained living at the Lodge until 1925.

East Sheen Lodge was the last of the grand houses in East Sheen to be demolished. It survived until 1965, though it had been converted into apartments in 1925.

== Architecture and grounds ==
A detailed 1908 brochure provides an extensive description of East Sheen Lodge, highlighting it as a luxurious suburban residence occupying nearly twelve and a half acres near Richmond Park. The house featured a grand reception hall, multiple drawing rooms, a library, a winter garden, conservatory, and sixteen bedrooms. Service facilities included stabling for eight horses with accommodation for grooms, a coach house, and a farmery.

The grounds were extensive, comprising lawns for tennis and croquet, a covered tennis court, flower gardens, a rosary, fruit and vegetable gardens, an orchard, and ornamental parkland, complemented by a terrace, tea house, and fountain. Approached by a carriage drive with ornamental gates, the property was equipped with modern utilities such as electricity, gas, and running water, and incorporated careful attention to sanitary arrangements.

== Legacy ==
The history of East Sheen Lodge illustrates the transition of East Sheen from rural estate‑land with large lodges and country houses, to the suburban‑residential area it is today. After subdivision and development by owners such as James Stuart‑Wortley, many of the large estates and grounds were broken up and by the mid‑20th century, most of the grand houses had been demolished.

Some visual and artistic records of East Sheen Lodge survive for instance a 1926 drawing in the collection of the Orleans House Gallery shows a view of the lodge and its grounds.
