= Robert Bourke, 1st Baron Connemara =

Irish Conservative politician and colonial administrator (1827–1902)

The Right Honourable The Lord Connemara GCIE PC
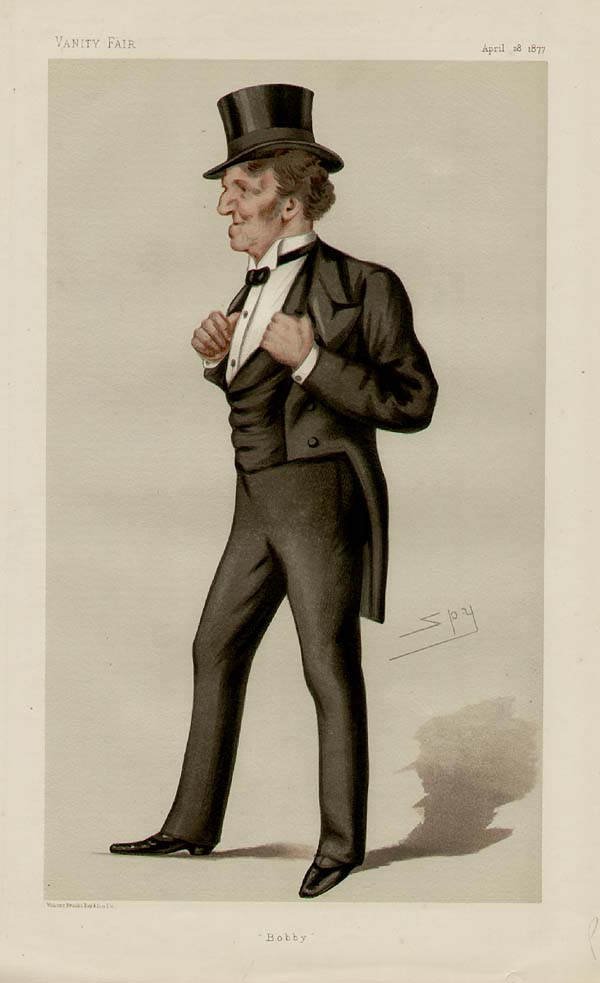
- "Bobby". Caricature in Vanity Fair, 1877.

Governor of Madras Presidency
- In office 8 December 1886 – December 1890
- Monarch: Victoria
- Preceded by: M. E. Grant Duff
- Succeeded by: John Henry Garstin

Under-Secretary of State for Foreign Affairs
- In office 23 February 1874 – 21 April 1880
- Monarch: Victoria
- Prime Minister: Benjamin Disraeli
- Preceded by: Viscount Enfield
- Succeeded by: Sir Charles Dilke
- In office 25 June 1885 – 28 January 1886
- Prime Minister: The Marquess of Salisbury
- Preceded by: Lord Edmond Fitzmaurice
- Succeeded by: James Bryce
Parliamentary Offices
Member of the House of Lords
Lord Temporal
Hereditary Peerage; 10 May 1887 – 3 September 1902
Preceded by	New Creation
Succeeded by	Extinct
Member of Parliament for King's Lynn
In office 1868–1886 Serving with: Lord Stanley; Lord Claud Hamilton; Sir William ffolkes
Preceded by	Sir Thomas Buxton; Lord Stanley
Succeeded by	Weston Jarvis

Personal details
- Born: Robert Bourke; 11 June 1827 Hayes, County Meath, Ireland
- Died: 3 September 1902 (aged 75) London, England
- Party: Conservative
- Spouses: Lady Susan Ramsay (m. 1863; div. 1890); Gertrude (m. 1894; died 1898)
- Parents: Robert Bourke, 5th Earl of Mayo; Anne Charlotte Jocelyn
- Relatives: Richard Bourke, 6th Earl of Mayo (brother)
- Education: Trinity College, Dublin

Robert Bourke, 1st Baron Connemara, (English: /bɜːrk/; BURK; /kɒnɛmɑːræ/; CONEH-mar-a; 11 June 1827 – 3 September 1902) was an Anglo-Irish Conservative politician and colonial administrator who served as Under-Secretary of State for Foreign Affairs (1874–80, 1885–86), Governor of Madras (1886–90) and District Grand Master of District Grand Lodge of Madras (1888-1890).

== Background and education ==
Bourke was born into an Anglo-Irish aristocratic family at Hayes, County Meath, Ireland, the third son of Robert Bourke, 5th Earl of Mayo (the son of Hon. Richard Burke, Bishop of Waterford and Lismore), and Anne Charlotte, daughter of The Hon. John Jocelyn. His older brother was The 6th Earl of Mayo, a Viceroy of India. He was educated at Hall Place School, Bexley, Kent, and Trinity College, Dublin, and was called to the Bar, Inner Temple, in 1852.

== Political career ==
Bourke practised as a barrister for a number of years before being elected Conservative Member of Parliament for King's Lynn in 1868. In 1874 he became Under-Secretary of State for Foreign Affairs in Benjamin Disraeli's second administration, a post he held until 1880, when he was also sworn of the Privy Council. He held the same post from 1885 to 1886 in Lord Salisbury's first administration.

== Governor of Madras ==
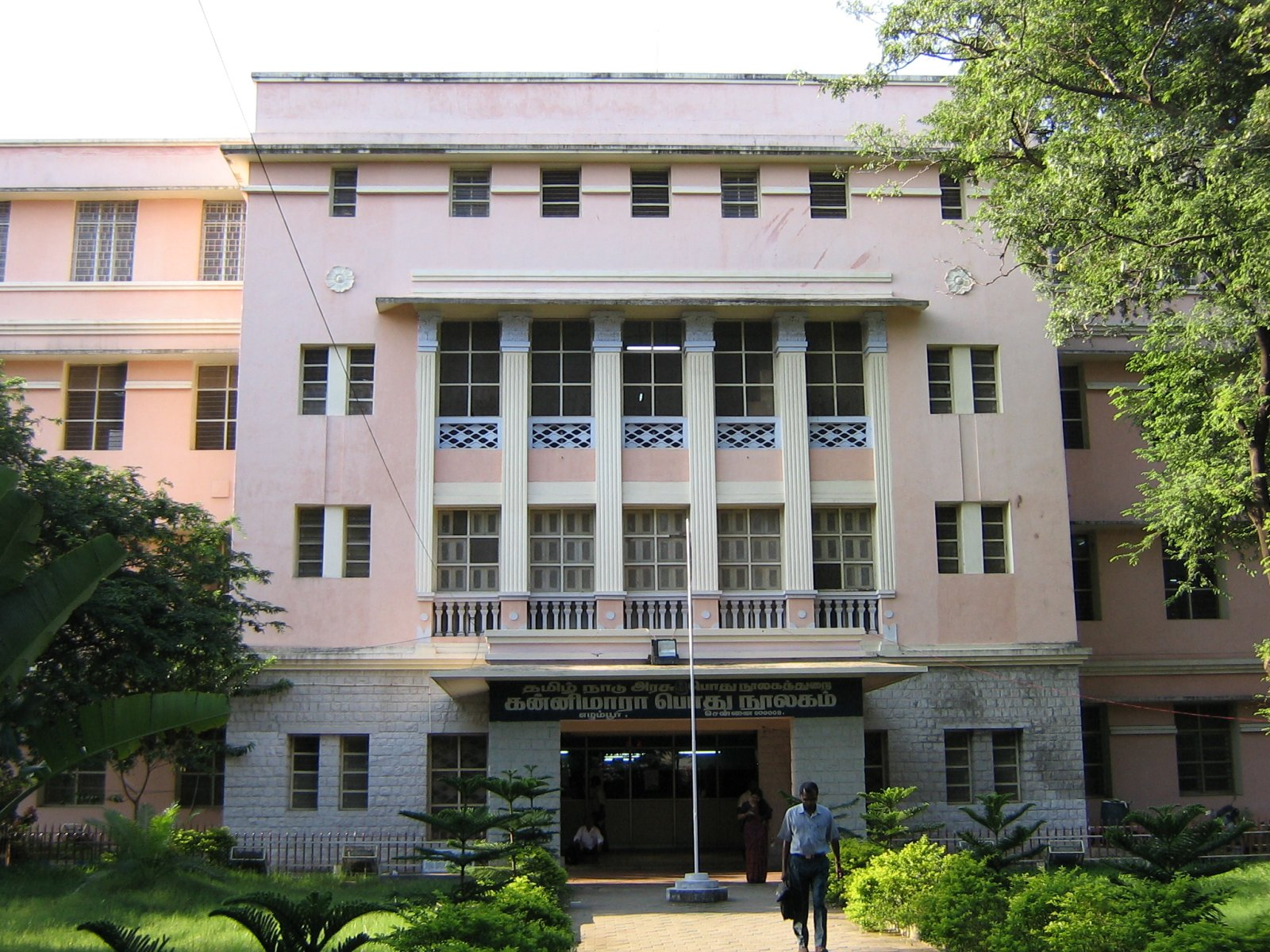
Connemara Library in Chennai

In 1886, Bourke was appointed Governor of Madras. The following year he was appointed a Knight Grand Commander of the Order of the Indian Empire and raised to the peerage as Baron Connemara, of Connemara in the County of Galway. In 1890 he laid the foundations stone of the Connemara Public Library in Madras, which was named after him and opened six years later. The building was originally planned to house the proposed Victoria Technical Institute which was constructed in 1887, the Golden Jubilee year of Queen Victoria's reign. The third session of the Indian National Congress was held at Madras in 1887 when Lord Connemara was the governor. He hosted a garden party at Government House for the delegates. The construction of the Madras High Court was commenced in 1889.

Lord Connemara is credited with introducing a number of reforms while serving as governor. He personally supervised the famine-relief measures at Ganjam and reorganised the sanitary administration of Madras city. He also improved and extended the east coast railway line connecting Madras with Calcutta. The Madras Mail, in its 4 December 1890 issue, comments that his administration was "a bright epoch in the annals of Madras". He resigned as governor on 8 November 1890 and returned to Great Britain when his wife sued him for infecting her with syphilis and his adultery with her lady's maid. He did not defend himself and accepted the verdict and paid costs.

== Later life ==
Lord Connemara contributed occasionally in the House of Lords, mostly on matters dealing with foreign affairs, making his last speech in June 1898. He also published the work Parliamentary Precedents.

== Family ==
Lord Connemara was twice married. He married firstly Lady Susan Georgiana, daughter of The 1st Marquess of Dalhousie, a former Governor-General of India, in 1863. They divorced in 1890. In 1894, he married Gertrude, former wife of Edward Coleman. Both marriages were childless. His second wife died in November 1898. Lord Connemara died in London in September 1902, aged 75, and was buried in the city's Kensal Green Cemetery. His barony became extinct at his death.

== Honours and Arms ==
=== Honours ===
Country	Date	Appointment	Ribbon	Post-nominals
United Kingdom	1880–1902	Privy Council (United Kingdom)		PC
United Kingdom	1887–1902	Knight of the Most Eminent Order of the Indian Empire		GCIE

=== Arms ===
Coat of arms of Robert Bourke, 1st Baron Connemara
Escutcheon Party per fess Or and Ermine, a cross gules the first quarter charged with a lion rampant sable and the second with a dexter hand couped at the wrist and erect gules Orders Order of the Indian Empire

== Ancestry ==
Ancestors of Robert Bourke, 1st Baron Connemara

8. Joseph Bourke, 3rd Earl of Mayo
4. Hon. Richard Bourke
9. Elizabeth Meade
2. Robert Bourke, 5th Earl of Mayo
5. Frances Fowler
1. Robert Bourke, 1st Baron Connemara
12. Robert Jocelyn, 1st Earl of Roden
6. Hon. John Jocelyn
13. Lady Anne Hamilton
3. Anne Charlotte Jocelyn
14. Richard FitzGerald
7. Margaret FitzGerald

== Gallery ==
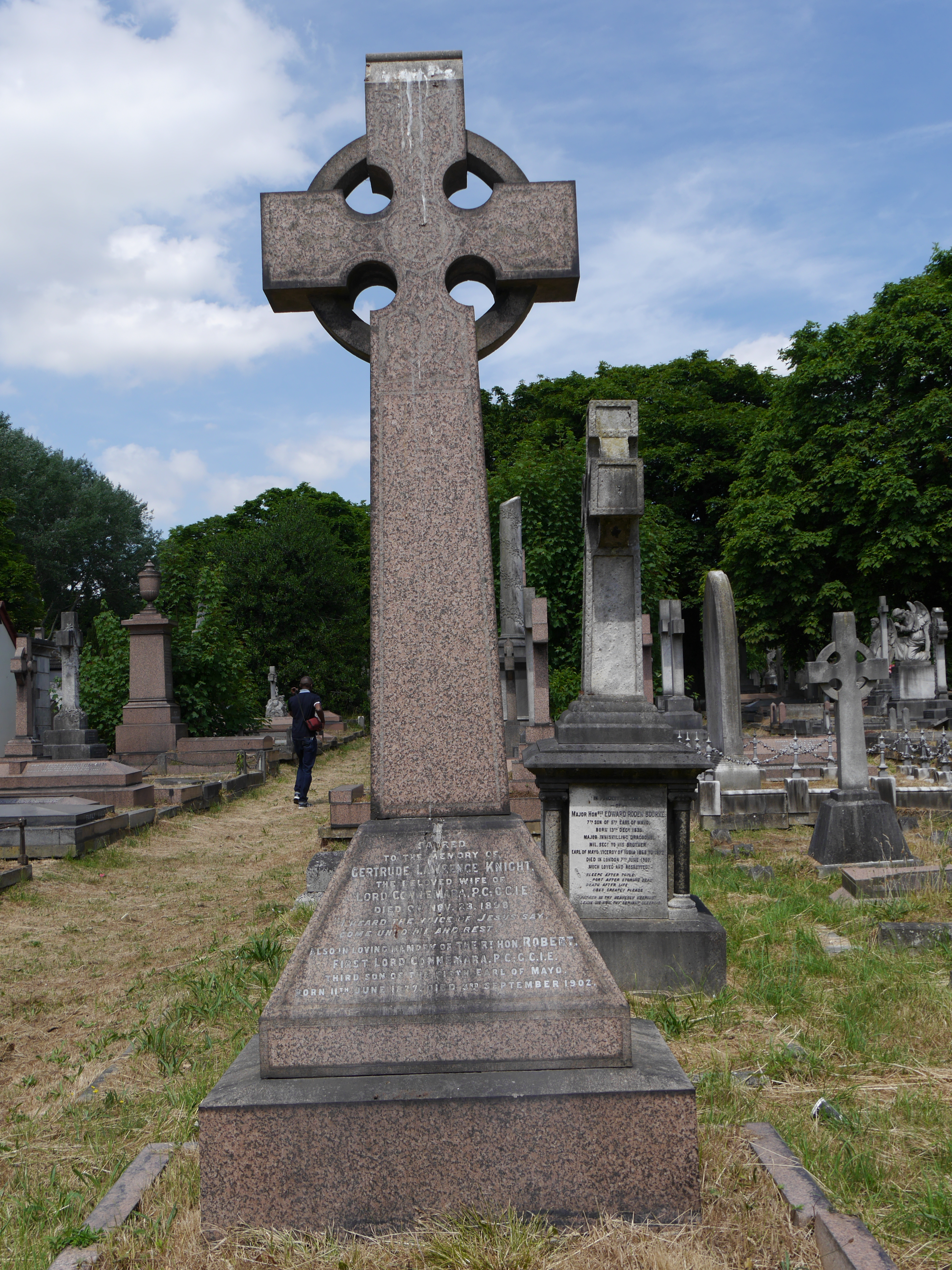
Monument, Kensal Green Cemetery

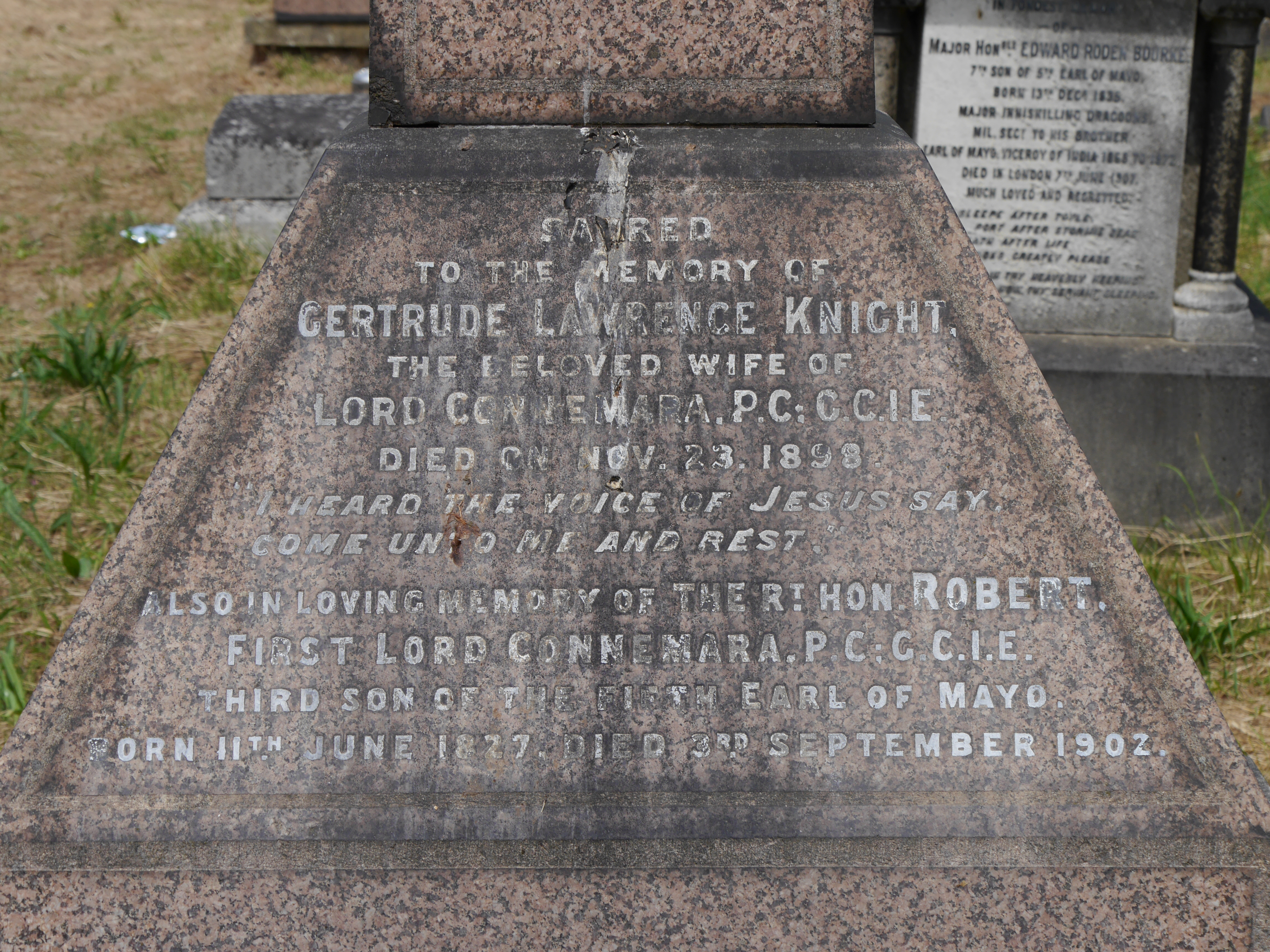
Monumental inscription detail, Kensal Green Cemetery

== See also ==
- House of Burgh, an Anglo-Norman and Hiberno-Norman dynasty founded in 1193

Parliament of the United Kingdom
Preceded by Sir Thomas Buxton; Lord Stanley	Member of Parliament for King's Lynn; 1868–1886; With: Lord Stanley 1868–1869; Lord Claud Hamilton 1869–1880; Sir William ffolkes 1880–1885 (representation reduced to one member 1885)	Succeeded by Weston Jarvis
Political offices
Preceded by Viscount Enfield	Under-Secretary of State for Foreign Affairs; 1874–1880	Succeeded by Sir Charles Dilke
Preceded by Lord Edmond Fitzmaurice	Under-Secretary of State for Foreign Affairs; 1885–1886	Succeeded by James Bryce
Government offices
Preceded by M. E. Grant Duff	Governor of Madras; 1886–1890	Succeeded by John Henry Garstin
Peerage of the United Kingdom
New creation	Baron Connemara; 1887–1902	Extinct
