= Sir Francis Lawley, 7th Baronet =

British politician (1782–1851)

Sir Francis Lawley, 7th Baronet (baptised 13 September 1782 – 30 January 1851), was a British politician.

== Early life ==
Lawley was the third son of Sir Robert Lawley, 5th Baronet, of Canwell Priory, Staffordshire. His mother was Jane Thompson (1743 – 9 November 1816), sister of Beilby Thompson, of Escrick, Yorkshire, on 11 August 1764. He was educated at Rugby School, starting in 1792, later matriculating to Christ Church, Oxford, in 1800. He became a fellow of All Souls College, Oxford, in 1803, resigning his fellowship on his marriage in 1815.

Lawley served in the Warwickshire Regiment of Yeomanry Cavalry, starting as a cornet in 1803, reaching the rank of lieutenant colonel in 1845 and resigning in 1848.

In the year of his marriage, his sister Jane, Lady Middleton—wife of Henry Willoughby, 6th Baron Middleton—made Middleton Hall, near Tamworth on the Staffordshire-Warwickshire border, available to him, where he lived for the rest of his life. He inherited a town house in Grosvenor Square and £200,000 on the death of his maternal uncle Richard Thompson in September 1820.

== Political career ==
Lawley was elected to Parliament for Warwickshire at a by-election in November 1820, holding the seat until he retired in 1832. His father had previously represented the county from 1780 to 1793. He declined an invitation to stand for Tamworth in 1847.

He succeeded his older brother, Robert Lawley, 1st Baron Wenlock, as 7th Baronet on 10 April 1834. His brother's barony became extinct. On Lawley's death in 1851, he was succeeded in the baronetcy by his younger brother, Paul Thompson, who had been created Baron Wenlock in 1839.

He was made a trustee of Rugby School in 1826.

He served as High Sheriff of Warwickshire in 1839.

== Personal life and death ==
Lawley married Mary Anne, daughter of George Talbot of Temple Guiting, Gloucestershire, on 18 May 1815. They had no children. Lawley died on 30 January 1851, aged 68.

== Notes ==
Parliament of the United Kingdom
Preceded by Dugdale Stratford Dugdale; Sir Charles Mordaunt, Bt	Member of Parliament for Warwickshire; 1820–1832; With: Dugdale Stratford Dugdale 1820–1831; Sir Grey Skipwith, Bt 1831–1832	Constituency abolished
Honorary titles
Preceded by Samuel Jones-Loyd	High Sheriff of Warwickshire; 1839	Succeeded by Dempster Heming
Baronetage of England
Preceded by Robert Lawley	Baronet of Spoonhill; 1834–1851	Succeeded by Paul Thompson
