= Beilby Lawley, 3rd Baron Wenlock =

British soldier, Liberal politician and colonial administrator (1849-1912)

The Right Honourable The Lord Wenlock GCSI GCIE KCB VD PC
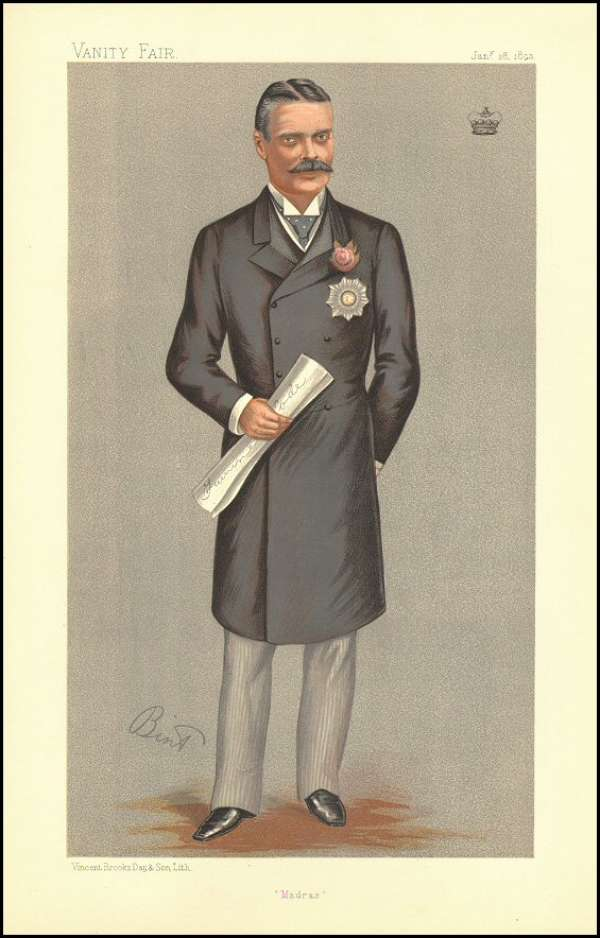

Governor of Madras
- In office 23 January 1891 – 18 March 1896
- Governors-General: The Marquess of Lansdowne; The Earl of Elgin
- Preceded by: John Henry Garstin (acting)
- Succeeded by: Sir Arthur Elibank Havelock

Member of Parliament for Chester
- In office 1880–1880
- Monarch: Queen Victoria
- Preceded by: John George Dodson
- Succeeded by: Constituency abolished

Personal details
- Born: 12 May 1849 London, England
- Died: 15 January 1912 (aged 62) Portland Place, London, England
- Party: Conservative Party
- Spouse: Constance Mary Lascelles (m. 1872)
- Parents: Beilby Lawley (father); Lady Elizabeth Grosvenor (mother)
- Relatives: Richard Lawley (brother); Arthur Lawley (brother)
- Education: Eton College
- Alma mater: Trinity College, Cambridge

Beilby Lawley, 3rd Baron Wenlock GCSI GCIE KCB VD PC (12 May 1849 – 15 January 1912) was a British soldier, Liberal politician and colonial administrator who was the Governor of Madras from 1891 to 1896.

== Early life ==
Lawley was the son of Beilby Lawley, 2nd Baron Wenlock and his wife Lady Elizabeth Grosvenor, daughter of Richard Grosvenor, 2nd Marquess of Westminster. He was educated at Eton College and at Trinity College, Cambridge. He was commissioned into the Yorkshire Hussars in 1869, and rose to the rank of Captain.

== Political career ==
Wenlock was active in local affairs as a Justice of the Peace for the East and North Ridings of Yorkshire and as Chairman of East Riding County Council. At the 1880 general election he was elected Member of Parliament for Chester but inherited his peerage later in the year and was elevated to the House of Lords.

== Governor of Madras ==
In 1890, Lawley was appointed Governor of Madras by the Conservative Party which came to power in the United Kingdom. Beilby Lawley served as the governor of Madras from 23 January 1891 to 18 March 1896. Lawley laid the foundation stone for the Nilgiri Mountain Railway which was begun in August 1891 when he was governor. During 1891–92, the northern districts of Madras Presidency were gripped by a terrible famine. The government's persistence in continuing grain export from the districts of Ganjam and Viazgapatm made the situation even worse. Lawley established the Board of Mohammedan Education in 1893. In 1895, Lawley laid the foundation stone for a solar observatory at Kodaikanal. The Wenlock Ward of General Hospital, Madras was established in his memory. During his tenure Madras government acquired an hospital in Mangalore and renamed as Wenlock District Hospital.

Lawley made significant enlargements to the Government House (now Raj Bhavan), Madras. Lawley also laid the foundation stone of the Madras High Court.

== Later life ==
In 1901 Wenlock was appointed a Privy Counsellor and made a Lord of the Bedchamber to the new Prince of Wales (later George V). He was elected chairman of the East Riding of Yorkshire County Council in January 1902. Wenlock held the position of Vice Chamberlain to Queen Mary from 1910 until his death.

Lord Wenlock was appointed Lieutenant-Colonel of the East Riding of Yorkshire Yeomanry on 15 May 1902 and later became its Honorary Colonel. He also held the honorary colonelcies of several Volunteer units, including the 2nd East Riding Artillery Volunteers (from 30 March 1880) and its successors in the Territorial Force, the II Northumbrian Brigade, Royal Field Artillery, whose drill hall at Anlaby Road, Hull, was later named Wenlock Barracks.

== Family ==
In 1872 he married Lady Constance Mary Lascelles, daughter of the 4th Earl of Harewood, by whom he had one daughter: Hon. Irene Constance Lawley (b. 1889). She married Colin Forbes Adam of Skipwith, Yorkshire. The Forbes Adam family retain the Escrick estate which they now operate as a holiday and pleasure park.

He was succeeded in the Barony by his brother Richard.

== Honours and awards ==
Lord Wenlock received several British Orders and decorations:

- GCSI: Knight Grand Commander of the Order of the Star of India
- GCIE: Knight Grand Commander of the Order of the Indian Empire
- KCB: Knight Commander of the Order of the Bath (civil division) – 26 November 1901
- VD : Volunteer Officers' Decoration – 19 November 1901 – for his contribution as Honorary Colonel of the 2nd East Riding of Yorkshire Volunteer Artillery (Western Division, Royal Garrison Artillery)

Parliament of the United Kingdom
Preceded by Henry Cecil Raikes; John George Dodson	Member of Parliament for Chester; 1880; With: Henry Cecil Raikes	Vacant Suspension until 1885 Title next held by Balthazar Walter Foster
Military offices
Preceded by The Lord Herries of Terregles	Honorary Colonel of the East Riding of Yorkshire Yeomanry; 1908–1912	Succeeded by J.B. Stacey-Clitheroe
New title	Honorary Colonel of the 2nd East Riding Artillery Volunteers; 1881–1908	Vacant Renamed
New title	Honorary Colonel of the 2nd Northumbrian Brigade RFA; 1908–1912	Vacant Title next held by O. Sanderson
Government offices
Preceded by John Henry Garstin	Governor of Madras; 1891–1895	Succeeded by Sir Arthur Havelock
Peerage of the United Kingdom
Preceded by Beilby Richard Lawley	Baron Wenlock; 1880–1912	Succeeded by Richard Lawley
