= Sir Robert Lawley, 5th Baronet =

English landowner and politician

Sir Robert Lawley, 5th Baronet (c. 1736 – 11 March 1793) was an English landowner and politician who sat in the House of Commons from 1780 to 1793.

== Early life ==
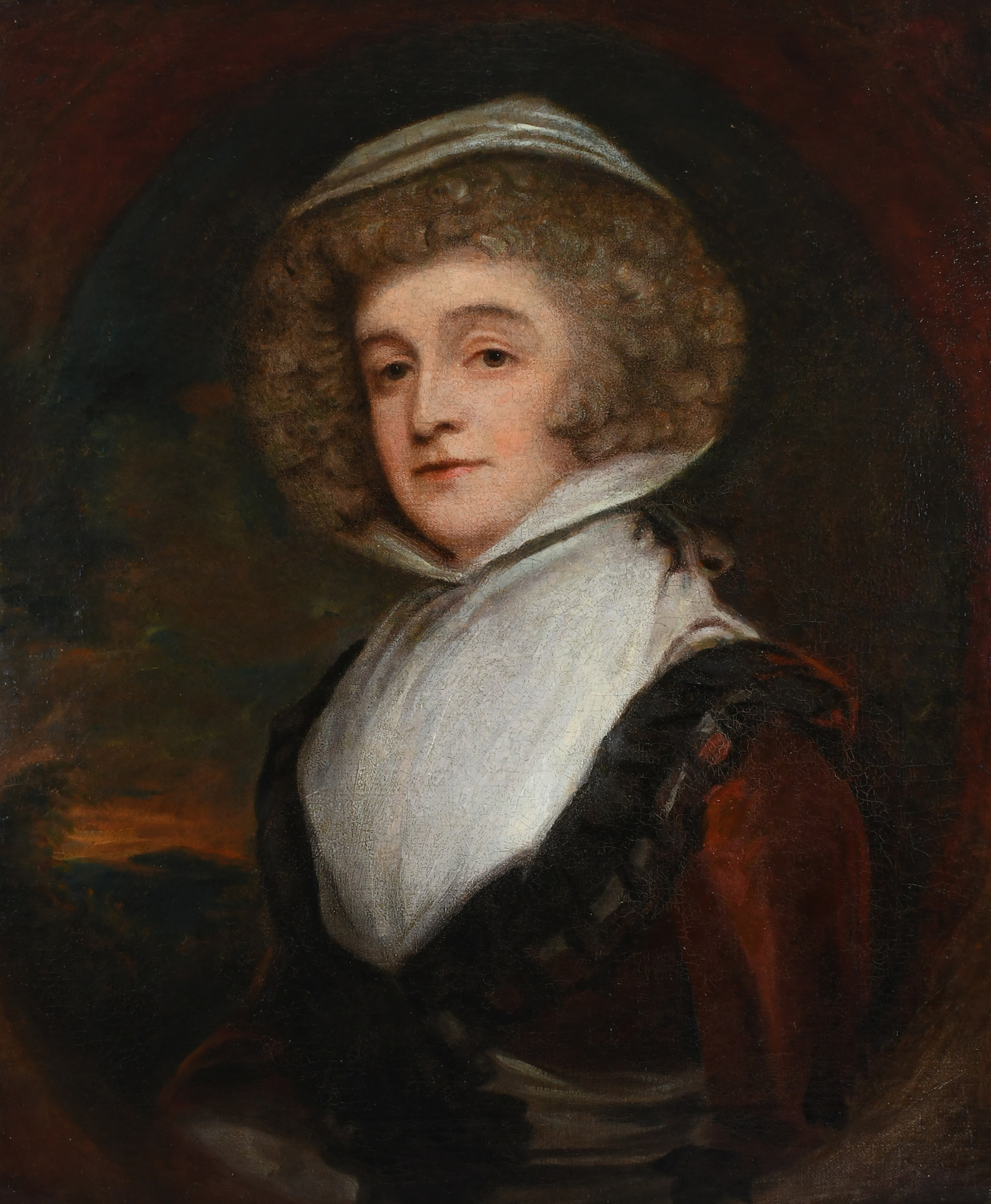
Portrait of a lady, possibly Lady Jane Lawley (1743–1816), painting by George Romney, c.1783.

Lawley was the only surviving son of Sir Robert Lawley, 4th Baronet, of Canwell Priory and his wife Elizabeth Blackwell, daughter of Sir Lambert Blackwell, 1st Baronet and was baptized on 22 March 1736. He was educated at Westminster School in 1748 and entered Emmanuel College, Cambridge in 1753. He married Jane Thompson (1743 – 9 November 1816), sister of Beilby Thompson, of Escrick, Yorkshire on 11 August 1764. The family seat was Canwell Hall, Canwell, Staffordshire a thirty-nine roomed mansion house built by Sir Francis, 2nd Baronet. He rebuilt the house in grand Georgian style to a design by architect James Wyatt.

== Political career ==
In the 1780 general election, Lawley was returned as Member of Parliament (MP) for Warwickshire, being the choice of the Whig manufacturing interests of Birmingham, which by this period could name one of two Warwickshire's two MPs without opposition. Despite this, he was not himself a Whig partisan but:

had given the most incontrovertible indications of a sincere zeal in their cause, was unanimously selected as the voluntary object of their unbiassed preference...and at the county meeting, held a short time afterwards, he was named and accepted without any opposition. He is not likely to prove a speaker in the House, but ... it is supposed that he has no superiors in integrity.

Lawley did not vote consistently with either party. In 1784 he was a member of the St. Alban's Tavern group which tried to bring Fox and Pitt together. His only two recorded speeches were on matters of constituency interest (on a bill to allow brass to be exported and supporting a petition of some iron manufacturers). He retained his seat until his death.

== Later years and legacy ==
Lawley died on 11 March 1793 and was succeeded in the baronetcy by his son Robert Lawley, 1st Baron Wenlock . He had eight children with Jane who were baptised at Holy Trinity Church, Sutton Coldfield. In addition to Robert his children included:

- Jane Lawley (c. 1767–1852), married on 21 August 1793 Henry Willoughby, 6th Baron Middleton
- Anne Lawley (d. 1790)
- Sir Francis Lawley, 7th Baronet (c. 1782–1851)
- Paul Beilby Lawley (1784–1852)

== See also ==
- Baron Wenlock

Parliament of Great Britain
Preceded by Thomas George Skipwith; Sir Charles Holte, Bt	Member for Warwickshire; 1780–1793; With: Sir George Shuckburgh, Bt	Succeeded by Sir George Shuckburgh, Bt; Sir John Mordaunt, Bt
Baronetage of England
Preceded by Robert Lawley	Baronet (of Spoonhill); 1779–1793	Succeeded by Robert Lawley
