= The Wenlock Arms =

Pub in Hoxton, London

Coordinates: 51.5314°N 0.0940°W

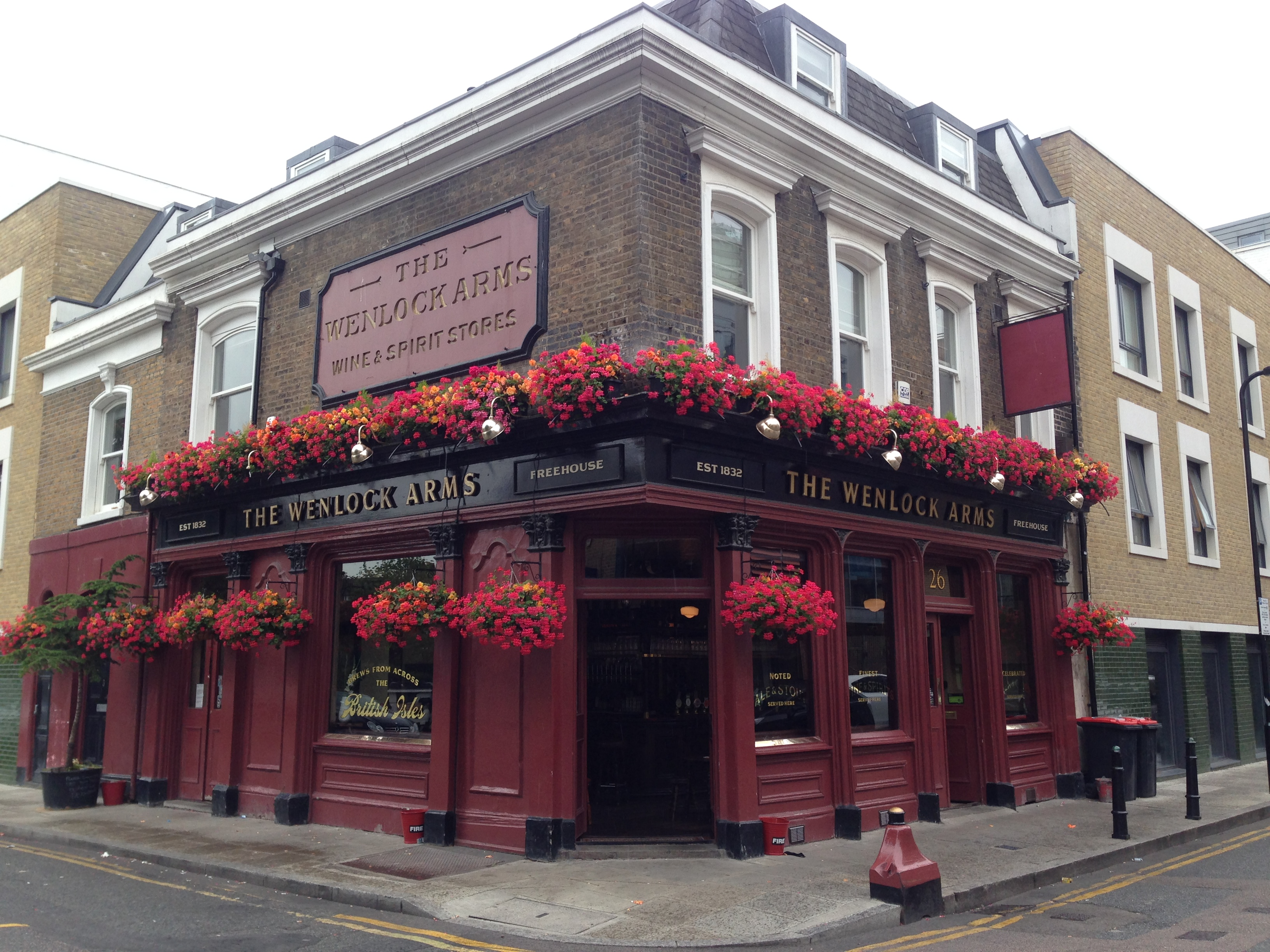
The Wenlock Arms as it is today

The Wenlock Arms is a public house in Hoxton, in East London which began trading in 1787. The pub is located halfway between Old Street and Angel, just off the City Road and the City Road Basin and Wenlock Basin on the Regent's Canal. The pub has won awards for the quality and range of its cask ales.

== History ==
The Wenlock Arms first opened for business in 1787 and was operated by the nearby Wenlock Brewery as a "brewery tap".

John Lane (1808–1873) owned and ran the Wenlock Brewery from 1840 until his death, initially as "Lane & Bowden" (the 1842 Post Office Directory mentions “LANE & BOWDEN, Ale Brewers, 9 Wenlock Road”). John's brother-in-law, John Mitchell (1813–1868), was brewery foreman in 1851 (mentioned in the census). Various other members of the Mitchell family worked at the brewery from time to time. These included John Mitchell's older brother Thomas (mentioned in the census as being foreman at the brewery in 1871), another John Mitchell (a cousin; c. 1820–1849), as well as at least three of John Lane's brothers. Yet another John Mitchell, John Hoffe Mitchell, was joint executor of John Lane's will.

In 1873, ownership passed to John Lane's youngest son, Robert George. Robert, after brewing in Alton, Hampshire, and marrying Parisienne Louise Marie Julienne Isabel Jean dit Saussay in 1876, died of pneumonia in 1880, aged only 31. After this the brewery became the property of one Richard Alfred Glover, before being taken over by Glover Bell & Co in 1887.

John Lane, his wife Eliza Beaven (Mitchell), four of their children – including Robert George and another son Frederick (who committed suicide by shooting himself in 1874) – are buried in Abney Park Cemetery. Buried next to them are members of the Mitchell family.

When the New London Brewery, of Lambeth, London, went into voluntary liquidation on 13 January 1925, their licensed houses were bought by the Wenlock Brewery.

Wenlock Fireside Ale was recreated starting from 1 November 1999 by the Museum Brewery, Burton, and was available throughout the year 2000.

== Building and interior ==
The pub building, built in 1835, is a survivor of the wartime bombing of the area, and retains a traditional pub interior.

== Cask ale ==
The Wenlock Arms is a renowned cask ale public house in London, and has been named North London Pub of the Year by the local CAMRA branch on four occasions since it reopened in 1994. The pub competes in the north category, despite its East End location, as CAMRA use postal districts to define their competition sectors.

== Cultural references ==
"Terror at Wenlock Brewery" was published in 1998 by Stephen Sadler, and tells of The Blitz.

David Beckham used to join his grandfather for drinks at the Wenlock Arms, even after he became a superstar.

The Wenlock Arms features in the opening titles of the television show Al Murray's Compete for the Meat.

The Wenlock Arms was used as a location for Edgar Wright and Simon Pegg's film The World's End, released in 2013 starring Simon Pegg, Nick Frost, Paddy Considine, Martin Freeman, Eddie Marsan, and Rosamund Pike.

== Conservation ==
In September 2010, news emerged that the Wenlock Arms was planned to be demolished, and in response a campaign to save the pub was started. On 7 September 2011, an application to demolish the existing building and replace it with a new development was registered with Hackney Council. The consultation period ran until 10 October 2011. There was also a new application (October 2012).

The Wenlock arms is now in a conservation area, and receives protection as a result. The decision to extend the Regents Canal Conservation Area was taken by Hackney Council (Cabinet) on 19 December 2011. After a period of closure, the pub was finally rescued after a vigorous campaign led by the local community and CAMRA. It reopened on 3 June 2013. The pub itself underwent renovation, floors upstairs being extended for residential accommodation.
