= John Watson (polo) =

Irish polo player

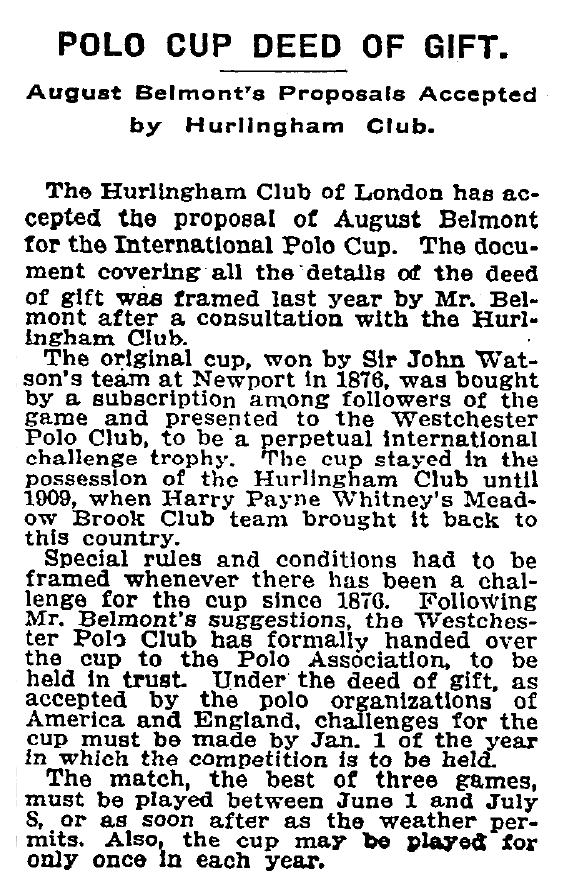
New York Times on June 30, 1912

Captain John Henry Watson was an Irish champion polo player. He won the International Polo Cup in Newport, Rhode Island in 1876 alongside Captain Thomas Hone, Malcolm Orme Little, and Captain the Hon. Richard Lawley, 4th Baron Wenlock.
