= Malcolm Orme Little =

British Army general (1857–1931)

Brigadier-General Malcolm Orme Little CB CBE DL
- Born: 29 November 1857; Paddington, Middlesex, England
- Died: 1 February 1931 (aged 73)
- Spouse: Iris Hermione Brassey
- Children: Malcolm Archibald Albert Little
- Relatives: General Sir Archibald Little, KCB (father)
- Military career
- Allegiance: British Crown
- Branch: British Army
- Service years: 1877–1917
- Rank: Brigadier-General
- Unit: 9th Queen's Royal Lancers
- Commands: 9th Queen's Royal Lancers; 3rd Cavalry Brigade; 2/1st Welsh Border Mounted Brigade
- Conflicts: Second Boer War; World War I

Brigadier-General Malcolm Orme Little, CB, CBE, DL (29 November 1857 – 1 February 1931) was a cavalry officer in the British Army and champion polo player. He commanded a cavalry brigade in the Second Boer War and a yeomanry brigade in the First World War.

== Early life ==
Malcolm Orme Little was born on 29 November 1857 at Sussex Square, Hyde Park Gardens, Paddington, Middlesex, England, he was the second son of General Sir Archibald Little, KCB and his wife Jane (née Orme).

== Career ==
On 19 January 1923, Little was commissioned as a Deputy Lieutenant for the County of Warwick. Little was appointed as a Commander of the Order of the British Empire (CBE) later.

=== Military career ===
He obtained his first commission as an infantry second-lieutenant in the Royal North Gloucester Militia (Note: The Royal North Gloucester became 4th Battalion of the Gloucestershire Regiment on 1 July 1881 and was disbanded on 31 July 1908.) on 26 September 1877. On 11 May 1878, he obtained a regular commission as a Second Lieutenant in the 17th Lancers after graduating from the Royal Military College. He had been an Honorary Queen's Cadet. On the same date, he resigned his Militia Commission. On 19 October 1878, he transferred to the 9th Queen's Royal Lancers, his father's regiment. On the same date, the 9th Lancers departed Sialkot, India to take part in the Second Anglo-Afghan War.

Little remained with the 9th Lancers for the rest of the century: he was promoted to lieutenant on 25 February 1880, to captain on 20 October 1886, to Major on 5 September 1894, and to lieutenant-colonel (and to command of the regiment) on 15 March 1900. By this time, the 9th Lancers were on active service in the Second Boer War. The regiment formed part of the 3rd Cavalry Brigade and took part in the battles of Modder River (28 November 1899) and Magersfontein (10-11 December 1899), Relief of Kimberley and Battle of Paardeberg. He was mentioned in despatches from Lord Methuen dated 15 February 1900 and Lord Roberts dated 31 March 1900. Little took over command of the brigade and was promoted to the local rank of brigadier-general in South Africa on 10 July 1900. (Note: 3rd Cavalry Brigade was one of just three cavalry brigades in the British Army in the Second Boer War.) He was awarded a Brevet Colonelcy on 29 November 1900 and his local rank was confirmed on 8 April 1902, (Note: At this point, he was a lieutenant-colonel, a brevet colonel and local brigadier-general.) when he took command of another brigade (possibly the Australian Brigade), which moved to Aberfeldy in the Orange River Colony. He was again mentioned in a despatch on 23 June 1902, this time by Lord Kitchener, who wrote that Little had "proved himself as a capable leader of mounted troops in the field." The war ended with the Peace of Vereeniging in late May 1902, and Little left Cape Town the following month arriving at Southampton in late July.

After four years in command of the 9th Lancers, and having served the normal period in command, Little was retired on half-pay – for the first time – on 15 March 1904. On 24 June 1904, as part of Edward VII's Birthday Honours, he was invested as a Companion of the Order of the Bath (CB). He was recalled to active service on 4 May 1905 as a Staff Officer for Imperial Yeomanry and was promoted to the substantive rank of colonel. He retired for the second time on 17 October 1908.

With the outbreak of the First World War, Colonel Little was once again recalled to active service. On 18 September 1914 he was temporarily appointed as an Inspector of Remounts. On 20 January 1915, he was appointed as brigade commander, of the second line yeomanry 2/1st Welsh Border Mounted Brigade under the command of the 63rd (2nd Northumbrian) Division in the Newcastle area of Northumberland. In April 1916, the brigade joined the 1st Mounted Division in East Anglia but by July it had left for the Morpeth, Northumberland area. (Note: Becke shows the 2/1st Welsh Border Mounted Brigade commander as Br-Gen M.D. Little, but this is probably a typo.) At this time he was promoted to the temporary rank of brigadier-general. On 13 June 1917 he relinquished his command, and retired for the third and final time and was granted the honorary rank of brigadier-general in August 1917.

=== Polo ===
Little won the International Polo Cup in 1886 for Britain alongside John Henry Watson, Captain Thomas Hone, and Captain the Hon. Richard Lawley, 4th Baron Wenlock.

== Personal life ==
On 7 July 1903 at St George's, Hanover Square, in Westminster, London, Little was married to Iris Hermione Brassey (1879/80–1970), the daughter of Albert Brassey and the Hon. Matilda Maria Helena Bingham (a daughter of the 4th Baron Clanmorris). Together, they were the parents of:

- Malcolm Archibald Albert Little (1904–1944), who was a Colonel in the 9th Lancers and a polo player.
- Ian Little (1918–2012), who was a leading economist.

Little died on 1 February 1931 at his home, Dunsmore, at Rugby, Warwickshire. His widow died on 6 August 1970.

== Bibliography ==
- Becke, Archibald F. (1936). Order of Battle of Divisions Part 2A. The Territorial Force Mounted Divisions and the 1st-Line Territorial Force Divisions (42–56). London: HMSO. OCLC 4405016.
- Becke, Archibald F. (1937). Order of Battle of Divisions Part 2B. The 2nd-Line Territorial Force Divisions (57th–69th) with The Home-Service Divisions (71st–73rd) and 74th and 75th Divisions. London: HMSO. OCLC 4405016.
- Clarke, W.G. (1993). Horse Gunners: The Royal Horse Artillery, 200 Years of Panache and Professionalism. Woolwich: The Royal Artillery Institution. ISBN 09520762-0-9.
- Frederick, J.B.M. (1984). Lineage Book of British Land Forces 1660–1978. Wakefield, Yorkshire: Microform Academic Publishers. ISBN 1-85117-009-X.
- Hanwell, Major W. (1949). A Short History of the 9th Queen's Royal Lancers, 1715-1949. Aldershot: Gale & Polden.
- James, Brigadier E.A. (1978). British Regiments 1914–18. London: Samson Books Limited. ISBN 0-906304-03-2.
