= Beilby Lawley, 2nd Baron Wenlock =

English nobleman (1818-1880)

Beilby Richard Lawley 2nd Baron Wenlock
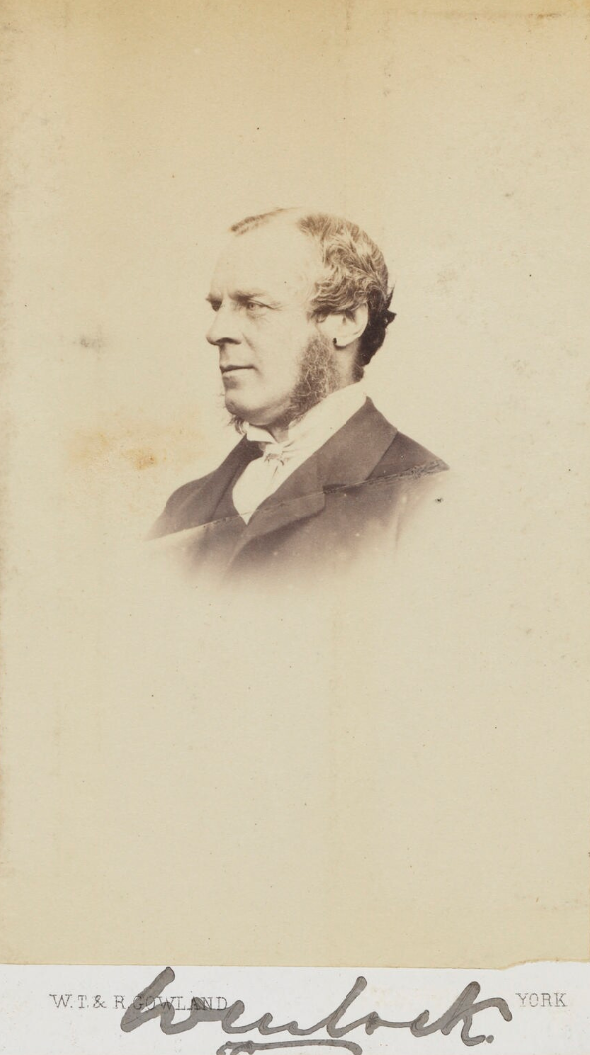
- Carte-de-visite by W.T. & R. Gowland

Member of Parliament for Pontefract
- In office 1851–1852
- Preceded by: Richard Monckton Milnes; Samuel Martin
- Succeeded by: Richard Monckton Milnes; Benjamin Oliveira

Personal details
- Born: 2 April 1818 Escrick, Yorkshire, England
- Died: 6 November 1880 (aged 62)
- Spouse: Lady Elizabeth Grosvenor
- Children: 8
- Parents: Paul Thompson (father); Caroline Neville (mother)
- Relatives: Francis Charles Lawley (brother); Jane Lawley (sister); Richard Lawley (son); Algernon Lawley (son); Arthur Lawley (son); Beilby Lawley (son)
- Military career
- Allegiance: United Kingdom
- Branch: British Army
- Rank: Colonel
- Unit: Yorkshire Hussars

Beilby Richard Lawley, 2nd Baron Wenlock (2 April 1818 – 6 November 1880) was an English nobleman, eldest son of Paul Thompson, 1st Baron Wenlock and 8th Baronet. He succeeded as 2nd Baron and 9th Baronet and to the family estate at Escrick, Yorkshire on the death of his father in 1852.

He served in the Yorkshire Hussars latterly as Colonel, was Member of Parliament for Pontefract 1851–1852 and was Lord Lieutenant of the East Riding of Yorkshire 1864–1880.

He married Lady Elizabeth Grosvenor, daughter of Richard Grosvenor, 2nd Marquess of Westminster, and had eight children, including four sons who each in turn succeeded to the titles. Among his children were:

- Hon. Caroline Elizabeth Lawley (1848 – 13 July 1934), married Lt.-Col. Caryl Molyneaux (d. 1912), son of Charles Molyneux, 3rd Earl of Sefton and had issue
- Hon. Alethea Jane Lawley (1851 1929), historian, married the Italian musicologist and composer Taddeo Wiel (1849–1920)
- Beilby Lawley, 3rd Baron Wenlock (1849–1912)
- Hon. Constance Mary Lawley (1854 – 4 May 1951), married first on 19 June 1877 Captain Eustace Vesey (d. 1886), son of Thomas Vesey, 3rd Viscount de Vesci and had issue, married second on 7 July 1892 Edward Portman (d. 1911), son of Henry Portman, 2nd Viscount Portman
- Richard Lawley, 4th Baron Wenlock (1856–1918)
- Rev. Algernon Lawley, 5th Baron Wenlock (1857–1931)
- Arthur Lawley, 6th Baron Wenlock (1860–1932)

He was succeeded by his eldest son Beilby.

Parliament of the United Kingdom
Preceded by Richard Monckton Milnes; Samuel Martin	Member of Parliament for Pontefract; 1851–1852; With: Richard Monckton Milnes	Succeeded by Richard Monckton Milnes; Benjamin Oliveira
Honorary titles
Preceded by The Earl of Carlisle	Lord Lieutenant of the East Riding of Yorkshire; 1864–1880	Succeeded by The Lord Herries of Terregles
Peerage of the United Kingdom
Preceded by Paul Thompson	Baron Wenlock; 1852–1880	Succeeded by Beilby Thompson
