= Malcolm Archibald Albert Little =

Colonel Malcolm Archibald Albert Little (5 June 1904 – 5 October 1944) was a British soldier in the 9th Lancers and polo player.

== Biography ==
Little was born in Heythrop, Oxfordshire to Brigadier-General Malcolm Orme Little and Iris Hermione Brassey.

He was killed in action in Cesena, Italy on 5 October 1944 in World War II.
