= Ian Little (economist) =

English economist (1918–2012)

- Born: 18 December 1918
- Died: 13 July 2012 (aged 93)
- Citizenship: British
- Spouse(s): Doreen Hennessey (m. 1946; died 1984) Lydia Segrave (m. 1991)
- Children: 2

Academic background
- Thesis: The theory of welfare economics (1949)

Academic work
- Notable students: Manmohan Singh

Ian Malcolm David Little, CBE, AFC, FBA (18 December 1918 – 13 July 2012) was a British economist.

== Early life ==
The son of Brigadier-General Malcolm Orme Little and his wife Iris Hermione, née Brassey.

Little was educated at Eton and New College, Oxford, where he read PPE, graduating with a First in 1947. During World War II, he served as a test pilot in the Airborne Forces Experimental Establishment and flew autogiros, and was awarded the Air Force Cross. After the War, he began a DPhil at Nuffield College, Oxford under the supervision of John Hicks, with whom he clashed. Hicks threatened to have Little's studentship rescinded, but Little was elected a prize fellow of All Souls College, Oxford in 1948, where he completed his doctorate.

== Career ==
Little's doctoral thesis was published by Oxford University Press in 1950 as A Critique of Welfare Economics and proved to be influential, selling 70,000 copies. He was elected a fellow of Trinity College, Oxford in 1950 and an official fellow of Nuffield College in 1952. Between 1953 and 1955 he was seconded to HM Treasury as the deputy director of the Economic Section. He was Professor of Economics of Underdeveloped Countries at Oxford between 1971 and 1976.

In the 1970s, Little criticised the then-dominant protectionist approach to developmental economics, and advocated for trade liberalization by developing countries, an approach which would later prove to be influential. Among his students was former Prime Minister of India Dr Manmohan Singh who, as India's Finance Minister, adopted many of the policies advocated by Little.

Little was elected to the British Academy in 1973 and appointed a CBE in 1997.

== Personal life ==
In 1946 Little married Doreen Hennessey and had a son and daughter. Doreen died in 1984 and in 1991 he married, secondly, Lydia Segrave. In 2015 Lydia Segrave married Edward Baldwin, 4th Earl Baldwin of Bewdley.
