= Arthur Lawley, 6th Baron Wenlock =

British soldier, peer, colonial governor (1860–1932)

The Right Honourable The Lord Wenlock GCSI GCIE KCMG
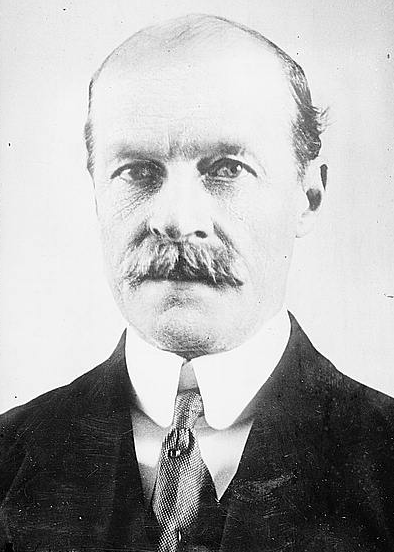

Governor of Madras
- In office 28 March 1906 – 3 November 1911
- Governors-General: The Earl of Minto; The Lord Hardinge
- Preceded by: Sir Gabriel Stokes (acting)
- Succeeded by: The Lord Carmichael

Lieutenant-Governor of the Transvaal
- In office 29 September 1902 – 4 December 1905
- Governor: The Viscount Milner; The Earl of Selborne
- Preceded by: Position established
- Succeeded by: Sir Richard Solomon

Governor of Western Australia
- In office 1 May 1901 – 14 August 1902
- Premier: George Throssell; George Leake; Alf Morgans; Walter James
- Preceded by: Sir Gerard Smith
- Succeeded by: Sir Frederick Bedford

Administrator of Matabeleland
- In office 5 December 1896 – 24 January 1901
- Preceded by: Position established
- Succeeded by: William Henry Milton (as Administrator of Southern Rhodesia)

Personal details
- Born: 12 November 1860 London, England
- Died: 14 June 1932 (aged 71) Freiberg, Germany
- Spouse(s): Annie Allen Cunard; (3 children)
- Parent: Beilby Lawley, 2nd Baron Wenlock (father)
- Relatives: Beilby Lawley (brother)

Arthur Lawley, 6th Baron Wenlock, GCSI, GCIE, KCMG (12 November 1860 – 14 June 1932) was a British colonial administrator who served variously as Administrator of Matabeleland, Governor of Western Australia, Lieutenant-Governor of the Transvaal, and Governor of Madras. The fourth and youngest son of the 2nd Baron Wenlock, he attended Eton College and Trinity College, Cambridge, before joining the military. Serving in the Mahdist War, he reached the rank of captain before resigning his commission to pursue other interests. Lawley was then private secretary to his uncle, the 1st Duke of Westminster, and subsequently to the 4th Earl Grey, who he followed to Rhodesia.

Representing the British South Africa Company, Lawley was Administrator of Matabeleland from 1896 to 1901, during the conclusion of the Second Matabele War. He was then Governor of Western Australia for a brief period, from 1901 to 1902, before returning to Africa to serve as Lieutenant-Governor of the Transvaal (under Viscount Milner, the governor). The Transvaal had been incorporated into the empire following the Second Boer War, and Lawley bore much of the responsibility for administrating the colony, remaining lieutenant-governor until 1905. The following year, he was made Governor of Madras, serving until 1911 and overseeing the reform of the Madras Legislative Council. Prominent in the Red Cross during the First World War, Lawley succeeded the youngest of his older brothers as Baron Wenlock in 1931, but died a year later. His only son had died in a hunting accident in 1909, and the title consequently became extinct upon his death.

== Early life and education ==
Lawley was born in 1860 to Beilby Lawley, 2nd Baron Wenlock, and his wife, Lady Elizabeth (née Grosvenor), a daughter of the 2nd Marquess of Westminster and a granddaughter of the 1st Duke of Sutherland. He was the seventh child to the couple and their fourth and youngest son. He was educated at Eton, where he became President of the Eton Society and Editor of the Eton Chronicle.

In October 1879, he went to Trinity College, Cambridge. However, Lawley did not complete his studies at Cambridge. Instead, he went in 1880 to the Royal Military Academy at Sandhurst and was commissioned as a lieutenant in the 10th Hussars in 1882. He served in India and in fought in the Sudan Mahdist War seeing action at Suakin (1884). In 1885 he was promoted to captain and served in the United Kingdom until 1892. Upon retiring from the army, he became involved in politics, serving as the private secretary to his uncle, the Duke of Westminster from 1892 to 1896, after which he was appointed secretary to Earl Grey, who went to administer Rhodesia after the Jameson Raid.

== Administrator of Matabeleland ==
When Albert Grey, 4th Earl Grey, was sent to Salisbury to replace Sir Leander Starr Jameson, Lawley was in due course appointed the acting administrator of Matabeleland representing the British South Africa Company. In November 1896, he was appointed Deputy Administrator for Matabeleland. He served as Administrator of Matabeleland from 1897 to 1901. In 1898, Lawley led a mission to the court of Lewanika, the king of Barotseland.

Lawley later wrote a detailed account and a diary of his journey to Barotseland and his experiences. An agreement was signed at the Victoria Falls on 21 June 1898 between King Lewanika and Captain Arthur Lawley with Robert Coryndon, the resident in Barotseland as witness. The ivory seal with its gold handle used by Lawley to endorse the Treaty is in The National Trust Collection at Tyntesfield.

The Second Matabele War, which began after the failure of the Jameson Raid in January 1896, concluded during Lawley's residence in Bulawayo with a victory for British settlers and a Peace Agreement on 13 October 1896, reached by Cecil Rhodes meeting with the Matabele Chiefs in the Matopos Hills. On the departure of Earl Grey in July 1897, Lawley succeeded Albert Grey, 4th Earl Grey, as the Administrator of Matabeleland and served from 1897 to 24 January 1901. As Deputy-administrator, Lawley participated in the Diamond Jubilee celebrations of Queen Victoria. As Cecil Rhodes was unwell, Captain Arthur Lawley gave the speech opening the Railway from Mafeking to Bulawayo on 4 November 1897. Captain Lawley sent half the force which relieved Mafeking under the command of Colonel Plumer in May 1900. He was in close contact with Colonel Robert Baden Powell, who later served under him as Chief of Police in the Transvaal.

== Governor of Western Australia ==
Lawley was knighted and appointed Governor of Western Australia in February 1901, and arrived in Albany aboard the ship Ophir, along with the Duke and Duchess of York (about to commence a royal tour). Lawley's official term as Governor of Western Australia ran from 1 May 1901 to 14 August 1902. One of his first duties was to represent Western Australia at the opening of the first Federal Parliament in Melbourne on 9 May 1901.

Despite only being governor for a little over 15 months, the inconclusive results of the 1901 state election meant that Lawley was met with five different governments during his time in office. He received the resignation of George Throssell on 21 May 1901, and commissioned George Leake as the new premier six days later. Leake's first government fell on 21 November 1901, but his replacement, Alf Morgans, was unable to form a new ministry, and resigned on 23 December 1901. Lawley then re-appointed Leake as premier. Leake almost immediately requested that Lawley dissolve parliament and order a new election, but Lawley refused, citing the precedent established by Lord Canterbury (the Governor of Victoria), in 1872, when he refused a dissolution to Charles Duffy. Despite this, Leake's government endured until his premature death on 24 June 1902. The final premier of Lawley's governorship, Walter James, was appointed on 1 July 1902.

In December 1901, Lawley toured the south-western parts of the province along with the Governor General Lord Hopetoun, a friend from Eton College. His tenure also witnessed instability in the Perth City Council. Lady Lawley devoted herself to numerous charities in particular the children's hospice at Cottesloe, known as Lady Lawley Cottage. The suburb of Mount Lawley in Perth is named after Lawley. Lawley laid the foundation stones of the Supreme Court of Justice and the Parliament of Western Australia.

== Lieutenant-Governor of the Transvaal ==
On the recommendation of Alfred Milner, 1st Viscount Milner, Lawley was appointed as Lieutenant-Governor of the Transvaal in July 1902. The Transvaal Colony had been established on the area which was previously the Boer republic of the same name, and Lawley was its first lieutenant-governor. He arrived in Pretoria at the end of August and was sworn in as lieutenant governor of the Transvaal on 29 September 1902, serving as such until December 1905.

South Africa in 1902 was emerging from the bitter conflict of the Second Boer War and under the leadership of Lord Milner, the Lieutenant Governor of the Transvaal had the arduous task of post war reconstruction. The visit of Joseph Chamberlain, the Colonial Secretary, greatly facilitated this and generous financial provision was made for rebuilding the devastated farms and settlements. However given that Britain had just conquered the Transvaal with its rich gold fields, diamond and platinum mines, this was the very least that could be expected. The administration brought in new cattle to restock the farms, tackled disease among livestock, and re-opened the mines controversially using imported Chinese labour in the Rand Goldfields, an idea backed by Lord Milner. Joseph Chamberlain went with Lawley on a tour of the Transvaal and endeavoured to establish cordial relations with the defeated Boers. On 25 June 1905, the Cullinan Diamond was discovered at the Premier Mine, near Pretoria. The diamond, which was cut to create the four Stars of Africa, was presented by Louis Botha, the First Prime Minister of South Africa, to King Edward VII in 1907.

Lawley's administration also saw the legislation introduced, which led to the creation of the Kruger National Park. and the University of the Witwatersrand. At one of the schools established at that time by Bishop William M. Carter and the Mirfield Fathers, a young Desmond Tutu received his education. Lawley's administration undertook the task of demarcating and allotting separate reserves in the Transvaal for indigenous Africans. In the end, Lawley set aside only about 3% of the Transvaal for Africans.

In 1903, due to petitions from Boer farmers, the government of Transvaal permitted them access to Kgatla reserves in the Bechuanaland protectorate to recover their stolen cattle on the condition they reciprocate by offering the Kgatla access to their own settlements. The Kgatla responded by requesting Lawley to merge Kgatla reserves in Bechuanaland and the Crown colony into a single settlement.

The Kgatla request was framed to enable their chief Lentshwe gain complete sovereignty over all the lands occupied by the Kgatla from the Boers during the Second Boer War. The request was turned down by Lawley, who, however, permitted Lentshwe to appoint his brother Ramono as his deputy over Saulspoort.

During his tenure, Lawley had reservations about Lord Milner's policy of importing cheap Chinese labour into Transvaal to work in the gold mines. Nonetheless, he pointed out the extent of success that had attended their work. The town of Lawley in Transvaal is named after Arthur Lawley. Mohandas Gandhi founded his Tolstoy model farm near the town of Lawley. Lawley encountered Mohandas Gandhi in the Transvaal and Gandhi wished him well when he was appointed Governor of the Madras Presidency in India.

== Governor of Madras ==
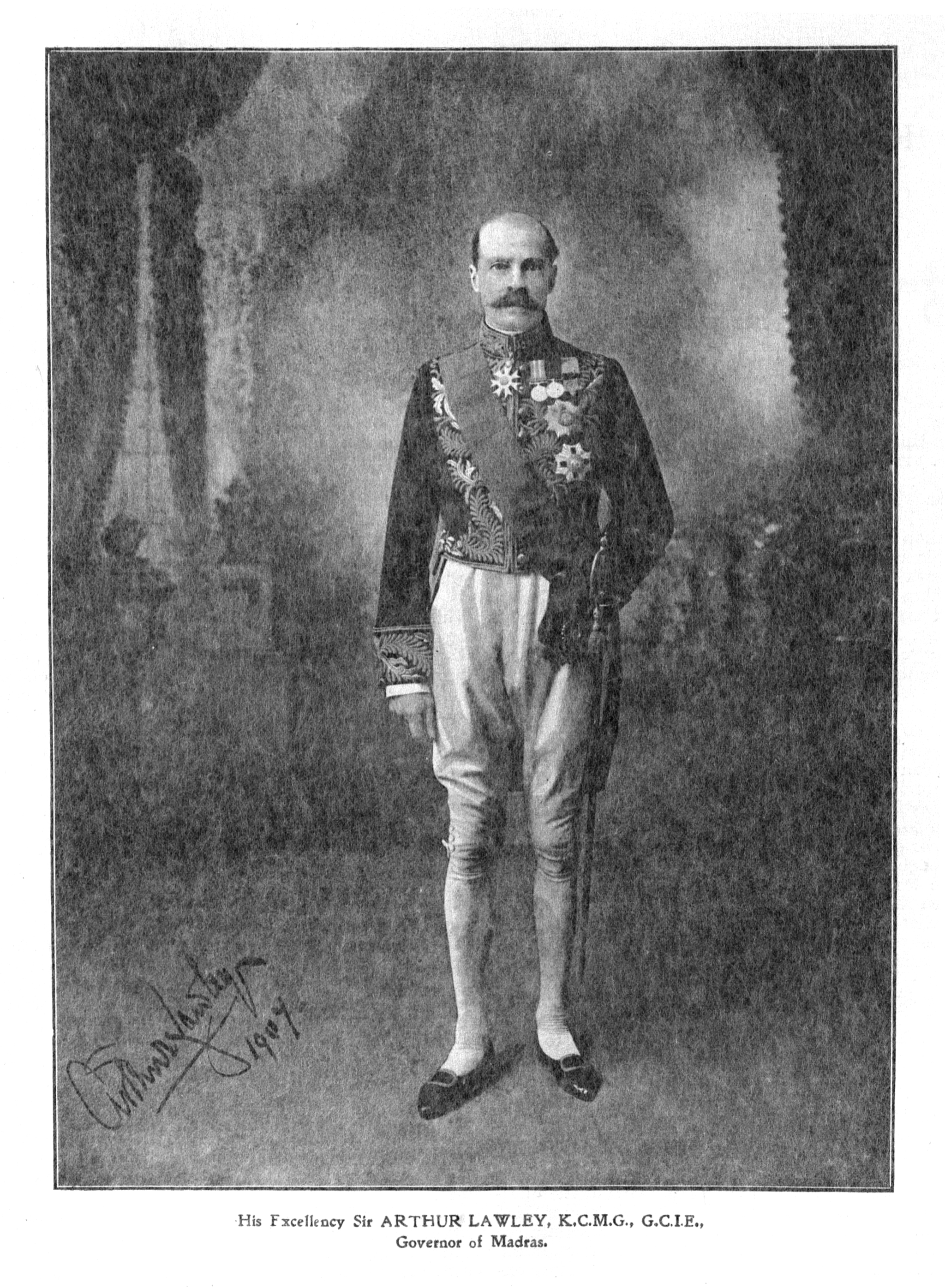
c. 1908

While serving as Lieutenant-Governor of Transvaal, Lawley was appointed Governor of Madras on 28 December 1905 at a monthly pay of Rs. 10,000. He took office on 28 March 1906 succeeding The Lord Ampthill. Lawley's eldest brother Beilby Lawley, 3rd Baron Wenlock had also served as the governor of Madras from 1891 to 1896. The Madras Legislative Council was completely reformed according to the Indian Councils Act 1909 and enlarged during his time. Lawley undertook a fifteen tours to acquaint himself of the administrative machinery prevailing in the Presidency. He took the opportunity to visit schools, hospitals and prisons, to meet with peasants, politicians, farmers and businessmen and to consult with government officials. During his tenure, the Madras Estates Land Bill was passed. In 1906, the Arbuthnot Bank of Madras crashed precipitating one of the worst financial disasters of the 20th century. Lawley, who was himself one of the stockholders, tried to raise public funds to rescue investors. The disillusioned investors eventually responded by founding the Indian Bank. At the end of 1908 Lawley introduced the Morley-Minto reforms which brought Indian representation into the government of Madras. He appointed the Maharaja of Bobbili to be the first Indian to have membership of the Executive.

Lawley also promoted the building of railways and encouraged modern agriculture and industrial development. With his close friend the Maharaja of Mysore he promoted technical education. In 1910 there was an Agricultural and Industrial Exhibition in Mysore.

The newly constructed building housing the Government Museum, Chennai was opened by Lawley on 5 September 1906. Lawley inaugurated the Victoria Memorial Hall in Madras on 28 March 1909 in memory of Queen Victoria. In 1910, Lawley unveiled a portrait of Queen Victoria inside the Victoria Public Hall after the building was acquired by the Suguna Vilas Sabha. On 27 October 1911, Lawley presided over the Annual Day function of the Madras Sanskrit College and presented diplomas to meritorious students.

Lawley inaugurated the Giffard School block of the Women and Children's Hospital in Egmore in October 1911. On 1 November 1911, Sir Arthur Lawley opened the Lady Lawley Nurses Home. Their Excellencies received extravagant garlands of flowers. The nurses' quarters was established opposite to the hospital and named after Lady Lawley.

== Later life and death ==
In August and September 1912 he visited Canada at the instigation of the First Lord of the Admiralty, Winston Churchill. He gave speeches in Ottawa and Winnipeg on the subject of "Canada, the Royal Navy and the Empire". The purpose was to encourage Canada to build Dreadnoughts for the Royal Navy. In May 1913, Lawley was Deputy Leader of the British Empire Delegation to the United States to celebrate 100 years of peace between Britain and the U.S.A. He delivered memorable speeches in New York, Washington, Philadelphia and Chicago. A photograph illustrating the arrival of the delegation was taken in New York on 7 May 1913. On 19 November 1914, he accompanied Lady Roberts to the State Funeral in St Paul's Cathedral of her husband, Field Marshal Frederick Roberts, 1st Earl Roberts of Kandahar. During the First World War, Lawley served as a Commissioner of the British Red Cross Society in Boulogne, France. In 1917 he served as Red Cross Commissioner in Mesopotamia and liaised with the Indian Red Cross because so many Indian soldiers were injured in Mesopotamia.

In 1919, Lawley represented Britain at the Founding of the International Red Cross at Versailles. In 1920 he was asked by Earl Haig to found the Officers' Section of the British Legion. In his later life, he served as the director of numerous London-based companies including Forestal in Argentina. In 1927 Lawley and Lady Lawley visited the Fairbridge Farm School at Pinjarra, Western Australia, and Lady Lawley Cottage. He remained president of the Child Emigration Society until 1929. He succeeded his brother, Reverend Algernon George Lawley, who died without an heir, as the 6th Baron Wenlock in June 1931.

Lord Wenlock died on 14 June 1932 at Freiburg, in Baden Württemberg, Germany, and was interred at St Helen's Church Escrick, Yorkshire. As he had no surviving sons, he was the last Baron Wenlock.

== Legacy ==
A road in Coimbatore in southern India is named after him. The Lawley Institute in Ooty, a gentlemen's club, commemorates his governorship of the Madras Presidency. Mount Lawley, a suburb of Perth, Western Australia is named after him, as is Lawley, Gauteng, a township in Johannesburg. Lawley's Court Dress as Governor of Madras is kept in the National Trust Victorian House of Tyntesfield.

Lady Lawley lived there from 1939 until her death in 1944 and many things in the house belonged to Sir Arthur and Lady Lawley. Portraits of Sir Arthur Lawley as Governor of Western Australia, Lady Lawley painted in Madras in 1911, and of their son Richard Edward Lawley are to be seen at Tyntesfield. There were two dozen photo albums kept at Tyntesfield which were loaned to the Empire and Commonwealth Museum. Many of the photographs can be seen in the biography – Sir Arthur Lawley, Eloquent Knight Errant (see below).

== In literature ==
Immortalized by R. K. Narayan through all his books set in the fictional town of Malgudi. The main road in that town is Lawley Road. There is a statue of Lawley there. The road features in most of Narayan's stories. There is even one of a supposed historic visit of Lawley in the past.

== Family ==
On 15 October 1885, he married Annie Allen Cunard (1863–1944), a daughter of Sir Edward Cunard, 2nd Baronet. The Baroness Wenlock was appointed a Dame Grand Cross of the Order of the British Empire (GBE) in 1917.

The couple had three children:

- Richard Edward Lawley (8 May 1887 – 4 September 1909). He was killed in a hunting accident at Ooty (Coonoor) in Southern India, aged 22.
- Hon. Ursula Mary Lawley (later Mrs. George Gibbs, then Lady Wraxall, then the Dowager Lady Wraxall; 8 June 1888 – 16 October 1979). She married George Gibbs (later the 1st Baron Wraxall), on 20 July 1927. From 1927 until her death in 1979 she lived at Tyntesfield in Somerset, England.
- Hon. Margaret Cecilia Lawley (later Mrs. Geoffrey Dawson; 15 June 1889 – 3 May 1969). She married Geoffrey Dawson, editor of The Times, on 14 June 1919. He was Trustee for the Second Lord Wraxall during his minority until 1944.

== Honours ==
Knight Grand Commander of the Star of India (GCSI)	12 December 1911
Knight Grand Commander of the Order of the Indian Empire (GCIE)	28 March 1906
Knight Commander of the Order of St Michael and St George (KCMG)	1 March 1901
Knight of Justice of the Order of Saint John (KStJ)	1 June 1920
Knight of Grace of the Order of Saint John (KStJ)	1 November 1917
Knight of the Order of Leopold ( (Belgium) ; Special List)	24 March 1921

=== Military ranks ===
- 9 August 1882: Lieutenant
- 10 August 1889: Captain (resigned commission 23 March 1892)
- 19 February 1915: Temporary Lieutenant-Colonel
- 9 December 1915: Temporary Colonel
- 21 December 1916: Temporary Honorary Colonel

== Sources ==
- "Lawley, Sir Arthur (1860–1932)". Australian Dictionary of National Biography. Australian National University. 1986.
- Rao, C. Hayavadana, ed. (1915). "Lawley, Hon'ble Sir Arthur" . The Indian Biographical Dictionary . Vol. 13.1. Madras: Pillar & Co. p. 248.
- John F. Riddick (1998). Who was who in British India. Greenwood Press. p. 210. ISBN 978-0-313-29232-3.
- Sir Arthur Lawley, Eloquent Knight Errant, David J. Hogg. Lady Lawley Cottage (Western Australian Red Cross). 2008. ISBN 978-0-9554457-2-9.

Government offices
Preceded by Sir Gerard Smith	Governor of Western Australia; 1901–1902	Succeeded by Sir Frederick Bedford
New title	Lieutenant-Governor of the Transvaal; 1902–1905	Succeeded by Richard Solomon
Preceded by Sir Gabriel Stokes (acting)	Governor of Madras; 1906–1911	Succeeded by The Lord Carmichael
Peerage of the United Kingdom
Preceded by Algernon Lawley	Baron Wenlock; 1931–1932	Extinct
