= Paul Thompson, 1st Baron Wenlock =

English nobleman and Whig politician

Paul Beilby Lawley Thompson, 1st Baron Wenlock (1 July 1784 – 9 May 1852), born Paul Beilby Lawley, was an English nobleman and Whig politician.

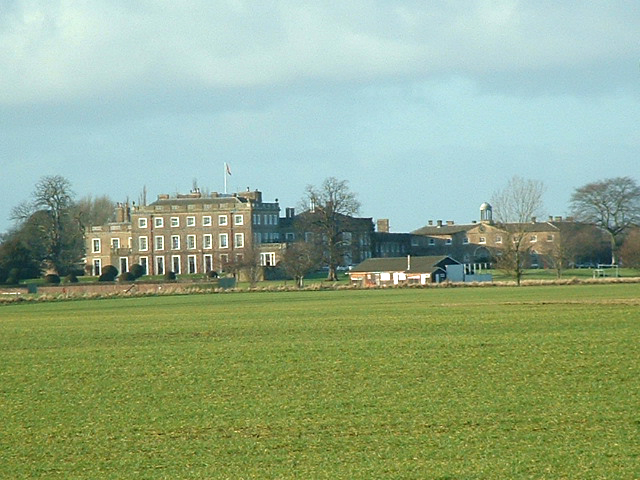
Escrick Hall - now a school

== Life ==
Thompson was born Paul Beilby Lawley, the youngest son of Sir Robert Lawley, 5th Baronet, and his wife Jane (née Thompson).

In 1820, he inherited the estate of Escrick in Yorkshire from his maternal uncle, Richard Thompson, and changed his name to Paul Beilby Thompson. He entered Parliament for Wenlock, in Shropshire in 1828, and retained the seat until 1832. He then stood for the East Riding of Yorkshire, and was member there until 1837. In 1839, he was created Baron Wenlock, of Wenlock in the County of Salop, a title previously held by his eldest brother Robert, who died without issue. Upon ennoblement, he was given a royal licence to change his name to Paul Beilby Lawley Thompson, and to allow his heirs to carry only the Lawley surname.

He married Caroline Neville (d. 1868), daughter of Richard Griffin, 2nd Baron Braybrooke, by whom he had five children:

- Beilby Richard Lawley, 2nd Baron Wenlock (1818–1880)
- Robert Neville Lawley (30 August 1819 – 1 November 1891), captain in the 2nd Life Guards and later military historian, married Georgina Emily Somerset, daughter of Lord Edward Somerset, and died without issue
- Rev. Stephen Willoughby Lawley (1823 – c. 1901), rector at Escrick 1848–1868 and sub-dean of York 1852–1862.
- Francis Charles Lawley (1825–1901), journalist and politician
- Jane Lawley (1820–1900), married James Archibald Stuart-Wortley

Parliament of the United Kingdom
Preceded by Francis Forester; William Lacon Childe	Member of Parliament for Wenlock; 1826–1832; With: John Weld-Forester 1826–1828; George Weld-Forester 1828–1832	Succeeded by George Weld-Forester; James Milnes Gaskell
New constituency	Member of Parliament for the East Riding of Yorkshire; 1832–1837; With: Richard Bethell	Succeeded by Richard Bethell; Henry Broadley
Honorary titles
Preceded by The Earl of Carlisle	Lord Lieutenant of the East Riding of Yorkshire; 1840–1847	Succeeded by Viscount Morpeth
Peerage of the United Kingdom
New creation	Baron Wenlock; 2nd creation 1839–1852	Succeeded by Beilby Lawley
Baronetage of England
Preceded by Francis Lawley	Baronet (of Spoonhill); 1851–1852	Succeeded by Beilby Lawley
