= Baron Wenlock =

Extinct barony in the Peerage of England

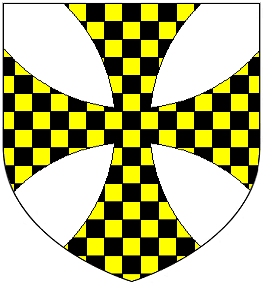
Arms of Lawley: Argent, a cross formée extended to the extremes of the shield chequy or and sable

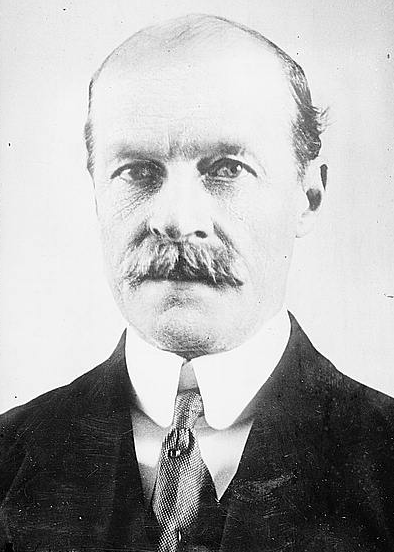
Arthur Lawley, 6th and last Baron Wenlock

Baron Wenlock is a title that has been created three times, once in the Peerage of England and twice in the Peerage of the United Kingdom. The first creation came in 1461 when the soldier Sir John Wenlock was summoned to Parliament as Lord Wenlock. However, he was childless and on his death in 1471 the title became extinct.

The second creation came in the Peerage of the United Kingdom in 1831 when Sir Robert Lawley, 6th Baronet, was created Baron Wenlock, of Wenlock in the County of Shropshire. He had earlier represented Newcastle-under-Lyme in the House of Commons. On his death in 1834 the barony became extinct. He was succeeded in the baronetcy by his younger brother, the seventh Baronet. He was a former Member of Parliament for Warwickshire.

On his death the title passed to his younger brother, the eighth Baronet. In 1820 he had inherited the Escrick estate in Yorkshire from his uncle Richard Thompson and had assumed by Royal licence the surname of Thompson in lieu of Lawley. He also represented Wenlock and the East Riding of Yorkshire. In 1839, twelve years before he succeeded in the baronetcy, the barony created for his elder brother was revived when he was made Baron Wenlock, of Wenlock in the County of Shropshire. His son, the second Baron, was Member of Parliament for Pontefract and served as Lord Lieutenant of the East Riding of Yorkshire.

His eldest son, the third Baron, notably served as Governor of Madras. His fourth brother, the sixth Baron (who succeeded his elder brother in 1931, who in his turn had succeeded his elder brother in 1918), served as Governor of Western Australia, of the Transvaal Republic and of Madras. His only son and heir Hon. Richard Edward Lawley died at an early age and on Lord Wenlock's death in 1932 both titles became extinct.

The Lawley baronetcy, of Spoonhill in the County of Shropshire, was created in the Baronetage of England on 16 August 1641 for Thomas Lawley, who represented Wenlock in Parliament. His son, the second Baronet, was Member of Parliament for both Wenlock and Shropshire. His eldest son, the third Baronet, also represented Wenlock in the House of Commons. The fifth Baronet was Member of Parliament for Warwickshire. He was succeeded by his eldest son, the sixth Baronet, who was elevated to the peerage as Baron Wenlock in 1831. The fourth and sixth Baronets served as High Sheriff of Staffordshire in 1743 and 1797 respectively. The seventh Baronet was High Sheriff of Warwickshire in 1839.

== Barons Wenlock, first creation (1461) ==
- John Wenlock, 1st Baron Wenlock (d. 1471)

== Barons Lawley, second and third creations ==
=== Lawley baronets, of Spoonhill (1641) ===
- Sir Thomas Lawley, 1st Baronet (d. 1646)
- Sir Francis Lawley, 2nd Baronet (c. 1630 – 1696)
- Sir Thomas Lawley, 3rd Baronet (c. 1650 – 1729)
- Sir Robert Lawley, 4th Baronet (d. 1779) (son)
- Sir Robert Lawley, 5th Baronet (1736–1793) (son)
- Sir Robert Lawley, 6th Baronet (1768–1834) (son) (created Baron Wenlock in 1831)

=== Barons Wenlock (1831) ===
- Robert Lawley, 1st Baron Wenlock (1768–1834)

=== Lawley baronets, of Spoonhill (1641; reverted) ===
- Sir Francis Lawley, 7th Baronet (1782–1851)
- Sir Paul Beilby Lawley Thompson, 8th Baronet (1784–1852) (had already been created Baron Wenlock in 1839)

=== Barons Wenlock (1839) ===
- Paul Thompson, 1st Baron Wenlock (1784–1852)
- Beilby Lawley, 2nd Baron Wenlock (1818–1880)
- Beilby Lawley, 3rd Baron Wenlock (1849–1912)
- Richard Lawley, 4th Baron Wenlock (1856–1918)
- Algernon Lawley, 5th Baron Wenlock (1857–1931)
- Arthur Lawley, 6th Baron Wenlock (1860–1932)

=== Title succession chart ===
Male-line family tree, Lawley baronets and Barons Wenlock (both creations).

Sir Thomas Lawley; 1st Baronet died 1646
Sir Francis Lawley; 2nd Baronet c. 1630 – 1696
Sir Thomas Lawley; 3rd Baronet c. 1650 – 1729 | Francis Lawley
Sir Robert Lawley; 4th Baronet died 1779 | George Lawley
Sir Robert Lawley; 5th Baronet; 1736–1793
Baron Wenlock (1831 creation) | Baron Wenlock (1839 creation)
Robert Lawley; 1st Baron Wenlock; 6th Baronet; 1768–1834 | Sir Francis Lawley; 7th Baronet; 1782–1851 | Paul Thompson; 1st Baron Wenlock; 8th Baronet; 1784–1852
Barony extinct
Beilby Lawley; 2nd Baron Wenlock; 1818–1880 | Hon. Robert Lawley; 1819–1881 | Rev. Hon. Stephen Lawley; 1823–1905 | Hon. Francis Lawley; 1825–1901
Beilby Lawley; 3rd Baron Wenlock; 1849–1912 | Richard Lawley; 4th Baron Wenlock; 1856–1918 | Algernon Lawley; 5th Baron Wenlock; 1857–1931 | Arthur Lawley; 6th Baron Wenlock; 1860–1932 | Hon. Robert Lawley; 1863–1924
Baronetcy and barony extinct
Hon. Richard Lawley; 1887–1909
