= Robert Lawley, 1st Baron Wenlock =

British landowner and politician

Robert Lawley, 1st Baron Wenlock (1768 – 10 April 1834) was a British landowner and politician, the eldest son of Sir Robert Lawley, 5th Baronet and Jane Thompson.

Lawley attended the military school at Brienne, France, at the time Napoleon Bonaparte was there.

His seat was Canwell Hall, Staffordshire and he served as High Sheriff of Staffordshire in 1797.

In 1793 he married Anna Maria Denison (19 October 1770 – 20 August 1850), younger daughter of the banker Joseph Denison, but the couple had no children. In 1825 he befriended John Hollins and they journeyed to Italy together.

He was raised to the peerage as Baron Wenlock, of Wenlock in the County of Salop in 1831. Upon his death in Florence on 10 April 1834, the Barony became extinct.

He was buried at St Bartholomew Church, Hints, Staffordshire on 19 August 1834.

Parliament of the United Kingdom
Preceded by William Egerton; Edward Bootle-Wilbraham	Member of Parliament for Newcastle-under-Lyme; 1802–1806; With: Edward Bootle-Wilbraham	Succeeded by Edward Bootle-Wilbraham; James Macdonald
Peerage of the United Kingdom
New title	Baron Wenlock; 1831–1834	Extinct
Baronetage of England
Preceded by Robert Lawley	Baronet (of Spoonhill); 1793–1834	Succeeded by Francis Lawley
