= Cecil Forester (MP) =

British soldier and politician

Lieutenant Colonel Cecil Forester

Member of Parliament for Wenlock
- Preceded by: George Forester; Brooke Forester
- Succeeded by: George Forester; Sir Henry Bridgeman

Personal details
- Born: c. 1721
- Died: 22 August 1774 (aged 52–53)
- Spouse: Anne Townshend
- Relations: Brooke Forester (brother); Sir William Forester (grandfather)
- Children: 7, including Cecil, Francis
- Parent(s): William Forester; Catherine Brooke
- Education: Westminster School

Lt-Col. Cecil Forester (c. 1721 – 22 August 1774) was a British soldier and Member of Parliament.

== Early life ==
Forester was born in c. 1721 as the second son of William Forester of Dothill in Wellington, Shropshire (now Telford) and Catherine Brooke, daughter and heiress of William Brooke of Clerkenwell. His elder brother was Brooke Forester, also a longtime MP for Wenlock who married Elizabeth Weld (daughter and sole heiress of George Weld of Willey Park). Through his brother, he was uncle to George Forester. His sister, Mary Forester, was the wife of Sir Brian Broughton-Delves, 4th Baronet and Humphrey Mackworth Praed, MP for St Ives.

His paternal grandparents were Sir William Forester and Lady Mary Cecil (a daughter of the 3rd Earl of Salisbury). His aunt, Mary Forester, married Sir George Downing, 3rd Baronet.

He was educated at Westminster School.

== Career ==
Forester purchased a Cornet in the 4th Dragoons, British Army in 1739. He was made Major of the 46th Foot (under Lt.-Gen. Hon. Thomas Murray) in 1748, Lieutenant Colonel in 1752. He was a Lieutenant Colonel in the 11th Foot in 1755 (under Lt.-Gen. Maurice Bocland) before selling out in 1760 after failing to secure appointment as aide-de-camp to the King.

=== Political career ===
Like his father and grandfather before him, he was returned as Member of Parliament for Wenlock between 1761 and 1768, serving alongside his elder brother Brooke (an ally of the Duke of Newcastle). Other than a vote against the peace preliminaries in December 1762, "not a single vote, and not a single speech, by him is recorded during his seven years in Parliament."

== Personal life ==
Forester married Anne Townshend (d. 1825), daughter and coheiress of Robert Townshend of Christleton, Cheshire. Together, they lived at Rossall, Shrewsbury, and were the parents of five sons and two daughters, including:

- Cecil Forester (1767–1828), later Weld-Forester who was created Baron Forester, also an MP for Wenlock who married Lady Katherine Mary Manners, daughter of Charles Manners, 4th Duke of Rutland, and Lady Mary Isabella Somerset, in 1800.
- George Towshend Forester (1768–1845), later Townshend-Forester, the Recorder of Wenlock who married Ann Jones, daughter of J. Jones.
- Rev. Townshend Forester (1772–1841), the Prebendary of Worcester who married Anna Maria Byne, daughter of Maj. Byne, in 1786.
- Maj. Francis Forester (1774–1861), also an MP for Wenlock who married Lady Louisa Vane, a daughter of William Vane, 1st Duke of Cleveland and Lady Catherine Powlett (a daughter of the 6th Duke of Bolton), in 1813.

Forester died on 22 August 1774. His widow died on 24 May 1825.

=== Descendants ===
Through his eldest son Cecil, he was a grandfather of John Weld-Forester, 2nd Baron Forester (who married Alexandrine, Viscountess Melbourne, a daughter of Joachim Carl Ludwig, Count von Maltzan, and widow of Frederick Lamb, 3rd Viscount Melbourne), Anne Stanhope, Countess of Chesterfield (wife of George Stanhope, 6th Earl of Chesterfield), Hon. Elizabeth Weld-Forester (wife of Robert Carrington, 2nd Baron Carrington), Hon. Isabella Weld-Forester (wife of Maj.-Gen. Hon. George Anson), George Weld-Forester, 3rd Baron Forester (who married Hon. Mary Anne Jervis, a daughter of the 2nd Viscount St Vincent), Hon. Henrietta Weld-Forester (wife of Albert Denison, 1st Baron Londesborough), Hon. Charles Weld-Forester (who married Lady Maria Jocelyn, daughter of the 3rd Earl of Roden), Rev. Orlando Weld-Forester, 4th Baron Forester, and Hon. Selina Weld-Forester (wife of Orlando Bridgeman, 3rd Earl of Bradford).

Parliament of Great Britain
Preceded by George Forester; Brooke Forester	Member of Parliament for Wenlock; 1761–1768; With: Brooke Forester	Succeeded by Sir Henry Bridgeman; George Forester
