= John Weld-Forester, 2nd Baron Forester =

British politician

The Right Honourable The Lord Forester PC

Member of Parliament for Member of Parliament for Wenlock
- In office 1826–1828 Serving with Paul Thompson
- Preceded by: Francis Forester; William Lacon Childe
- Succeeded by: Paul Thompson; George Weld-Forester

Captain of the Honourable Corps of Gentlemen-at-Arms
- In office 8 September 1841 – 29 June 1846
- Monarch: Victoria
- Prime Minister: Sir Robert Peel, Bt
- Preceded by: The Lord Foley
- Succeeded by: The Lord Foley

Personal details
- Born: John George Weld Forester; 9 August 1801 Sackville Street, London
- Died: 10 October 1874 (aged 73) Willey Hall, Shropshire
- Party: Tory
- Spouse(s): Alexandrine Lamb, Viscountess Melbourne (m. 1856; died 1874)
- Relations: Charles Manners, 4th Duke of Rutland (grandfather); Cecil Forester (grandfather)

John George Weld Weld-Forester, 2nd Baron Forester PC (9 August 1801 – 10 October 1874), was a British Tory politician. He served as Captain of the Honourable Corps of Gentlemen-at-Arms under Sir Robert Peel from 1841 to 1846.

== Early life ==
Forester was born in Sackville Street, London, on 9 August 1801. The Prince of Wales, later King George IV, a friend of his father, was his godfather. He was the eldest son of Cecil Weld-Forester, 1st Baron Forester, and Lady Katherine Mary Manners. His father assumed the additional surname of Weld in 1811, upon inheriting Willey Park from his cousin George Forester.

His paternal grandparents were Anne (née Townshend) Forester and Lt-Col. Cecil Forester, MP for Wenlock. Among his extended family was uncle Maj. Francis Forester (MP for Wenlock who married Lady Louisa Vane, a daughter of the 1st Duke of Cleveland). His maternal grandparents were Charles Manners, 4th Duke of Rutland and Lady Mary Isabella Somerset (a daughter of Elizabeth Berkeley and the 4th Duke of Beaufort).

== Career ==
Forester was elected to the House of Commons for Wenlock in 1826, a seat he held until 1828, when he succeeded his father as second Baron Forester and entered the House of Lords. In 1841 he was appointed Captain of the Honourable Corps of Gentlemen-at-Arms in the Tory administration of Sir Robert Peel, which he remained until the government fell in 1846. He was admitted to the Privy Council in 1841.

=== Associations with Disraeli ===
He was a friend of Benjamin Disraeli. Through Lord Forester's mother, another friend of Disraeli, Lord John Manners (later Duke of Rutland), a figure in Disraeli's Young England movement, was his own second cousin.

Lord Forester secured Disraeli's nomination as Tory parliamentary candidate for Shrewsbury for the 1841 General Election. Disraeli was subsequently returned as M.P., despite bitter opposition at the election, and held the seat until the 1847 General Election, when he contested and was subsequently elected for Buckinghamshire.

Later in life Disraeli, then a widower, had a simultaneous correspondence with two of Forester's sisters, the then-married Selina, Countess of Bradford and widowed Anne Elizabeth, Countess of Chesterfield. A collection of over 1,100 letters he wrote to the former between 1875 and his death in 1881, during most of which period he was Prime Minister, are preserved at Weston Park, Staffordshire.

=== Other interests ===
Lord Forester served in the South Salopian Yeomanry Cavalry, being promoted from Lieutenant to Captain in May 1826 and as late as 1852 was in command of a troop of theirs at Wellington, Shropshire. He took part with his troop when the yeomanry were deployed to suppress the 'Chartist' riots in Montgomeryshire in 1839.

A keen fox hunter from university days, Lord Forester was Master of Fox Hounds of the Belvoir Hunt in Leicestershire, of which the Duke of Rutland's family were also members, from 1830 to 1858, and was credited with bringing competitive athletics into Shropshire by his patronage of the Wenlock Olympian Games, where he normally presented the prize cups for the tilting matches.

In 1833 Lord Forester served as treasurer of the Salop Infirmary in Shrewsbury.

== Personal life ==
On 10 June 1856, Lord Forester married the German born Alexandrine Julie Theresa Wilhelmina Sophie Lamb, Viscountess Melbourne (née Countess von Maltzan) at St John's, Paddington, London. The widow of Frederick Lamb, 3rd Viscount Melbourne, from whom she had been separated in the last years of Melbourne's life, she was a daughter of Joachim Carl Ludwig, Count von Maltzan of Prussia. After Lord Forester's death it was stated the couple had one son who died an infant, although this does not appear stated in standard reference works on the peerage.

Lord Forester died childless at Willey Hall in October 1874, aged 73, and was buried at Willey parish church. His widow died in 1894. He was succeeded in the barony by his younger brother George, who was also a Tory politician.

Parliament of the United Kingdom
Preceded by Francis Forester; William Lacon Childe	Member of Parliament for Wenlock; 1826–1828; With: Paul Thompson	Succeeded by Paul Thompson; George Weld-Forester
Political offices
Preceded by The Lord Foley	Captain of the Honourable Corps of Gentlemen-at-Arms; 1841–1846	Succeeded by The Lord Foley
Peerage of the United Kingdom
Preceded by Cecil Weld-Forester	Baron Forester; 1828–1874	Succeeded by George Cecil Weld-Forester
