= Baron Forester =

Title in the Peerage of the United Kingdom

Baron Forester, of Willey Park in the County of Shropshire, is a title in the Peerage of the United Kingdom. It was created on 17 July 1821 for Cecil Weld-Forester, who had previously represented Wenlock in the House of Commons. Born Cecil Forester, he assumed the additional surname of Weld by royal licence in 1811. His son, the second Baron, also represented Wenlock from 1790 in Parliament, and later served in the Tory administration of Sir Robert Peel as Captain of the Honourable Corps of Gentlemen-at-Arms (Government Chief Whip in the House of Lords) from 1841 to 1846.

He was succeeded by his younger brother, the third Baron. He sat as a Conservative Member of Parliament for Wenlock for 46 years, and was Father of the House from 1873 to 1874. His nephew, the fifth baron, also represented Wenlock in Parliament as a Conservative. Both his son, the sixth baron, and grandson, the seventh baron, served as mayor of Wenlock. As of 2017, the title is held by the latter's grandson, the ninth baron, who succeeded his father in 2004.

The family were anciently hereditary foresters of Wellington Hay in Mount Gilbert Forest, and lived at Wellington or at Watling Street Hall (later Old hall), where they had a half virgate of land held by keeping the Hay. John Forester (died c. 1521) leased Wellington Hay from perhaps 1512, and another John Forester bought its freehold in 1555. The family became gentry and several of the family became Members of Parliament for Wenlock. Princess Alice, Duchess of Gloucester, was a great-great-granddaughter of the 1st Baron Forester.

The family seat since 1811 is Willey Hall, near Willey, Shropshire. The estate was inherited by Brooke Forester through his wife, Elizabeth Weld, and has remained in the Weld-Forester family for over two centuries.

== Predecessors ==
- Francis Forester (b. 1623) was High Sheriff of Shropshire in 1652.
- Sir William Forester (1655–1718), his son, inherited Dothill from his half-brother, Richard Steventon (died 1659), in about 1675 and became a Member of Parliament in 1678.
- William Forester (1690–1758), his son, served as MP for Wenlock (with substantial gaps) from 1715 until his death.
- Brooke Forester (1717–1774), his eldest son was its member continuously from 1734 to 1761. He married the heiress of George Weld of Willey Park and inherited that estate.
- Cecil Forester (c. 1721–1774), the younger brother of Brooke Forester, held the same seat from 1761 to 1768, during a gap in George's representation of it, and he was the father of the 1st Lord Forester.
- George Forester (1735–1811) sat for Wenlock (with gaps) from 1758 to 1790, when he was replaced by his cousin and heir, Cecil, later 1st Baron Forester.
- Francis Forester (1774–1861), the younger son of Cecil Forester and brother to the 1st Baron Forester, held the same seat from 1820 to 1826.

== Baron Forester (1821) ==
- Cecil Weld-Forester, 1st Baron Forester (1767–1828)
- John George Weld Weld-Forester, 2nd Baron Forester (1801–1874)
- George Cecil Weld Weld-Forester, 3rd Baron Forester (1807–1886)
- Orlando Watkin Weld Weld-Forester, 4th Baron Forester (1813–1894)
- Cecil Theodore Weld-Forester, 5th Baron Forester (1842–1917)
- George Cecil Beaumont Weld-Forester, 6th Baron Forester (1867–1932), educated at Harrow and Trinity College, Cambridge, and served as a captain in the Royal Horse Guards, later gaining the rank of lieutenant-colonel in the Shropshire Yeomanry; Mayor of Wenlock between 1920 and 1922. Succeeded as the 6th Baron on 20 November 1917.
- Cecil George Wilfred Weld-Forester, 7th Baron Forester (1899–1977), served during the First World War as a lieutenant in the Guards Machine Gun Regiment, educated for some time at Durham University (apparently without taking a degree), and eventually became colonel in the Royal Horse Guards. Succeeded as the 7th Baron on 10 October 1932.
- George Cecil Brooke Weld-Forester, 8th Baron Forester (1938–2004), educated at Eton and Royal Agricultural College. Succeeded as the 8th Baron on 4 January 1977.
- Charles Richard George Weld-Forester, 9th Baron Forester (born 1975)

The heir apparent is the present holder's son, the Hon. Brook George Percival Weld-Forester (born 2014).

== Male-line family tree ==
Male-line family tree, Barons Forester.

Cecil Weld-Forester; 1st Baron Forester; 1767–1828
John Weld-Forester; 2nd Baron Forester; 1801–1874	George Weld-Forester; 3rd Baron Forester; 1807–1886	Hon. Charles Weld-Forester; 1811–1852	Orlando Weld-Forester; 4th Baron Forester; 1813–1894
Cecil Weld-Forester; 5th Baron Forester; 1842–1917
George Weld-Forester; 6th Baron Forester; 1867–1932
Cecil Weld-Forester; 7th Baron Forester; 1899–1977
George Weld-Forester; 8th Baron Forester; 1938–2004
Charles Weld-Forester; 9th Baron Forester born 1975
Hon. Brook Weld-Forester born 2014

== Arms ==
Coat of arms of Baron Forester
Notes Arms, crest, and supporters as listed in Debrett's Peerage and Titles of Courtesy (1921). Crest 1: A talbot passant argent, collared sable, and line reflexed or. 2: A wyvern sable, guttée, collared and lined, and wings elevated or, on the wing an escallop argent. Escutcheon Quarterly: 1st and 4th quarterly, per fesse indented argent and sable, in the 1st and 4th quarters a bugle horn sable (Forester); 2nd and 3rd azure, a fesse nebulée between three crescents ermine, and in the centre chief point a cross crosslet fitchée or (Weld). Supporters Two talbots argent, collared sable, lined or, each with a bugle horn sable pendent from the collar.
