= Francis Forester =

British peer and politician

Major Francis Forester

Member of Parliament for Wenlock
- In office 1820–1826 Serving with William Lacon Childe
- Preceded by: John Simpson; Cecil Weld-Forester
- Succeeded by: John Weld-Forester; Paul Thompson

Personal details
- Born: Cecil Forester; 7 April 1767
- Died: 23 May 1828 (aged 61) St James's Place, London
- Party: Tory
- Spouse: Lady Louisa Catherine Barbara Vane (m. 1813; died 1821)
- Relations: Cecil Weld-Forester, 1st Baron Forester (brother)
- Parent(s): Cecil Forester; Anne Townshend

Major Francis Forester (19 August 1774 – 21 October 1861) was a Tory British Member of Parliament.

== Early life ==
Forester was born on 19 August 1774, just three days before his father died. He was the fifth and youngest son of Anne (née Townshend) Forester and Lt-Col. Cecil Forester, MP for Wenlock. His elder brother, Cecil, a personal friend of King George IV, assumed the additional surname of Weld by Royal Licence in 1811, upon inheriting Willey Park from their cousin George Forester. Among his siblings were George Townshend-Forester (Recorder of Wenlock), the Rev. Townshend Forester (Prebendary of Worcester).

His paternal grandparents were William Forester, also MP for Wenlock (and son of Sir William Forester and Lady Mary Cecil, a daughter of the 3rd Earl of Salisbury), and the former Catherine Brooke. His maternal grandfather was Robert Townshend.

== Career ==
Forester became a Lieutenant of the 95th Foot in 1793, Captain in 1794. He was a Captain of the 46th Foot in 1796 and Captain of the 15th Dragoon in 1799, a Major in the Royal Horse Guards in 1803. Forester had pursued his military career until he married a daughter of the Earl of Darlington, with whom he served in Portugal in 1808 and 1809.

=== Political career ===
At the 1820 general election, he was returned for Wenlock to replace his elder brother Cecil who had retired in anticipation of being elevated to the peerage. In line with another brother, the Rev. Townshend Forester who was the Rector of Broseley and Bailiff of Wenlock, he was recorded as voting against Catholic relief.

== Personal life ==
On 29 July 1813, Forester married Lady Louisa Catherine Barbara Vane (1791–1821), the eldest daughter of William Vane, 1st Duke of Cleveland (then Earl of Darlington) and Lady Catherine Margaret Powlett. Together, they were the parents of:

- William Forester (1816–1816), who died young.
- Honoria Forester (b. 1817), who married Thomas Thornhill, son of Thomas Thornhill and widower of Clara Peirse, in 1839.
- William Henry Forester (1819–1891), who married Hon. Eleanor Fraser, daughter of Hon. William Fraser (a son of the 16th Lord Saltoun), in 1858.

His wife died in 1821. Later in his life, Forester rented Somerby House and lived mainly in London, where he died at his home in St James's Place on 21 October 1861. He left his entire estate to his only surviving son William.

Parliament of the United Kingdom
| Preceded by John Simpson; Cecil Weld-Forester | Member of Parliament for Wenlock; 1820–1826; With: William Lacon Childe | Succeeded by John Weld-Forester; Paul Thompson |
