= Selina Bridgeman =

British correspondent of Benjamin Disraeli (1819–1894)

The Right Honourable The Countess of Bradford
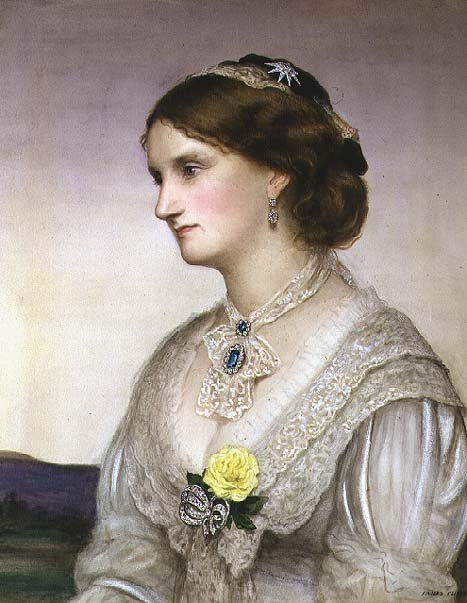
- Portrait of Lady Bradford, by Edward Clifford, 1876
- Born: Selina Louise Weld-Forester; 17 February 1819; Willey Park, Shropshire
- Died: 25 November 1894 (aged 75); Weston Park, Staffordshire
- Spouse: Orlando Bridgeman, 3rd Earl of Bradford (m. 1844)
- Children: 4
- Parent(s): Cecil Weld-Forester, 1st Baron Forester; Lady Katherine Manners
- Relatives: Charles Manners, 4th Duke of Rutland (grandfather)

Selina Louisa Bridgeman, Countess of Bradford (born Selina Louise Weld-Forester; 17 February 1819 – 25 November 1894) was a British peeress. Prime Minister Benjamin Disraeli was her admirer and he wrote her over 1,000 letters.

== Early life ==
Bridgeman was born on 17 February 1819 at the family home, Willey Park, Shropshire. She was the daughter of Cecil Weld-Forester, 1st Baron Forester and the former Lady Katherine Manners. Her father was a landowner and a keen follower of the hounds in Melton Mowbray who served as a Member of Parliament.

Her paternal grandparents were Anne (née Townshend) Forester and Lt-Col. Cecil Forester, MP for Wenlock. Her maternal grandparents were Charles Manners, 4th Duke of Rutland and Lady Mary Isabella Somerset (a daughter of the 4th Duke of Beaufort).

== Personal life ==
In 1844 she married Orlando George Charles Bridgeman, Viscount Newport who was then MP for South Shropshire. Together, they were the parents of:

- Lady Mabel Selina Bridgeman (d. 1933), who married Colonel William Kenyon-Slaney.
- Lady Florence Katharine Bridgeman (1859–1943), who married Henry Lascelles, 5th Earl of Harewood.
- George Cecil Orlando Bridgeman, 4th Earl of Bradford (1845–1915).
- Brig. Hon. Francis Charles Bridgeman (1846–1917).

In 1865 her husband became the 3rd Earl of Bradford. In 1871 she and her husband lived at Weston Park.

Lady Bradford died in 1894 at Weston Park and she was buried at Weston-under-Lizard.

=== Relationship with Disraeli ===
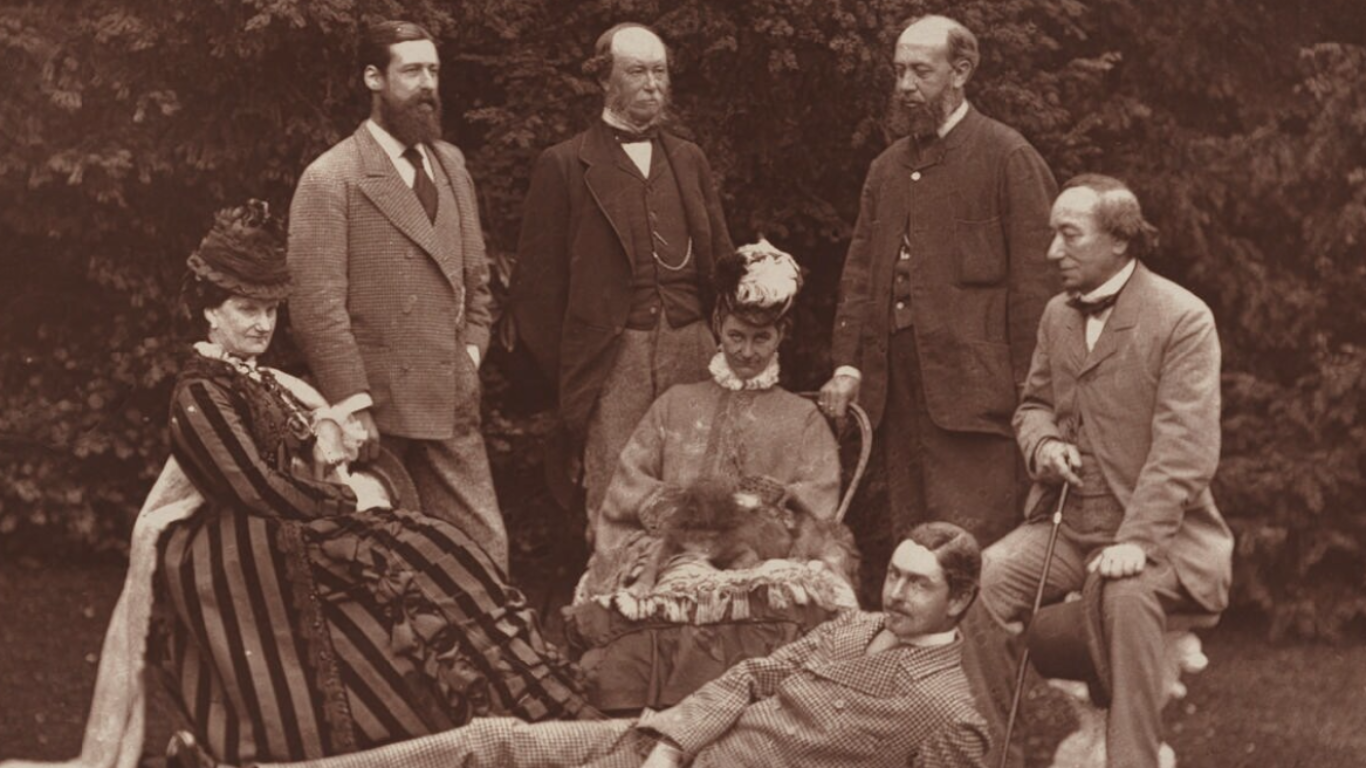
Group taken at Hughenden Manor including Selina on the left, her husband and Disraeli on the right

Benjamin Disraeli was to be important in her life and when she first met him in 1840 he had become an MP a few years before and she did not like him.

In late 1872, Mary Anne Disraeli died. She had been made the Viscountess of Beaconsfield in 1868. When Bridgeman re-met Benjamin Disraeli in the following July, he was a prospective Prime Minister, a 68 year old widower and he became devoted to her "intelligence, gaiety and sympathy". Disraeli began writing letters and in time passionate letters to "Dearest Lady Bradford". He also wrote admiring letters to her sister, Anne Stanhope, Countess of Chesterfield. He became Prime Minister and appointed Selina's husband to be master of the horse as it would enable Selina to "ride in Royal Carriages". She and Disraeli became close friends. He wrote her over 1,000 letters and these are extant. Her letters in reply were destroyed but there are hints that she was not cold to his ardour. She was married, but her sister had been a widow since 1866 and Disraeli proposed marriage to her. Anne had previously refused another Prime Minister (the Earl of Derby) proposal of marriage and Disraeli just wanted to be closer to Selina. Anne refused.

== In popular culture ==
She was painted in 1876 by Edward Clifford and her portrait was exhibited in the Royal Academy in 1879.
