= William Forester =

William Forester may refer to:

- Sir William Forester (1655–1718), MP for Wenlock 1679–85 and 1689–15
- William Forester (1690–1758), MP for Wenlock 1715–22, 1734–41 and 1754–58
- William A. Forester (1915–1988), American actor, primarily on TV (including Little House on the Prairie, 77 Sunset Strip, The Untouchables)
