= Cecil Weld-Forester =

Cecil Weld-Forester may refer to:

- Cecil Weld-Forester, 1st Baron Forester (1767–1828), British Member of Parliament and peer
- Cecil Weld-Forester, 5th Baron Forester (1842–1917), British peer and Member of Parliament
