= Brooke Forester =

English politician

Brooke Forester (7 February 1717 – 8 July 1774) was the long-serving Member of Parliament for the borough constituency of Wenlock from 1739 and 1768.

== Early life ==
He was the eldest son of William Forester of Dothill in Wellington, Shropshire (now Telford) and Catherine, daughter and heir of William Brooke of Clerkenwell.

== Career ==
Forester's father and grandfather, as well as his brother Cecil Forester and cousin Cecil Forester, later Weld-Forester and Baron Forester, all represented Wenlock.

== Personal life ==
Forester married twice. His first marriage was on 4 May 1734 to Elizabeth daughter and sole heiress of George Weld of Willey Park. Their only surviving son was George Forester.

Parliament of Great Britain
Preceded by William Forester; Samuel Edwards	Member of Parliament for Wenlock; 1739–1768; With: William Forester 1739–41; Sir Brian Broughton-Delves, Bt 1741–44; Isaac Hawkins Browne 1744–54; William Forester 1754–58; George Forester 1758–61; Cecil Forester 1761–68	Succeeded by Henry Bridgeman; George Forester
