= John Sambrooke =

British merchant and politician

John Sambrooke (c.1692–1734) was a British merchant and politician who sat in the House of Commons from 1726 to 1734.

Sambrooke was the third son of Sir Jeremy Sambrooke, merchant, of Bush Hill, near Enfield, Middlesex, and his wife Judith Vanacker, daughter of Nicholas Vanacker merchant of Erith, Kent. He was admitted at St Catharine's College, Cambridge on 4 July 1709 and became a merchant trading with Turkey. He married Elizabeth Forester, daughter of Sir William Forester, MP of Dothill Park, Shropshire and his wife Mary Cecil, daughter of James Cecil, 3rd Earl of Salisbury in May or June 1717.

Sambrooke was returned unopposed as Member of Parliament for Dunwich at a by-election on 4 April 1726. At the 1727 general election, he was returned as a Whig MP for Wenlock on the interest of his brother-in-law, William Forester. All his known votes were against the Government, which made it appear that he was a Tory, so that in 1733 Lord Bradford, the leader of the Shropshire Whigs, openly opposed his re-election. The local Tories offered to support him anyway, but the arguments of Sambrooke that his behavior was not exceptional for a Whig, and the attempts of Forester to persuade Bradford otherwise were unsuccessful. Sambrooke did not stand in 1734.

Sambrooke died without issue on 19 May 1734, three weeks after the election. His brother Sir Samuel Sambrooke, 3rd Baronet was also an MP.

Parliament of Great Britain
Preceded by Sir George Downing, Bt; Sir John Ward	Member of Parliament for Dunwich; 1726–1727; With: Sir George Downing, Bt	Succeeded by Sir George Downing, Bt; Thomas Wyndham
Preceded by Sir Humphrey Briggs; Samuel Edwards	Member of Parliament for Wenlock; 1727–1734; With: Samuel Edwards	Succeeded by William Forester. Samuel Edwards
