= Orlando Weld-Forester, 4th Baron Forester =

Reverend Orlando Watkin Weld Weld-Forester, 4th Baron Forester (18 April 1813 – 22 June 1894), known until 1886 as the Honourable Orlando Weld-Forester, was a British peer and Church of England clergyman.

== Family background and education ==
Weld-Forester was a younger son of Cecil Weld-Forester, 1st Baron Forester, and Lady Katherine Mary Manners. His elder brothers John Weld-Forester, 2nd Baron Forester, and George Weld-Forester, 3rd Baron Forester, were both Tory government ministers.

He was educated at Westminster School and Trinity College, Cambridge, where he graduated as MA in 1835.

== Clergy career ==
Weld-Forester was Rector of Broseley, near his family estates at Willey Hall from 1841 to 1859, of Doveridge, Derbyshire 1859 to 1867, and of Gedling near Nottingham from 1867 until, following his succession to the peerage, 1887.

He was also Prebendary of Hereford Cathedral (in whose diocese Broseley lay) from 1847 to 1868. In 1874 he became Residentiary Canon of York Minster and Chancellor of the Diocese of York, serving both offices until his death.

== Marriages and later life ==
Lord Forester married, firstly, Sophia Elizabeth Norman, daughter of Richard Norman, in 1840. After his first wife's death in 1872 he married, secondly, Emma Maria Tollemache, daughter of William Tollemache, in 1875.

In 1886, at the age of 72, he succeeded his elder brother as fourth Baron Forester. He died at his cathedral duty house in York in June 1894, aged 81, and was buried in Shropshire at Willey parish church. He was succeeded in the barony by his son from his first marriage, Cecil. Lady Forester died in 1898.

Peerage of the United Kingdom
Preceded by George Weld-Forester	Baron Forester; 1886–1894	Succeeded by Cecil Weld-Forester
