= Cecil Weld-Forester, 5th Baron Forester =

British politician (1842–1917)

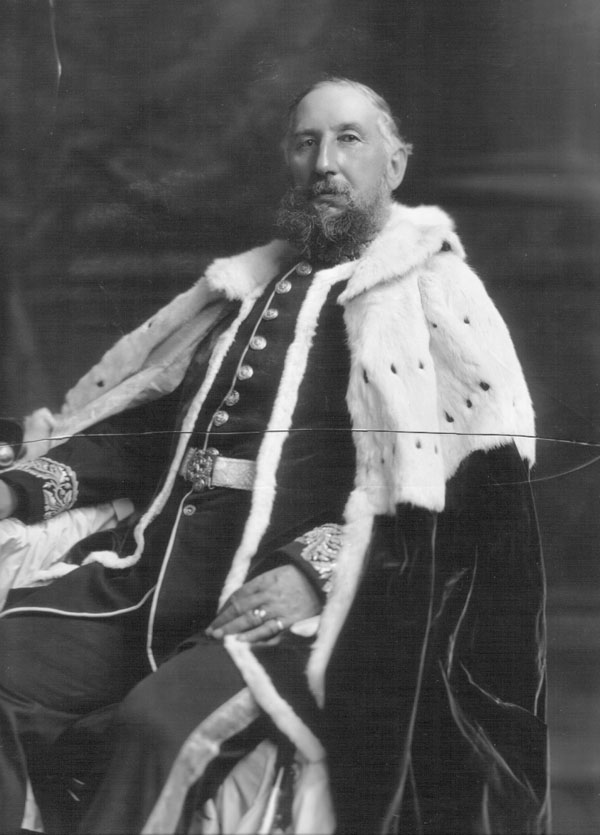
5th Baron Forester, photographed 26 September 1902.

Cecil Theodore Weld-Forester, 5th Baron Forester (3 August 1842 – 20 November 1917), was a British peer and Conservative Member of Parliament, styled The Honourable from 1886 to 1894.

Forester was the son of Reverend Orlando Weld-Forester, 4th Baron Forester, and Sophia Elizabeth Norman. He was educated at Harrow School and Trinity College, Cambridge.

He served as a young man as Lieutenant in the Royal Horse Guards.

He was elected to the House of Commons for Wenlock in 1874 (succeeding his uncle George Weld-Forester), a seat he held until 1885 when the constituency was abolished. In 1894 he succeeded his father as fifth Baron Forester and entered the House of Lords.

He also served in local government, as a member of Shropshire County Council, and was twice Mayor of the Borough of Wenlock. He was a DL and JP for the county of Shropshire, and JP for Kent.

In 1876, he served as President of the Wenlock Olympian Games and in 1902 as Treasurer of the Salop Infirmary in Shrewsbury.

Lord Forester married Emma Georgina Dixie, daughter of Sir Willoughby Wolstan Dixie, 8th Baronet, in 1866. He died at Brighton, Sussex, in November 1917, aged 75, and was buried at Willey, Shropshire. Lady Forester died in 1922.

He was succeeded in the barony by his eldest son George. His third son, Francis, married, as his second wife, Grace Peel, granddaughter of Whig prime minister John Russell. His sixth son, Edric, married Lady Victoria Wynn-Carington, daughter of Charles Wynn-Carington, 1st Marquess of Lincolnshire.

== Notes ==
Parliament of the United Kingdom
Preceded by George Weld-Forester; Alexander Hargreaves Brown	Member of Parliament for Wenlock; 1874–1885; With: Alexander Hargreaves Brown	Constituency abolished
Peerage of the United Kingdom
Preceded by Orlando Weld-Forester	Baron Forester; 1894–1917	Succeeded by George Weld-Forester
