= John Simpson (MP for Wenlock) =

British politician (1763–1850)

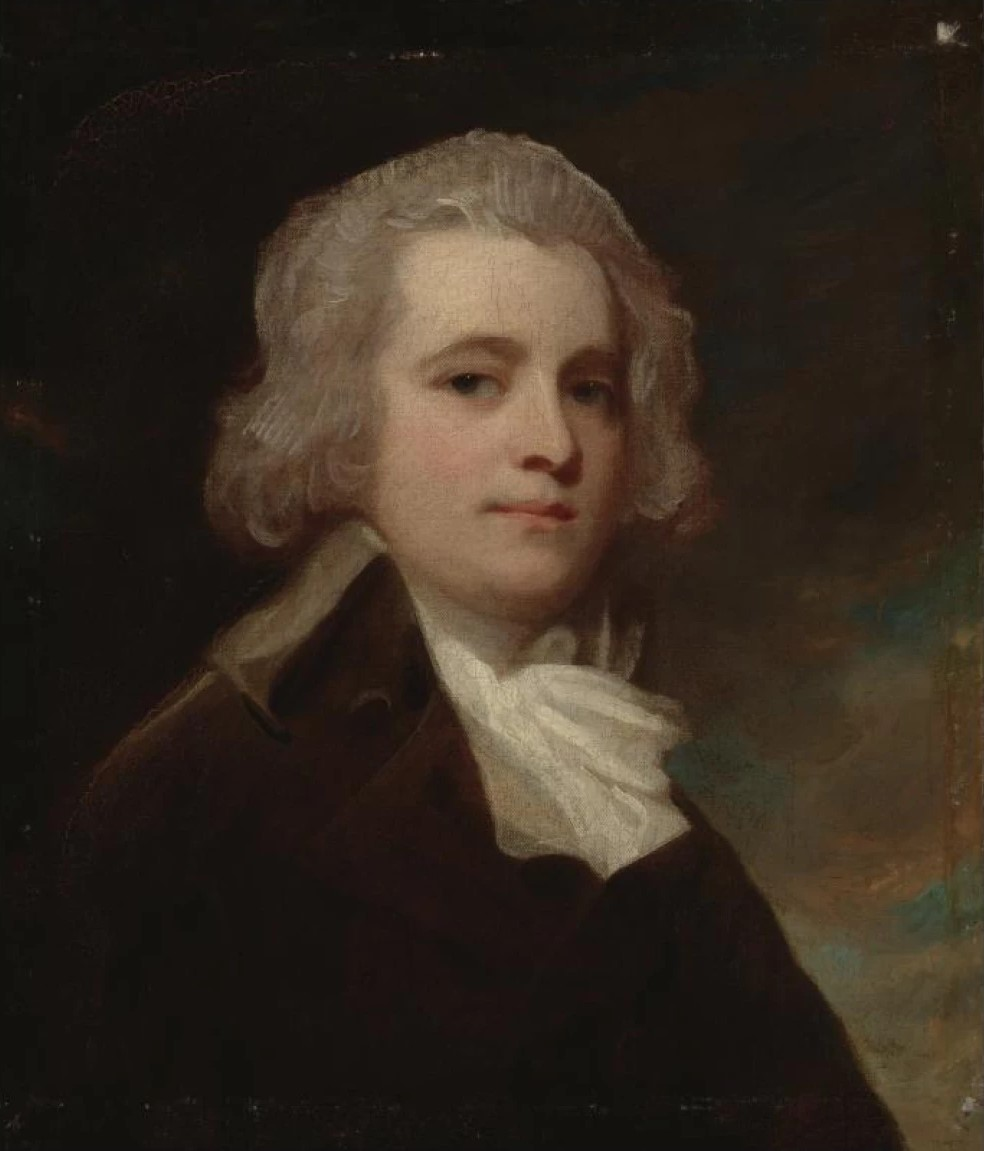
John Bridgeman Simpson (George Romney)

John Bridgeman Simpson (13 May 1763 – 5 June 1850) of Babworth Hall, Nottinghamshire was born John Bridgeman, a younger son of Sir Henry Bridgeman, later 1st Baron Bridgeman. He assumed the surname and arms of Simpson by Act of Parliament.

He served as Member of Parliament for Wenlock from 1784 to 1785 (resigned) and again from 1794 to 1820. He was selected High Sheriff of Nottinghamshire for 1794–95 and on 29 March 1797 was appointed lieutenant-colonel of the Derbyshire Militia.

On 3 June 1784 he married Henrietta, daughter of Sir Thomas Worsley. After she died in 1791 he married Grace, daughter of Samuel Estwicke on 27 November 1793.

Parliament of Great Britain
Preceded by Sir Henry Bridgeman, Bt; George Forester	Member of Parliament of Wenlock; 1784–1785; With: Sir Henry Bridgeman, Bt	Succeeded by Sir Henry Bridgeman, Bt; George Forester
Preceded by Sir Henry Bridgeman, Bt; Cecil Forester	Member of Parliament of Wenlock; 1794–1801; With: Cecil Forester	Succeeded by Parliament of United Kingdom
Parliament of the United Kingdom
Preceded by Parliament of Great Britain	Member of Parliament of Wenlock; 1801–1820; With: Cecil Forester	Succeeded by William Lacon Childe; Francis Forester
