= Bretby =

Village in Derbyshire, England

Coordinates: 52.804°N 1.566°W

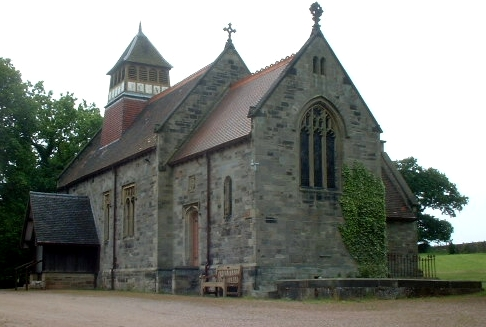
- St Wystan's Church at Bretby

- Bretby parish highlighted within Derbyshire
- Population: 893 (2011)
- OS grid reference: SK293230
- District: South Derbyshire
- Shire county: Derbyshire
- Region: East Midlands
- Country: England
- Sovereign state: United Kingdom
- Post town: BURTON-ON-TRENT
- Postcode district: DE15
- Police: Derbyshire
- Fire: Derbyshire
- Ambulance: East Midlands
- UK Parliament: South Derbyshire

Bretby is a village and civil parish in the south of Derbyshire, England, north of Swadlincote and east of Burton upon Trent, on the border between Derbyshire and Staffordshire. The population of the civil parish as of the 2011 census was 893. The name means "dwelling place of Britons". On the A511 road (formerly A50), there is a secondary settlement, Stanhope Bretby, which was the site of Bretby Colliery.

== History ==
This manor (Bretebi) was in the Domesday Book in 1086. Under the title of "The land of the King (in Derbyshire" it said:

In Newton Solney and Bretby Ælfgar had seven carucates of land to the geld. There is land for six ploughs. There the king has one plough and nineteen villans and one bordar with five ploughs. There are 12 acres (49,000 m^{2}) of meadow, woodland pasture two leagues long and three furlongs broad. TRE as now worth one hundred shillings.

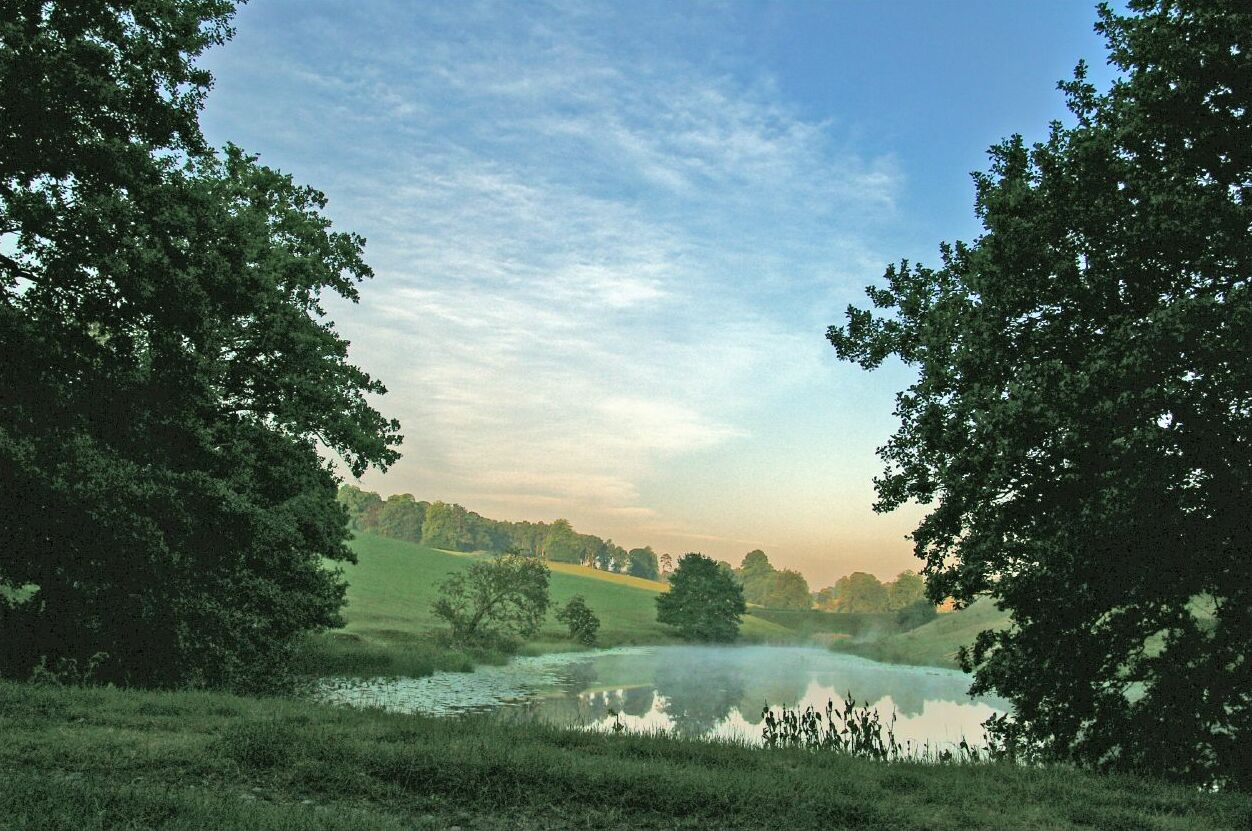
Bretby ponds are nearby

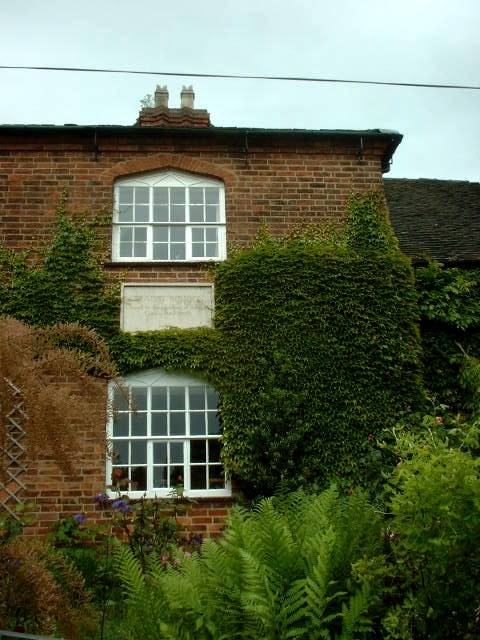
The former Bradby School – 2007

In 1209, Ranulph de Blondeville, 4th Earl of Chester granted the manor of Bretby to Stephen de Segrave who built a church and a mansion there. There was also Bretby Castle which was destroyed during the reign of King James I of England to make way for the construction of Bretby Hall.

In 1585, Thomas Stanhope bought Bretby Hall, which from then on was the home of the Earls of Chesterfield. George Herbert, 5th Earl of Carnarvon sold the property in the 1920s to pay for the Tutankhamun expedition.

== Today ==
Today the village is centred by a village green. Overlooking the green is a residential house which records that it was called 'Bradby School' when it was built. A stone records "BRADBY SCHOOL/OPENED FOR THE ADMISSION OF SCHOLARS/OCTOBER 20th 1806." The school building is a Grade II listed building.

The Grade II listed Church of England parish church is dedicated to St Wystan; it was rebuilt in 1877 by Anne Stanhope, Countess of Chesterfield. A memorial tablet on the south wall of the aisle is in memory of Benjamin Disraeli.

There is a small industrial area within Burton upon Trent and Swadlincote Green Belt, Bretby Stoneware Industrial Estate, based at the former Bretby Brick Works. It is at Middle Place, an access road which is a continuation of the Sunnyside lane from nearby Newhall through to the A511 Ashby Road.

== Notable residents ==
- Major-general Frank Roberts VC DSO OBE MC, British Army officer died in Stanhope Bretby in 1982. He was cremated at Bretby crematorium and his ashes buried in Bretby churchyard. He was awarded the Victoria Cross in 1918.
- Sir Herbert Wragg (1880–1956), Conservative MP for Belper, 1923–29 and 1931–45.
- Actor, director and musician Paddy Considine had an apartment at Bretby Hall until 2007.
- John Segrave, 2nd Baron Segrave, who at various times was Warden of Scotland and Seneschal of Gascony, owned (and sometimes stayed at) Bretby Castle; in 1301 he applied for, and was granted, licence to crenellate.

== See also ==
- Listed buildings in Bretby
- Bretby Art Pottery
