= Sir William Corbet, 5th Baronet =

British merchant and politician

Sir William Corbet, 5th Baronet (1702–1748), of Stoke, Shropshire was a British merchant and politician who sat in the House of Commons from 1728 to 1748.

Corbet was the eldest son of Sir Robert Corbet, 4th Baronet and his wife Jane Hooker, daughter of William Hooker. He married Harriot Pitt, daughter of Robert Pitt and Harriet Villiers of Boconnoc, Cornwall and elder sister of William Pitt, 1st Earl of Chatham.

Corbet stood unsuccessfully for Parliament at Newcastle-under-Lyme at a by-election in November 1724. He was man with some financial ability and in 1726 he was an Assistant in the Royal African Company. He joined interest with Henry Herbert, who supported him at Montgomery Boroughs at the 1727 general election. There was a double return in the poll and Corbet was not seated as Member of Parliament until 16 April 1728. He was on the board of the Royal African Company again from 1728 to 1731 and was one of three MPs who guided a petition relating to the Company's forts through Parliament in 1729 and 1730, in the face of opposition from the free traders to Africa. He was returned unopposed as MP for Montgomery Boroughs at the 1734 general election. He voted consistently with the Government and his only reported speech was in 1739 against the repeal of the Test Act. His father died on 3 October 1740 and he succeeded to the baronetcy. In 1741 he was appointed to the post of Commissioner of Revenue for Ireland which was worth £1,000 p.a. He transferred to Ludlow, another seat of Lord Powis, at the 1741 general election and was returned unopposed. He gave up his post as Commissioner of Revenue for Ireland in 1747, as under the Place Act 1742, holding it was incompatible with a seat in Parliament, and he was returned unopposed at the 1747 general election. In 1748 he was appointed to a life sinecure of Clerk of the Pipe worth about £500 p.a.

Corbet died without issue on 15 Sept 1748 of a dropsy.

Parliament of Great Britain
Preceded by John Pugh	Member of Parliament for Montgomery Boroughs; 1728 –1741	Succeeded by James Cholmondeley
Preceded by Richard Herbert; Henry Herbert	Member of Parliament for Ludlow; 1741–1748; With: Henry Herbert; Richard Herbert 1743	Succeeded by Richard Herbert; Henry Bridgeman
Baronetage of England
Preceded by Robert Corbet	Baronet (of Stoke upon Tern); 1740-1748	Succeeded by Henry Corbet
