= Anne Stanhope, Countess of Chesterfield =

British peeress and political confidante (1802-1885)

The Right Honourable The Countess of Chesterfield
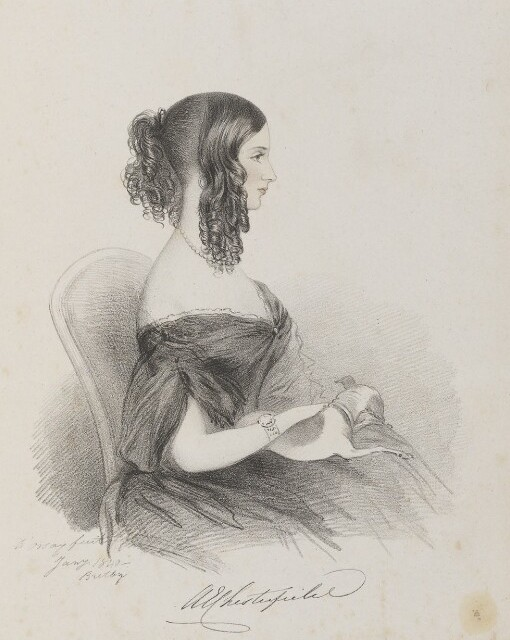
- by Richard James Lane, in 1840 after Alfred, Count D'Orsay
- Born: Anne Elizabeth Forester; 7 September 1802
- Died: 27 July 1885 (aged 82); Bretby
- Known for: Political correspondent
- Spouse: George Stanhope, 6th Earl of Chesterfield (m. 1830; died 1866)
- Children: George Stanhope, 7th Earl of Chesterfield; Evelyn Herbert, Countess of Carnarvon
- Parent(s): Cecil Weld-Forester, 1st Baron Forester; Lady Katherine Manners
- Relatives: Selina Bridgeman, Countess of Bradford (sister); Charles Manners, 4th Duke of Rutland (grandfather); George Herbert, 5th Earl of Carnarvon (grandson)

Anne Elizabeth Stanhope, Countess of Chesterfield (née Weld-Forester; 7 September 1802 – 27 July 1885) was a British peeress and political confidante.

== Life ==
Stanhope was born in 1802, the eldest daughter of Cecil Weld-Forester, MP, later the 1st Baron Forester, and Lady Katherine Manners, the daughter of Charles Manners, 4th Duke of Rutland. The family home was Willey Park in Shropshire. A younger sister was Selina Bridgeman, Countess of Bradford.

In 1830, Lord Derby proposed to her, but she instead accepted the proposal of George Stanhope, 6th Earl of Chesterfield. They had one son and a daughter, Lady Evelyn Stanhope (1834–1875), later the first wife of Henry Herbert, 4th Earl of Carnarvon. Anne Stanhope's husband was considered a wastrel, who spent much of his time asleep in Bretby Hall and let his lands at Bretby to go to waste. He died in June 1866, aged 61, and was succeeded by their son, George.

Like her sister Selina, Countess of Bradford, Anne was an intimate friend of Benjamin Disraeli. After they had both been widowed Disraeli is said to have proposed to her, but she declined, saying that people over seventy would be foolish to marry. Some of their friends thought that she refused him because she believed that he cared more for her sister. Nevertheless, she was Disraeli's confidante, and they exchanged hundreds of letters.

She continued to live at Bretby Hall. She died on 27 July 1885, having outlived her son and daughter.
