= Henry Bridgeman, 1st Baron Bradford =

British politician and peer (1725–1800)

The Right Honourable The Lord Bradford
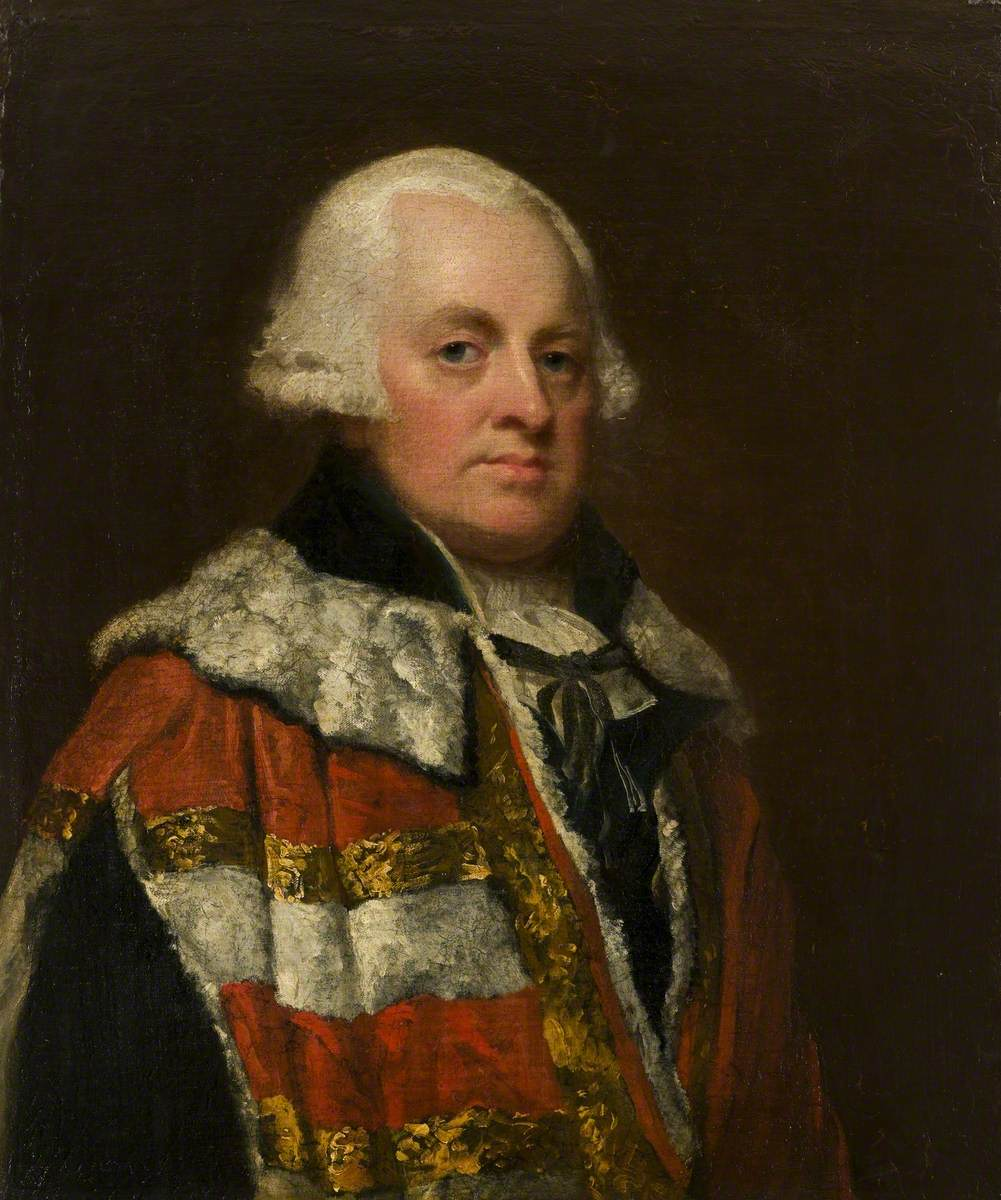
- Portrait by George Romney, 1794
- Successor: Orlando Bridgeman, 1st Earl of Bradford
- Other titles: 5th Baronet Bridgeman of Great Lever
- Born: 7 September 1725
- Died: 5 June 1800 (aged 74); Old Burlington Street, London
- Buried: Weston Park
- Spouse: Elizabeth Simpson
- Issue: Henry Simpson Bridgeman; Charlotte Bridgeman; Orlando Bridgeman, 1st Earl of Bradford; John Simpson; Elizabeth Bridgeman; Rev. Hon. George Bridgeman
- Parents: Sir Orlando Bridgeman, 4th Baronet; Lady Anne Newport

Henry Bridgeman, 1st Baron Bradford (7 September 1725 – 5 June 1800), known as Sir Henry Bridgeman, 5th Baronet, between 1764 and 1794, was a British politician who sat in the House of Commons for 46 years from 1748 to 1794 when he was raised to the peerage as Baron Bradford.

== Background and education ==
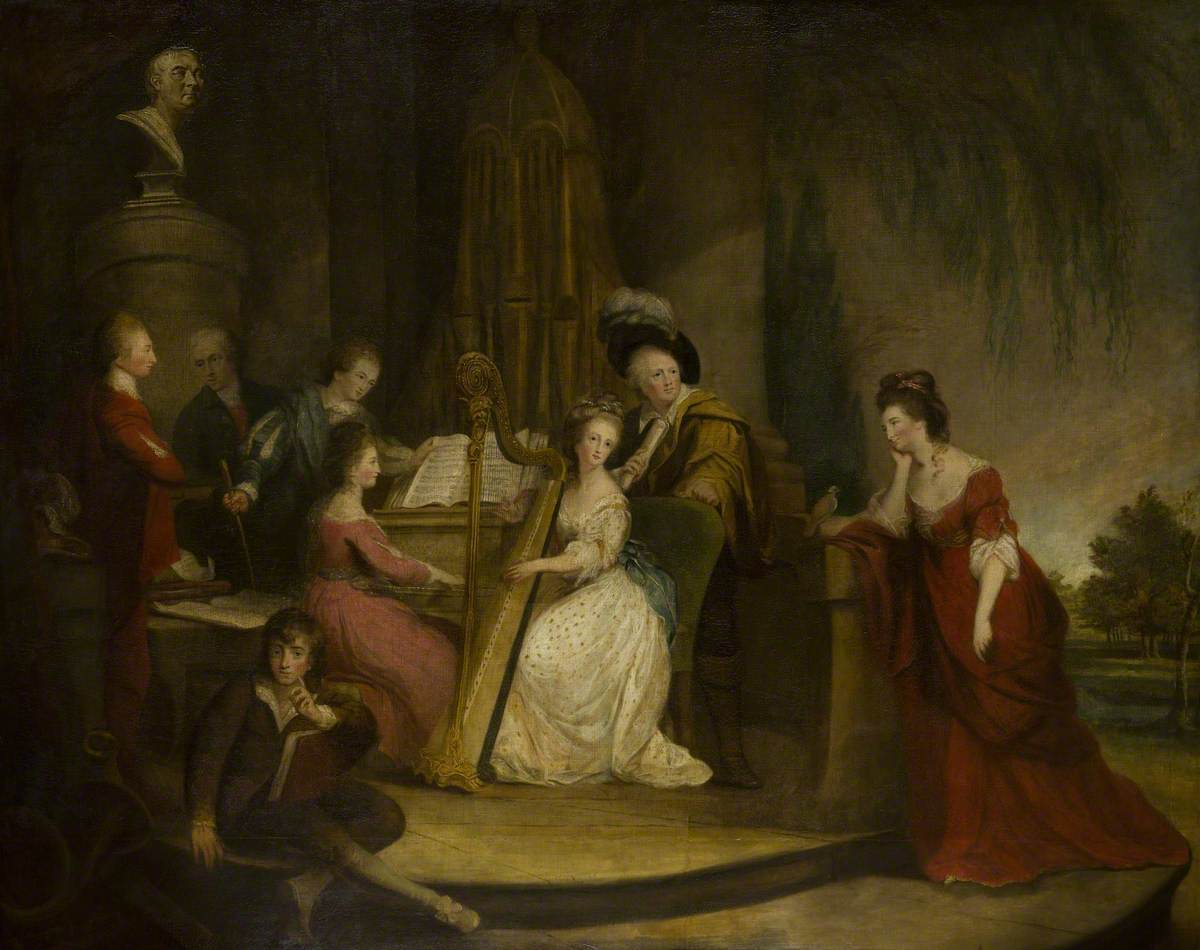
Painting of Bridgeman and his family playing music by Robert Edge Pine

Bridgeman was the second and eldest surviving son of Sir Orlando Bridgeman, 4th Baronet. His mother Anne was the daughter of Richard Newport, 2nd Earl of Bradford. He was educated at Queens' College, Cambridge, where he graduated with an MA in 1747. On the death of his maternal uncle, Thomas Newport, 4th Earl of Bradford, in 1762, Bridgeman inherited Weston Park and two years later he succeeded his father as baronet. Cambridge awarded him a Doctor of Laws in 1769 and the University of Oxford made him a Doctor of Civil Laws in 1793.

== Career ==
In 1748, Bridgeman entered the British House of Commons, having been elected for Ludlow. He represented the constituency for twenty years until 1768 and sat then for (Much) Wenlock for another twentysix years. Bridgeman retired as Member of Parliament in 1794 and was elevated the Peerage of Great Britain with the title Baron Bradford, of Bradford, in the County of Shropshire on 13 August. He was nominated clerk of the household to George, Prince of Wales, a post he held until the latter's accession in 1760. A year later he was chosen clerk comptroller of the Board of Green Cloth, serving for the following three years. In 1774 Bridgeman became recorder for Much Wenlock, an appointment for life.

== Family ==
Bridgeman married Elizabeth Simpson, daughter of Reverend John Simpson on 12 July 1755; they had eight children, five sons and three daughters. He died, aged 74, in Old Burlington Street in London in 1800 and his two oldest sons having predeceased him was succeeded in his titles by his third son Orlando, later raised to an earl. His fourth son John took over his seat in Parliament and assumed the surname Simpson. Bridgeman was survived by his widow until 1806; she died in Bath, Somerset, and was buried in Weston (Weston All Saints?).

== Notes ==
Parliament of Great Britain
Preceded by Richard Herbert; Sir William Corbet, 5th Baronet	Member of Parliament for Ludlow; 1748–1768; With: Richard Herbert 1748–1754; Edward Herbert 1754–1768	Succeeded by Edward Herbert; William Fellowes
Preceded by Cecil Forester; Brooke Forester	Member of Parliament for (Much) Wenlock; 1768–1794; With: George Forester 1768–1780, 1780–1784, 1785–1790; Thomas Whitmore 1780; John Bridgeman 1784–1785; Cecil Forester 1790–1794	Succeeded by Cecil Forester; John Simpson
Peerage of Great Britain
New creation	Baron Bradford; 1794–1800	Succeeded by Orlando Bridgeman
Baronetage of England
Preceded by Orlando Bridgeman	Baronet (of Great Lever); 1764–1800	Succeeded by Orlando Bridgeman
