= Sir Humphrey Briggs, 4th Baronet =

English Whig politician

Sir Humphrey Briggs, 4th Baronet (c. 1670 – 8 December 1734), of Haughton, Shropshire, was an English Whig politician who sat in the English and British House of Commons between 1701 and 1727.

Briggs was the eldest son of Sir Humphrey Briggs, 3rd Baronet, of Haughton and Ernstrey Park, Shropshire, and his wife, Lady Barbara (né Wyndham, daughter of Sir Wadham Wyndham of Norrington, Wiltshire). He matriculated at Wadham College, Oxford on 2 July 1687, aged 17 and was admitted at Lincoln's Inn in 1687. He succeeded his father in the baronetcy on 31 January 1699.

Briggs was elected as Whig Member of Parliament (MP) for Shropshire in the general election of February 1701. However, he was defeated in the November 1701 general election. In July 1702 he was returned unopposed as MP for Bridgnorth and was re-elected in a contest in 1705. He was returned unopposed for Bridgnorth in the 1708 general election. He supported he Whig administration, and voted for the naturalization of the Palatines in 1709 and for the impeachment of Henry Sacheverell in 1710. The 1710 British general election was dominated by the issue of the impeachment and Briggs and the other Whig Member for Bridgnorth, were narrowly defeated by two Tories in a fierce contest.

Briggs did not stand at the 1715 general election, but was returned at a by-election at Much Wenlock on 13 July 1716. He was convincingly returned for Wenlock at the 1722 general election and stood down in 1727.

Briggs died unmarried on 8 December 1734. He was succeeded in the baronetcy by his brother, Hugh.

Parliament of England
Preceded by Robert Lloyd; Sir Edward Leighton	Member of Parliament for Shropshire; 1701; With: Robert Lloyd	Succeeded by Robert Lloyd; Richard Corbet
Preceded by Roger Pope; Sir Edward Acton, Bt	Member of Parliament for Bridgnorth; 1702–1707; With: Sir Edward Acton, Bt 1702-1705; William Whitmore 1705-1707	Succeeded by Parliament of Great Britain
Parliament of Great Britain
Preceded by Parliament of England	Member of Parliament for Bridgnorth; 1707–1710; With: William Whitmore	Succeeded by Whitmore Acton; Richard Cresswell
Preceded by Thomas Newport; William Forester	Member of Parliament for Wenlock; 1716–1727; With: William Forester 1716-1722; Samuel Edwards 1722-1727	Succeeded by John Sambrooke; Samuel Edwards
Baronetage of England
Preceded by Humphrey Briggs	Baronet (of Haughton); 1699-1727	Succeeded by Hugh Briggs
