= Isaac Hawkins Browne (poet) =

English politician and poet

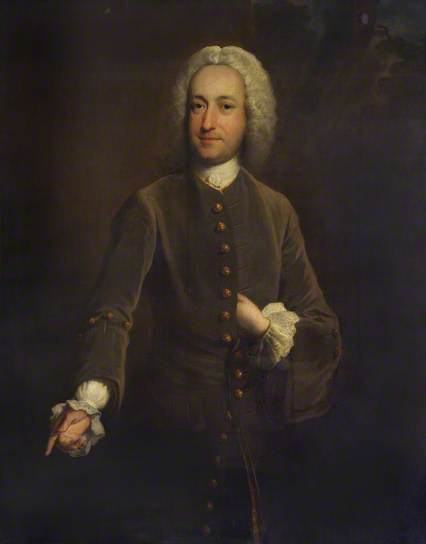
- Born: 21 January 1705; Burton-upon-Trent, Staffordshire
- Died: 14 February 1760 (aged 55); London, United Kingdom
- Occupations: barrister, poet
- Notable work: A Pipe of Tobacco

Isaac Hawkins Browne FRS (21 January 1705 – 14 February 1760) was an English politician and poet. He is remembered as the author of some clever imitations of contemporary poets Jonathan Swift and Alexander Pope on the theme of A Pipe of Tobacco (1736), somewhat analogous to the Rejected Addresses of a later day. He also wrote a Latin poem on the immortality of the soul, De Animi Immortalitate (1754).

== Life ==
He was born in Burton-upon-Trent, Staffordshire, the son of William Browne, Vicar of the parish, and Ann (née Hawkins) Browne. He was educated in Lichfield and at Westminster School. He entered Trinity College, Cambridge, in 1721 and was said to have graduated as MA, although no record of the award has been found. A country gentleman and barrister, who had been called to the bar in 1728 from Lincoln's Inn, he had great conversational powers. He was a friend of Samuel Johnson.

He was MP for Much Wenlock, Shropshire from 1744 to 1754, although he did not apparently contribute much in debates, Dr Johnson commenting that, ironically: Browne, one of the first great wits of this country, got into Parliament and never opened his mouth. He was elected a fellow of the Royal Society in February 1750.

Browne, recalled by Dr Johnson (in 1773) to have drunk hard for thirty years, died at his London home in Great Russell Street, Bloomsbury Square, on 14 February 1760.

He was memorialised at Trinity College, Cambridge chapel in 1804 with a monument sculpted by John Flaxman.

== Family ==
He married Jane Trimnell, daughter of David Trimnell, in 1744. They had one child, Isaac Hawkins Browne.

== Sources ==
- Cousin, John William (1910), "Browne, Isaac Hawkins", A Short Biographical Dictionary of English Literature, London: J. M. Dent & Sons – via Wikisource
- Chisholm, Hugh, ed. (1911). "Browne, Isaac Hawkins" . Encyclopædia Britannica (11th ed.). Cambridge University Press.
- J.M. Scott; revised W.B. Hutchings (2004). "Browne, Isaac Hawkins". Oxford Dictionary of National Biography. Vol. VIII. Oxford University Press. pp. 170–1. ISBN 0-19-861358-X.

Parliament of the United Kingdom
Preceded by Sir Brian Broughton-Delves, Bt; Brooke Forester	Member of Parliament for Wenlock; 1744 – 1754; With: Brooke Forester	Succeeded by William Forester; Brooke Forester
