= Samuel Edwards (MP) =

Samuel Edwards (c. 1668 – 1738) of Frodesley, Shropshire, was a British government official and Whig politician who sat in the House of Commons from 1722 to 1738

Edwards was the son of John Edwards of Pentre, Montgomeryshire. In 1697, he was a minor official at the Exchequer. He married Rebecca Godolphin, daughter of John Godolphin of Doctors' Commons, London on 24 November 1699 and afterwards kept a close connection with the Godolphin family. Early in 1700 he was promoted to deputy teller of the Exchequer under Francis Godolphin who was a teller of the receipt. He kept his position under subsequent holders of the office. He was appointed trustee for keeper of Windsor Great Park in 1709 and held other offices including cashier and paymaster of Exchequer bills, and director in several lotteries. He married as his second wife, Elizabeth Jones, daughter of a Shropshire clergyman in September 1723.

Edwards acquired land in Shropshire at Frodesley and on Wenlock Edge, near Wenlock. He was elected Whig Member of Parliament for Wenlock in a contest at the 1722, probably on the joint interests of William Forester and Lord Bradford. He was re-elected MP for Wenlock in 1727 and 1734. He consistently voted with the Government.

Edwards died, aged 70, on 12 June 1738,. He left two sons by his first wife of whom Godolphin was Mayor of Shrewsbury in 1730.

Parliament of Great Britain
Preceded by Sir Humphrey Briggs; William Forester	Member of Parliament for Wenlock; 1722–1738; With: Sir Humphrey Briggs 1722-1727; John Sambrooke 1727-1734; William Forester 1734-1738	Succeeded by William Forester; Brooke Forester
