= Listed buildings in Bretby =

Bretby is a civil parish in the South Derbyshire district of Derbyshire, England. The parish contains 13 listed buildings that are recorded in the National Heritage List for England. Of these, two are listed at Grade II*, the middle of the three grades, and the others are at Grade II, the lowest grade. The parish contains the village of Bretby and the surrounding countryside. The listed buildings include houses, cottages and associated structures, a farmhouse and farm buildings, a church, a former school, a former watermill, a bottle kiln and factory, a war memorial and village pump, and a telephone kiosk.

== Key ==
Grade	Criteria
II*	Particularly important buildings of more than special interest
II	Buildings of national importance and special interest

== Buildings ==
Name and location	Photograph	Date	Notes	Grade
Bretby Hall; 52.79940°N 1.55583°W		17th century	A country house that was extensively rebuilt in 1813–15 by Jeffry Wyatville, and later converted for other purposes. It is in sandstone and red brick on a chamfered plinth, with a moulded cornice, embattled parapets, and tile roofs. There are between one and four storeys, and four ranges around a rectangular courtyard. The south front is symmetrical with three storeys and seven bays flanked by four-storey circular towers. The middle bay projects and rises as a square tower with circular angle turrets, and it contains a four-centred arched entrance with side lights and a fanlight. The windows are sashes with hood moulds.	II*
Brizlincote Hall Farmhouse; 52.79563°N 1.59615°W		1707	The house is in red brick and sandstone on a chamfered plinth, with quoins, a moulded first floor band, a moulded dentilled second floor band, and a hipped tile roof. Across the top of each front is a full-width segmental pediment. There are two storeys and attics, and a north front of five symmetrical bays and a half-basement. Five semicircular steps lead up to the central doorway that has a moulded architrave and a swan-neck pediment on moulded consoles, and above the doorway is an inscription. The windows are a mix of sashes and cross windows, and in the upper floor they have alternating triangular and segmental pediments. In the attic is a central blind window with a triangular pediment, flanked by sash windows in moulded architraves with swan-neck pediments, and outside these are blind circular windows.	II*
Gate piers and wall, Brizlincote Hall Farmhouse; 52.79647°N 1.59751°W	—	Early 18th century	At the original entry to the grounds is a pair of sandstone gate piers, each with a moulded base, pilaster strips scrolled on the inner face, a moulded cornice, and a concave pyramidal cap. These are linked by low stone walls to similar end piers.	II
Outbuildings east of Brizlincote Hall Farmhouse; 52.79555°N 1.59567°W		Early 18th century	The outbuildings are in red brick with decorative brick headers, and a tile roof with a coped gable and kneelers on the right. They form a curved plan, with a two-storey cottage at the north and a barn on the south. The openings include casement windows with wedge lintels, and a cart entry with a segmental arch.	II
War memorial and pump 52.80567°N 1.56371°W		Early 18th century	The pump in the village green is contained in a panelled wooden box with a pyramidal top, and in front of it is a stone water trough. Built around it in the 20th century as a war memorial is an octagonal open timber shelter with segmental arches. It has a shingled roof and a cross finial, and inside it are inscriptions, including the names of those from the village lost in the First World War.	II
Bretby Old School; 52.80598°N 1.56364°W		1806	Two schools that were joined and altered in 1879, and later converted for residential use, the building is in red brick with hipped tile roofs. The front facing The Green has five bays. The left two bays contain a gabled porch, the middle bay projects and has two storeys and an inscribed plaque, and the right bay has one storey and attics, and two gabled dormers. In all bays are windows with four-centred arched heads.	II
Geary House; 52.79940°N 1.57466°W	—	1813	The house is in red brick on a rendered plinth, with overhanging eaves on double brackets, and a hipped tile roof. There are two storeys and a T-shaped plan, with a symmetrical front of three bays, and a long rear wing. The central doorway has a moulded architrave, and a rectangular fanlight, and the windows are sashes. In the rear wing are a doorway and windows with wedge lintels.	II
Honeysuckle Cottage and Green View; 52.80571°N 1.56431°W	—	1824	A pair of cottages in orange brick, with decorative angle pilasters, and a half-hipped tile roof. There are two storeys and two bays. In the ground floor are casement windows with flat arches and hood moulds, and the upper floor contains windows with four-centred arched heads in semicircular half-dormers with a datestone between them. On the sides are porches with Gothic arches.	II
Bretby Mill; 52.80650°N 1.54150°W	—	Early 19th century	A watermill in red brick with a stepped eaves cornice and a tile roof. There are three storeys, three bays, and a rear outshut originally holding the waterwheel. The west front contains doorways and windows with segmental heads, and in the top floor are horizontal-sliding sash windows.	II
Old School House; 52.80540°N 1.56411°W	—	Early 19th century	A pair of cottages, later combined, the building is in red brick with a tile roof, hipped at the front and gabled at the rear. The middle bay has two storeys, it projects slightly, and contains a triangular-headed casement window in the ground floor, and a flat-headed casement above. The bay is flanked by single-storey wings containing doorways and casement windows with slightly arched wedge lintels.	II
Bottle kiln and attached factory 52.79092°N 1.58482°W		Late 19th century	The bottle kiln and brick factory are in red brick with tile roofs. There are two storeys and an L-shaped plan, with the bottle kiln rising from the angle. The doors and windows have segmental heads, and there is a modern vehicle entrance. At the neck and the top of the kiln are moulded bands.	II
St Wystan's Church; 52.80627°N 1.56510°W		1877	The church is in sandstone with tile roofs, and consists of a nave, a north aisle, a south porch, a north transeptal chapel, and a chancel with a north vestry. The porch is timber framed and gabled, and has an inner doorway with a pointed head. On the west end of the nave is a square bell tower, the lower part shingled and the upper part timber framed. The sides are tapered, and it has a pyramidal roof.	II
Telephone kiosk 52.80571°N 1.56334°W		1935	The K6 type telephone kiosk on the village green was designed by Giles Gilbert Scott. Constructed in cast iron with a square plan and a dome, it has three unperforated crowns in the top panels.	II
