= Richard Herbert (Ludlow MP) =

Richard Herbert (1704–1754) was a British politician who sat in the House of Commons between 1727 and 1754. He was badly injured in a duel.

== Biography ==
Herbert was baptised on 13 December 1704, the second son of Francis Herbert of Oakley Park, Montgomeryshire, and his wife Dorothy Oldbury, daughter of John Oldbury, merchant of London. His elder brother Henry later became 1st Earl of Powis of the second creation.

Herbert was returned as Member of Parliament for Ludlow in the interest of his brother Henry at a by-election on 11 February 1727. He voted for the Administration on the civil list in 1729, but his name does not appear on other lists of that and the succeeding Parliament. He was returned unopposed in 1727 and in 1734. He was not put up as a candidate at the 1741 general election, but was returned again at a by-election on 30 December 1743. He voted for the Hanoverian troops in 1744 and 1746.

Herbert joined the army on 4 October 1745 as lieutenant-colonel. In the next year, he challenged Lord Belfield to a duel on account of a long-due debt of honour. The duel took place in the fields between Tottenham Court Road and Marylebone on Saturday 23 August 1746. Belfield was badly wounded, and Herbert received a ball in the eye which came out at the back of the skull, but nevertheless, he survived. It was said subsequently that he sometimes did not know what he was doing.

Herbert was still returned by his brother as MP for Ludlow at the 1747 general election. and was classed as a government supporter. His brother had been seeking his appointment to an official post for ten years, and in 1752 applied on his behalf to Henry Pelham for the post of clerk comptroller of the King's Household. Pelham though sympathetic pointed out that since his ‘misfortune’ he had retired from the world and had not appeared in Parliament, or even in London for a long time, and it would be difficult for the King to grant him such an appointment. Herbert was returned unopposed at the 1754 general election. After Pelham's death, his brother Thomas Pelham-Holles, 1st Duke of Newcastle tried to satisfy Herbert by offering the post of Warden of the Mint but Herbert considered it beneath his dignity unless the salary was improved. After an extra £400 p.a was offered in April 1754, Herbert took the post but did not live long to enjoy it.

Herbert died unmarried on 17 May 1754.

Parliament of Great Britain
Preceded by Abel Ketelby; Acton Baldwyn	Member of Parliament for Ludlow; 1727–1741; With: Abel Ketelby; Henry Herbert 1727	Succeeded by Henry Herbert; Sir William Corbet, Bt
Preceded by Henry Herbert; Sir William Corbet, Bt	Member of Parliament for Ludlow; 1743–1754; With: Sir William Corbet, Bt; Henry Bridgeman	Succeeded by Edward Herbert; Henry Bridgeman
