= Cecil Weld-Forester, 1st Baron Forester =

British peer and politician

The Right Honourable The Lord Forester

Member of Parliament for Wenlock
- In office 1801–1820 Serving with John Simpson
- Preceded by: Parliament of Great Britain
- Succeeded by: Francis Forester; William Lacon Childe
- In office 1790–1800 Serving with Sir Henry Bridgeman, John Simpson
- Preceded by: Sir Henry Bridgeman; George Forester
- Succeeded by: Parliament of the United Kingdom

Personal details
- Born: Cecil Forester; 7 April 1767
- Died: 23 May 1828 (aged 61) Belgrave Square, London
- Spouse: Lady Katherine Mary Manners (m. 1800; died 1828)
- Children: 9
- Education: Westminster School
- Alma mater: Christ Church, Oxford

Cecil Weld-Forester, 1st Baron Forester (baptised 7 April 1767 – 23 May 1828) was a Tory British Member of Parliament and later peer.

== Early life ==
Born Cecil Forester and baptised at St Chad's Church, Shrewsbury, he was the eldest son of Anne (née Townshend) Forester and Lt-Col. Cecil Forester, MP for Wenlock. He assumed the additional surname of Weld by Royal Licence in 1811, upon inheriting Willey Park from his cousin George Forester. Among his younger siblings were George Townshend-Forester (Recorder of Wenlock), the Rev. Townshend Forester (Prebendary of Worcester), and Maj. Francis Forester (MP for Wenlock who married Lady Louisa Vane, a daughter of the 1st Duke of Cleveland).

His paternal grandparents were William Forester, also MP for Wenlock (and son of Sir William Forester and Lady Mary Cecil, a daughter of the 3rd Earl of Salisbury), and the former Catherine Brooke. His maternal grandfather was Robert Townshend.

He was educated at Westminster School and Christ Church, Oxford.

== Career ==
He was elected to the House of Commons for Wenlock in 1790, a seat he held until 1820. The latter year he was raised to the Peerage of the United Kingdom as Baron Forester, of Willey Park in the County of Shropshire. He had initially asked to be titled as Baron Wenlock to spite the rival local Lawley family who later did take the title.

During the time of the French Revolutionary Wars, Forester was in 1800 captain of the Wenlock volunteers troops, becoming ultimately lieutenant-colonel in command in 1804. In 1813 he served as treasurer of the Salop Infirmary in Shrewsbury.

== Personal life ==
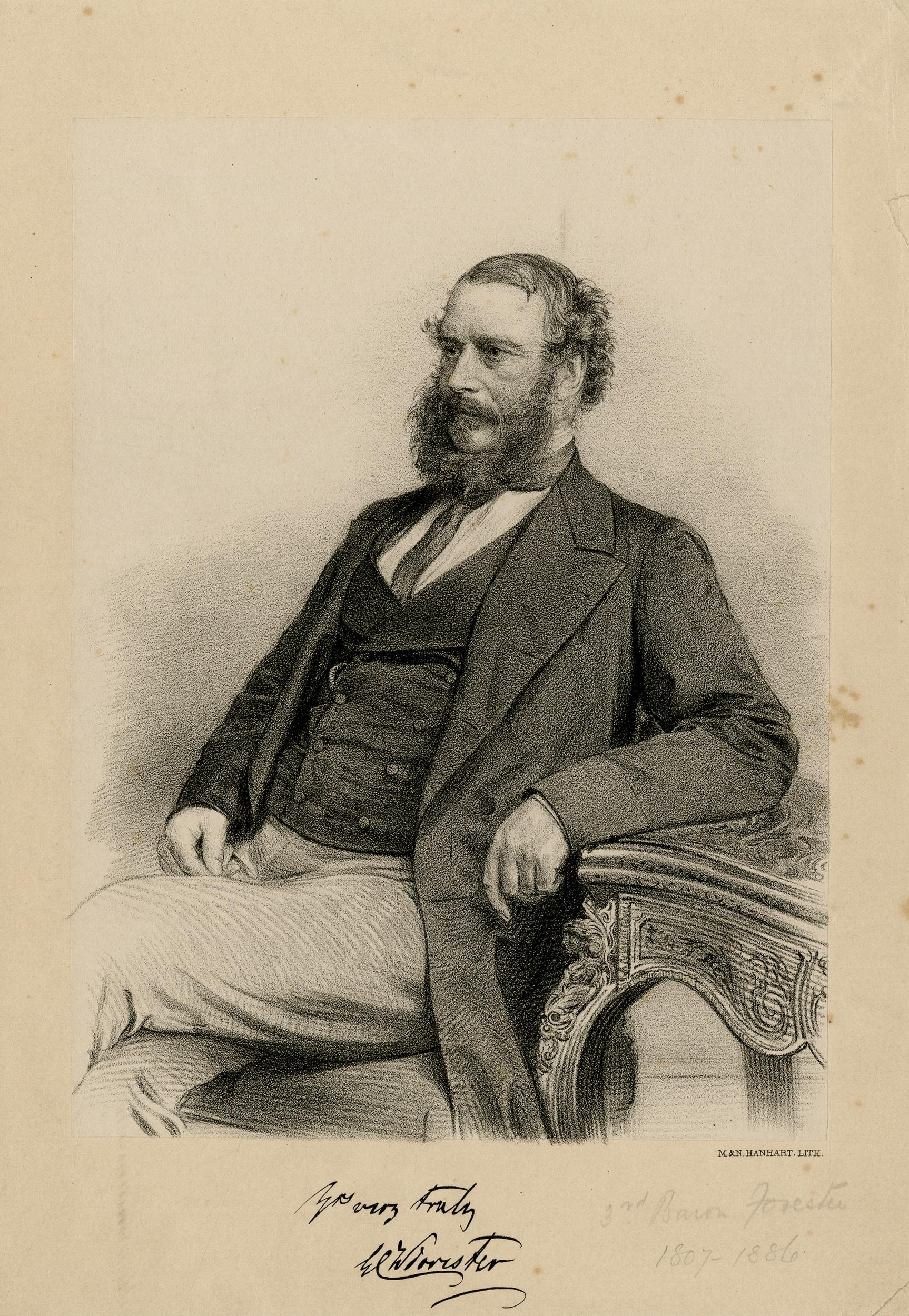
Portrait of his son, George Weld-Forester, 3rd Baron Forester, c. 1857-1870.

In 1800, Weld-Forester married Lady Katherine Mary Manners (1779–1829), daughter of Charles Manners, 4th Duke of Rutland, and Lady Mary Isabella Somerset. They had 11 children, six sons and five daughters:

- John George Weld-Forester, 2nd Baron Forester (1801–1874), who married Alexandrine, Viscountess Melbourne (née Countess von Maltzan), a daughter of Joachim Carl Ludwig, Count von Maltzan, and widow of Frederick Lamb, 3rd Viscount Melbourne.
- Hon. Anne Elizabeth Weld-Forester (1802–1885), who married George Stanhope, 6th Earl of Chesterfield, in 1830.
- Hon. Elizabeth Katherine Weld-Forester (12 November 1803 – 23 July 1832), who married Robert Carrington, 2nd Baron Carrington, in 1822.
- Hon. Isabella Elizabeth Annabella Weld-Forester (3 April 1805 – 30 December 1858), who married Maj.-Gen. Hon. George Anson, son of Thomas Anson, 1st Viscount Anson and Lady Anne Margaret Coke (a daughter of the 1st Earl of Leicester), in 1830.
- George Cecil Weld-Forester, 3rd Baron Forester (1807–1886), who married Hon. Mary Anne Jervis, a daughter of Edward Jervis, 2nd Viscount St Vincent, and widow of David Ochterlony Dyce Sombre, in 1862.
- Hon. Henrietta Maria Weld-Forester (10 December 1809 – 22 April 1841), who married Albert Denison, 1st Baron Londesborough, son of Gen. Henry Conyngham, 1st Marquess Conyngham, in 1833.
- Hon. Charles Robert Weld-Forester (28 December 1811 – 16 September 1852), who married Lady Maria Jocelyn, daughter of Robert Jocelyn, 3rd Earl of Roden and Hon. Maria Stapleton (a daughter of the 12th Baron le Despencer), in 1848.
- Orlando Watkin Weld Weld-Forester, 4th Baron Forester (1813–1894), a Reverend who married Sophia Elizabeth Norman, daughter of Richard Norman, in 1840. After her death in 1872 he married Emma Maria Tollemache, daughter of William Tollemache, in 1875.
- Col. Hon. Emilius John Weld-Forester (10 February 1815 – 29 January 1899), 13th Light Infantry; died unmarried
- Hon. Selina Louisa Weld-Forester (1819–1894), who married Orlando Bridgeman, 3rd Earl of Bradford in 1844.
- Lt.-Col. Hon. Henry Townshend Weld-Forester (21 January 1821 – 5 May 1897), Grenadier Guards, died unmarried

He died of gout at Belgrave Square, London in 1828, aged 61, and was buried at Willey parish church. His tomb was sculpted by John Carline. He was succeeded in the barony by his eldest son John George Weld-Forester. Lady Forester died in 1829. His daughters Anne and Selina were leaders of fashionable society, and both were intimate friends of Benjamin Disraeli. It was often said that Disraeli in his last years was in love with Selina, but since she was not free to marry, he proposed to the widowed Lady Anne instead, in the hope of remaining close to both sisters.

=== Descendants ===
Through his youngest daughter, Hon. Selina Louisa Weld-Forester, he was a grandfather of Lady Florence Bridgeman, wife of Henry Lascelles, 5th Earl of Harewood, and mother to his great-grandson, Henry Lascelles, 6th Earl of Harewood, through whom Lord Forester's descendants would be in the British line of succession to the throne through his descendant Princess Alice, Duchess of Gloucester, and Mary, Princess Royal and Countess of Harewood.

Parliament of Great Britain
| Preceded by Sir Henry Bridgeman; George Forester | Member of Parliament for Wenlock; 1790–1800; With: Sir Henry Bridgeman 1790–1794; John Simpson 1794–1800 | Succeeded by Parliament of the United Kingdom |
Parliament of the United Kingdom
| Preceded by Parliament of Great Britain | Member of Parliament for Wenlock; 1801–1820; With: John Simpson | Succeeded by Francis Forester; William Lacon Childe |
Peerage of the United Kingdom
| New creation | Baron Forester; 1820–1828 | Succeeded by John Weld-Forester |
