= George Stanhope, 6th Earl of Chesterfield =

British politician, courtier and race horse owner (1805-1866)

The Right Honourable The Earl of Chesterfield PC
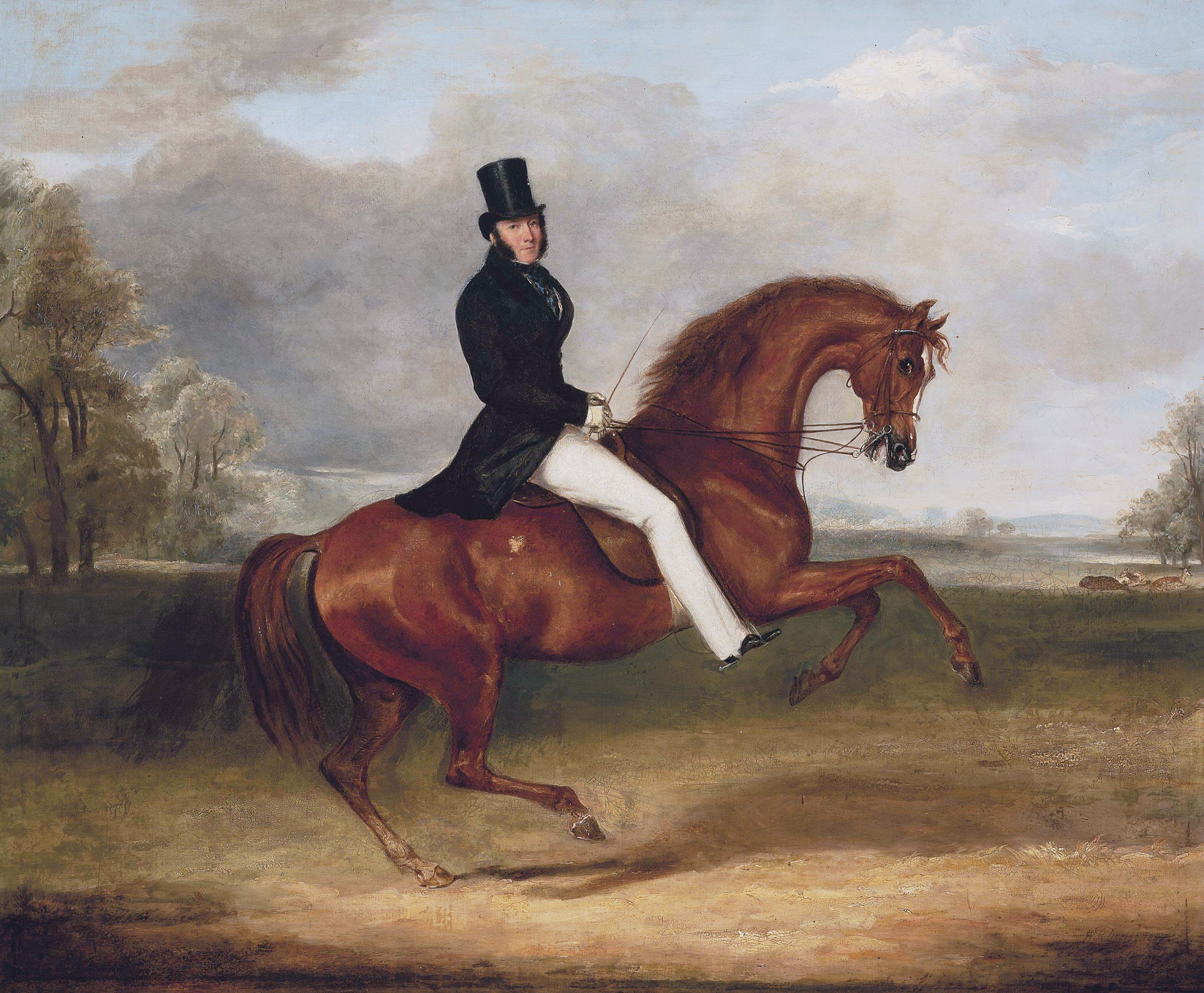
- George Augustus Frederick, 6th Earl of Chesterfield, on his favourite hack by Sir Hercules

Master of the Buckhounds
- In office 30 December 1834 – 8 April 1835
- Monarch: William IV
- Prime Minister: Sir Robert Peel
- Preceded by: The Earl of Lichfield
- Succeeded by: The Earl of Erroll

Personal details
- Born: 23 May 1805
- Died: 1 June 1866 (aged 61)
- Party: Tory
- Spouse: Hon. Anne Elizabeth Weld-Forester (m. 1830)
- Children: George Stanhope, 7th Earl of Chesterfield; Evelyn Herbert, Countess of Carnarvon
- Parents: Philip Stanhope, 5th Earl of Chesterfield; Lady Henrietta Thynne
- Education: Eton College; Christ Church, Oxford

George Augustus Frederick Stanhope, 6th Earl of Chesterfield, PC (23 May 1805 – 1 June 1866), styled Lord Stanhope until 1815, was a British Tory politician, courtier and race horse owner. He served as Master of the Buckhounds under Sir Robert Peel from 1834 to 1835.

== Early life ==
Chesterfield was the son of Philip Stanhope, 5th Earl of Chesterfield, and his wife, Lady Henrietta Thynne, daughter of Thomas Thynne, 1st Marquess of Bath.

He was educated at Eton and Christ Church, Oxford.

== Career ==
He succeeded his father in the earldom in 1815 at the age of ten and later took his seat on the Tory benches in the House of Lords. He served briefly in the Tory administration of Sir Robert Peel as Master of the Buckhounds from December 1834 to April 1835 and was sworn of the Privy Council in December 1834.

He was commissioned as Captain of the Burton-on-Trent Troop of the Staffordshire Yeomanry on 29 November 1828, but resigned in 1830.

=== Horse racing ===
Lord Chesterfield had a great passion for horse racing and spent most of his early years indulging in that pursuit. Although he had some success on the turf, winning the Oaks twice, his victories were not frequent enough to pay for the large string of horses he had in training or to finance his lifestyle of lavish party-giving and gambling. His racing colours of red cap and jacket with blue sleeves were also carried to victory by Tom Olliver in the 1843 Grand National aboard his horse Vanguard. In 1840, after the success of Crucifix, he decided to give up his expensive mode of living and retire to Bretby Hall. He did construct a gallop of two miles (3.2 km) to exercise his horses. Many eminent people visited Bretby to try out their horses or for shooting in Bretby Park. Among them were the Earl of Wilton, the Earl of Londesborough, Lord Newport, and Sir Henry des Voeux. The best jockeys also came to Bretby.

== Personal life ==
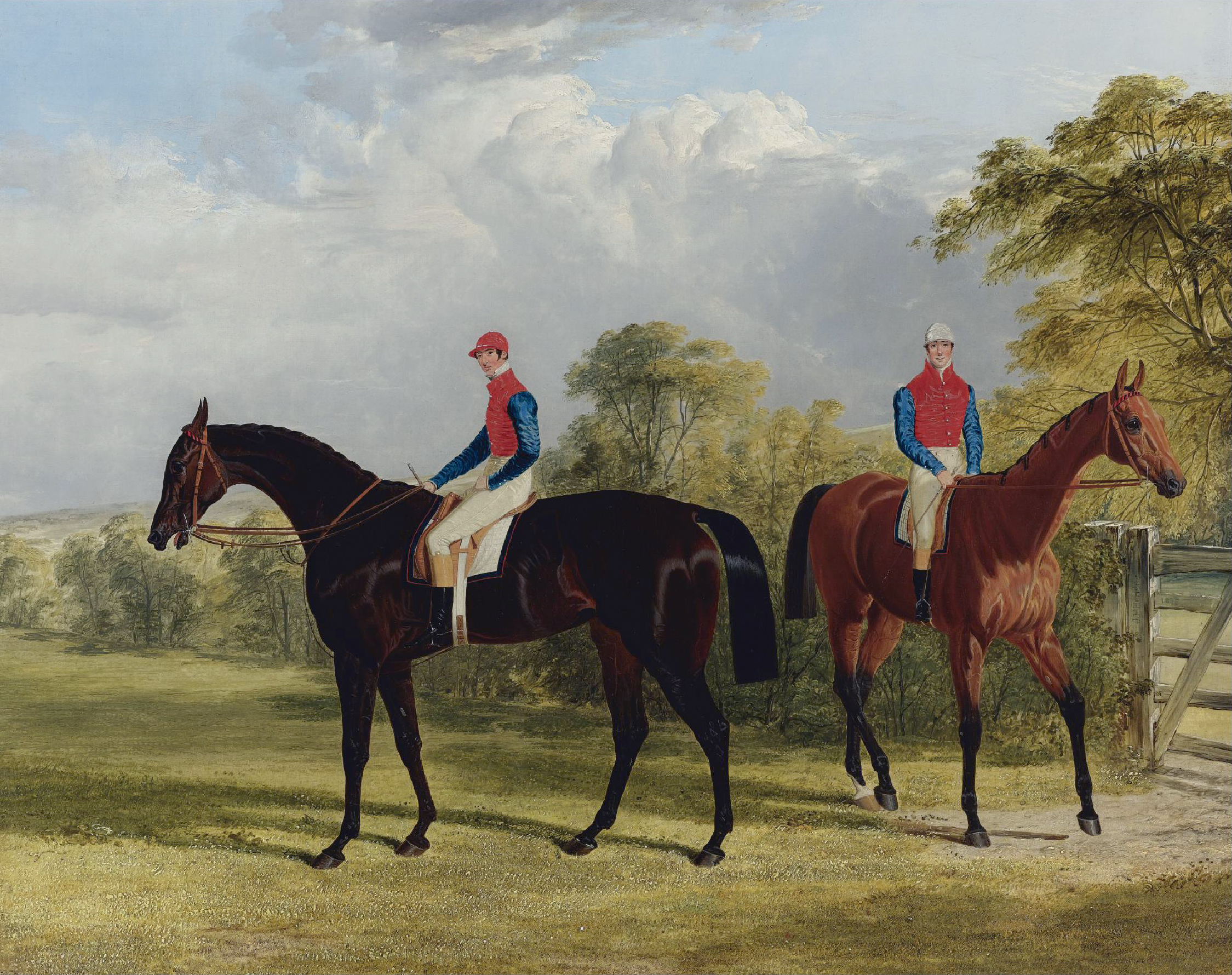
Two of the earl's horses in 1838; on the left Industry, who won the Oaks that year, on the right Caroline Elvina, who also ran in the Oaks but was unplaced. She was sold to the emperor of Russia (John Frederick Herring, Sr., 1838)

In 1830, Lord Chesterfield married the Hon. Anne Elizabeth Weld-Forester (1802–1885), eldest daughter of Cecil Weld-Forester, MP, later the 1st Baron Forester, and Lady Katherine Manners (a daughter of the 4th Duke of Rutland). Her family home was Willey Park in Shropshire. Together, George and Anne were the parents of one son and one daughter:

- George Stanhope, 7th Earl of Chesterfield (1831–1871), who died unmarried of typhoid fever.
- Lady Evelyn Stanhope (1834–1875), who married Henry Herbert, 4th Earl of Carnarvon.

Lord Chesterfield died in June 1866, aged 61, and was succeeded in the earldom by his only son, George. The Countess of Chesterfield died in July 1885, aged 82. Like her sister Selina, Countess of Bradford, she was an intimate friend of Benjamin Disraeli. After they had both been widowed Disraeli is said to have proposed to her, but she declined on the ground that people over seventy just look foolish when they decide to marry. Some of their friends thought that she refused him because she believed that he cared more for her sister Selina.

== See also ==
- Chesterfield coat

Political offices
Preceded by The Earl of Lichfield	Master of the Buckhounds; 1834–1835	Succeeded by The Earl of Erroll
Peerage of England
Preceded by Philip Stanhope	Earl of Chesterfield; 1815–1866	Succeeded by George Philip Cecil Arthur Stanhope
