= George Weld-Forester, 3rd Baron Forester =

British Conservative politician and army officer (1807–1886)

General The Right Honourable The Lord Forester PC
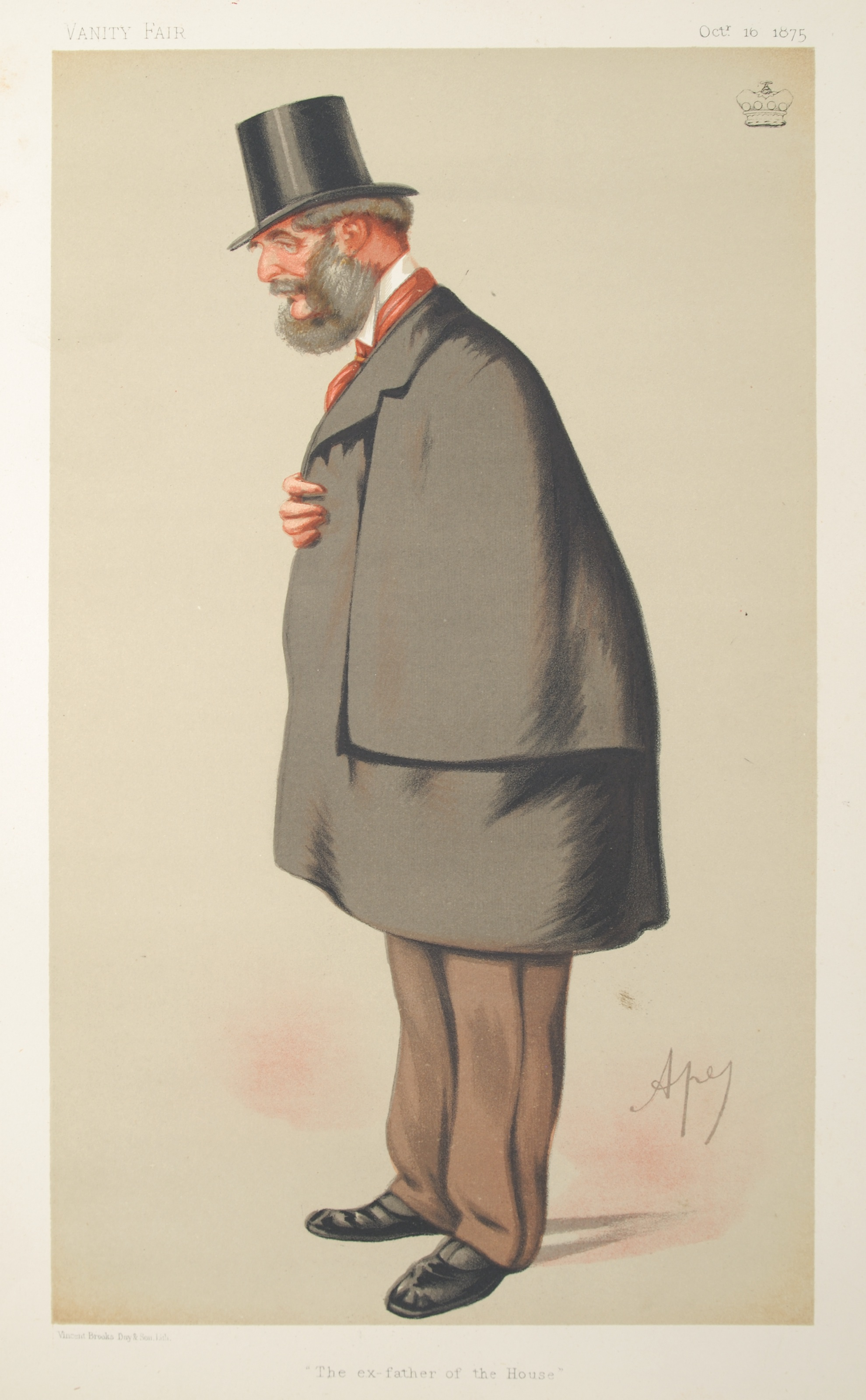
- Caricature of Lord Forester by "Ape" (Carlo Pellegrini) published in Vanity Fair in 1875

Comptroller of the Household
- In office 27 February 1852 – 17 December 1852
- Monarch: Victoria
- Prime Minister: The Earl of Derby
- Preceded by: The Earl of Mulgrave
- Succeeded by: Viscount Drumlanrig
- In office 26 February 1858 – 11 June 1859
- Monarch: Victoria
- Prime Minister: The Earl of Derby
- Preceded by: Viscount Castlerosse
- Succeeded by: Lord Proby

Personal details
- Born: 10 May 1807
- Died: 14 February 1886 (aged 78)
- Party: Conservative
- Spouse(s): Hon. Mary Anne Jervis (d. 1893)

George Cecil Weld-Forester, 3rd Baron Forester, PC (10 May 1807 – 14 February 1886), styled The Honourable George Weld-Forester between 1821 and 1874, was a British Conservative politician and army officer. He notably served as Comptroller of the Household in 1852 and from 1858 to 1859. A long-standing MP, he was the Father of the House of Commons from 1873 to 1874, when he succeeded his elder brother in the barony and took a seat in the House of Lords.

== Early life ==
Weld-Forester, born at Sackville Street, London was the second son of Cecil Weld-Forester, 1st Baron Forester, and Lady Katherine Mary Manners, daughter of Charles Manners, 4th Duke of Rutland. His elder brother John Weld-Forester, 2nd Baron Forester, was also a Tory politician Both the brothers had, as godfather at the same christening, the Prince of Wales, later King George IV, a personal friend of their father.

He was educated at Westminster School.

== Career ==
Weld-Forester entered the British Army on commission in 1824, he was a Captain of the Royal Horse Guards and was recorded residing at the Hyde Park Barracks the night of the 1841 census. He later became Lieutenant-Colonel of the Royal Horse Guards in 1853. He was promoted to staff rank as Major-General in 1863 and Lieutenant-General in 1871, retiring, aged seventy, as full General in 1877 but saw no campaign service.

=== Political career ===
Weld-Forester succeeded his brother as member of parliament for Wenlock in 1828, a seat he would hold for 46 years. He had been Groom of the Bedchamber to William IV from 1830 to 1831 and served in the first two Conservative administrations of the Earl of Derby as Comptroller of the Household between February and December 1852 and from 1858 to 1859. He was admitted to the Privy Council in 1852. In 1873 he became Father of the House of Commons as the longest-serving member (then 45 years) of the House. The following year he succeeded his elder brother as third Baron Forester and entered the House of Lords. In 1878 he served as treasurer of the Salop Infirmary in Shrewsbury.

== Personal life ==
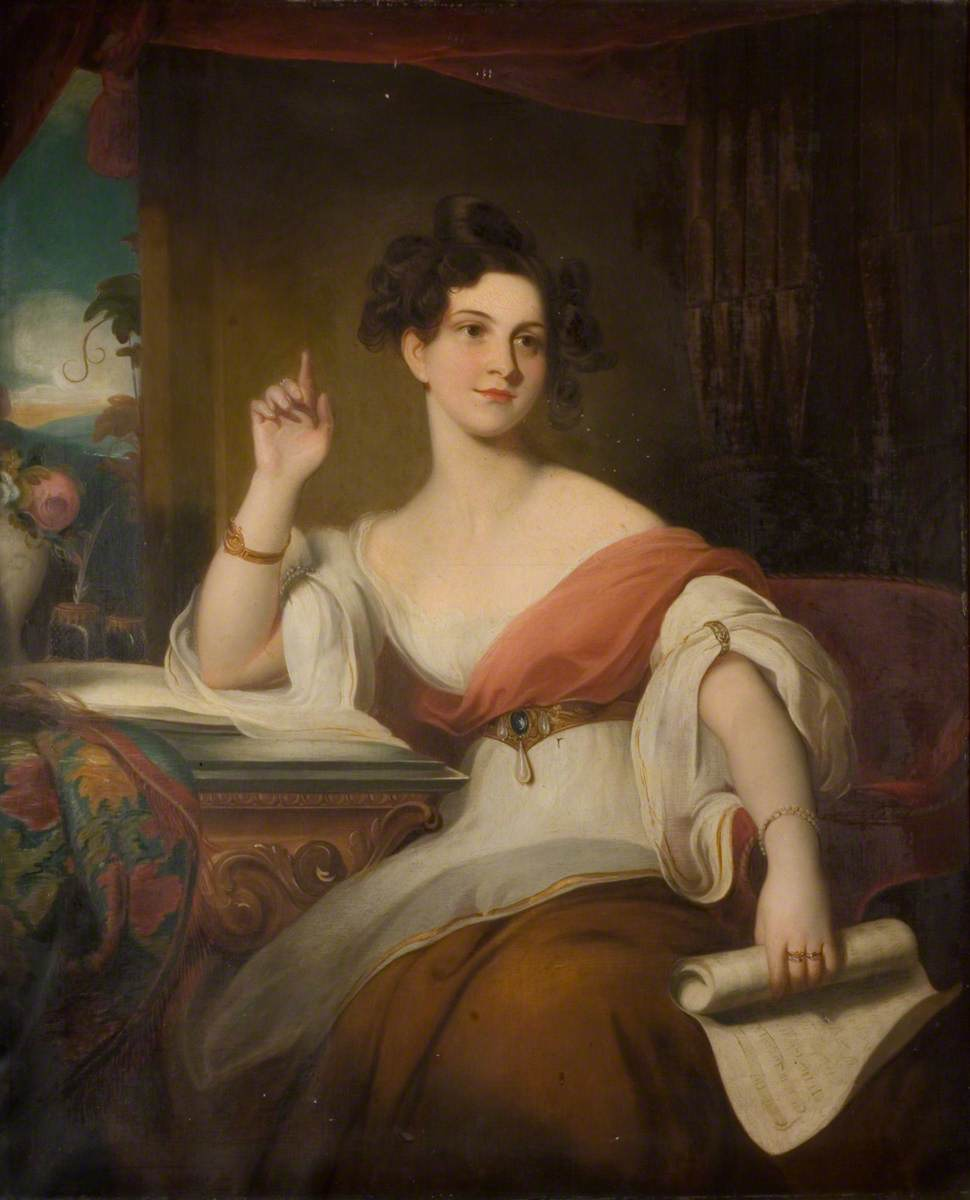
Portrait of Mary Anne Jervis, Lady Forester, after James Godsell Middleton, 1834

Lord Forester married the Honourable Mary Anne Jervis, daughter of Edward Jervis, 2nd Viscount St Vincent, and widow of David Ochterlony Dyce Sombre, in 1862. They had no children.

Lord Forester died at 3 Carlton Gardens, London, in February 1886, aged 78, and was buried at Willey parish church. He was succeeded in the barony by his younger brother, Reverend Orlando Weld-Forester. Lady Forester died in March 1893.

The Lady Foresters Convalescent Home in Llandudno was opened in Lord Forester's honour in 1902.

Parliament of the United Kingdom
Preceded by Hon. John Weld-Forester; Paul Thompson	Member of Parliament for Wenlock; 1828–1874; With: Paul Thompson 1828–1832; James Milnes Gaskell 1832–1868; Alexander Hargreaves Brown 1868–1874	Succeeded by Alexander Hargreaves Brown; Cecil Weld-Forester
Preceded by Hon. Henry Lowry-Corry	Father of the House of Commons; 1873–1874	Succeeded by Christopher Rice Mansel Talbot
Political offices
Preceded by The Earl of Mulgrave	Comptroller of the Household; 1852	Succeeded by Viscount Drumlanrig
Preceded by Viscount Castlerosse	Comptroller of the Household; 1858–1859	Succeeded by Lord Proby
Peerage of the United Kingdom
Preceded by John Weld-Forester	Baron Forester; 1874–1886	Succeeded by Orlando Weld-Forester
