= 1874 Wenlock by-election =

UK Parliamentary by-election

← 1874 (GE)	12 November 1874	1880 →

Constituency of Wenlock
- Registered: 3,541
- Turnout: 88.1% (▼4.6%)
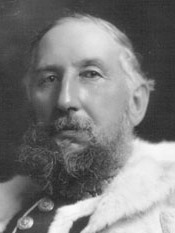
	First party	Second party
		Lib
Candidate	Cecil Weld-Forester	Beilby Lawley
Party	Conservative	Liberal
Popular vote	1,720	1,401
Percentage	55.1%	44.9%
MP before election
George Weld-Forester
Conservative
Elected MP
Cecil Weld-Forester
Conservative

The 1874 Wenlock by-election was fought on 12 November 1874. The by-election was fought due to the succession to a peerage of the incumbent Conservative MP, George Weld-Forester. It was won by the Conservative candidate Cecil Weld-Forester.

1874 Wenlock by-election
Party	Candidate	Votes	%	±%
Conservative	Cecil Weld-Forester	1,720	55.1	−6.8
Liberal	Beilby Lawley	1,401	44.9	+6.8
Majority		319	10.2	+6.9
Turnout		3,121	88.1	−4.6
Registered electors		3,541		
Conservative hold		Swing	-6.8	
