= Bretby Hall =

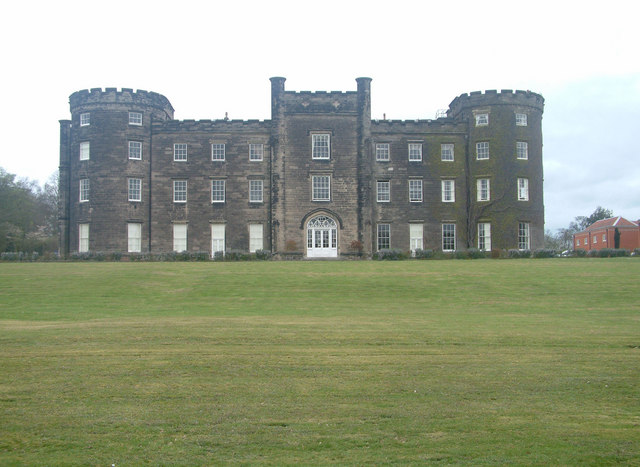

- Location within Derbyshire
- 52.79924°N 1.55797°W
- Location: Bretby, England
- OS grid reference: SK297527

History
- Built: 1630
- Built for: Thomas Stanhope
- Rebuilt: 1812

Site notes
- Architect: Sir Jeffry Wyatville

Listed Building – Grade II

Bretby Hall is a country house at Bretby, Derbyshire, England, north of Swadlincote and east of Burton upon Trent on the border with Staffordshire. It is a Grade II listed building. The name Bretby means "dwelling place of Britons".

== History ==
The first Bretby Hall was built in 1630 after Thomas Stanhope bought the manor of Bretby from the family of Stephen de Segrave, to whom it had been granted by Ranulph de Blondeville, 4th Earl of Chester.

In 1628, his grandson Philip was made Earl of Chesterfield by King Charles I of England. From then on, Bretby Hall was the ancestral home of the Earls of Chesterfield.

The second Earl was responsible for a complete restyling of the gardens so that some compared them favourably with the gardens at Versailles.

The fifth Earl demolished the mansion and built the present Hall (c.1812) to a design by Sir Jeffry Wyatville.

The sixth Earl, known as the "racing Earl", loved cricket and shooting, so he built a cricket pitch and raised game birds.

Following the death of the seventh Earl in 1871, the Estate passed to his widowed mother, Anne Elizabeth, Dowager Countess of Chesterfield, who was a close friend of Benjamin Disraeli. On the death of the Countess, her estates devolved upon Lord Porchester, the eldest son of her daughter, Evelyn (died 1875), who had married Henry Herbert, 4th Earl of Carnarvon in 1861. The 5th Earl of Carnarvon, the famous egyptologist for whom Howard Carter discovered the tomb of Tutankhamun, commenced breaking up the Bretby estate during World War I. The Carnarvons never lived at Bretby Park, preferring their home at Highclere Castle, near Newbury, Berkshire. They did make regular visits, however, particularly for shooting. The main estate was sold to John Downing Wragg, a Swadlincote industrialist. The proceeds helped to fund Carter's search for the tomb of Tutankhamen in Egypt in the early 1920s.

== Bretby Hall today ==
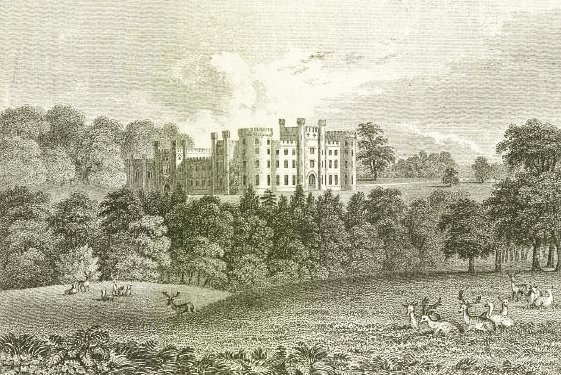
Bretby Hall ca 1850

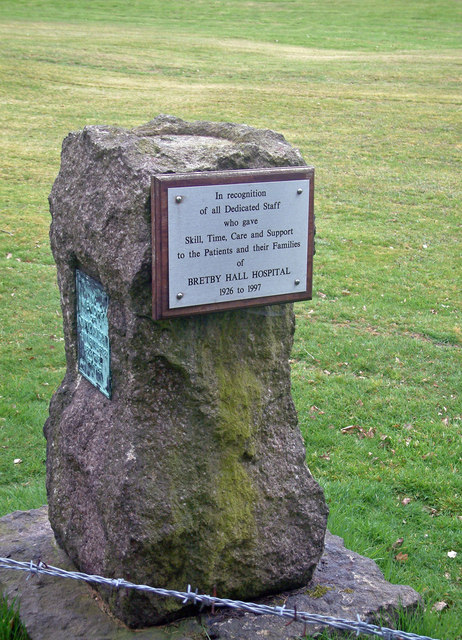
Monument for Bretby Hall Hospital

In 1926, the Hall was sold to Derbyshire County Council and was run as Bretby Hall Hospital until 28 February 1997. It opened as a sanatorium to treat children but became an orthopaedic centre.

The hall was sold to a private developer and converted to luxury apartments and suites.

See https://www.bretbyhall.com

== See also ==
- Grade II* listed buildings in South Derbyshire
- Listed buildings in Bretby
