= Elizabeth Somerset, Duchess of Beaufort =

English duchess (c. 1713-1799)

Her Grace The Duchess of Beaufort
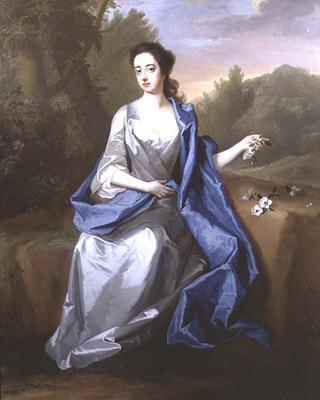
- Elizabeth Somerset, née Berkeley, Duchess of Beaufort, painting attributed to Michael Dahl
- Born: 1713
- Died: 1799 (aged 85–86)
- Spouse: Charles Noel Somerset, 4th Duke of Beaufort
- Issue: 6
- Father: John Symes Berkeley
- Mother: Elizabeth Norborne

Elizabeth Somerset, Duchess of Beaufort (née Berkeley; c. 1713 – 9 April 1799) was an English Duchess.

== Biography ==
Somerset was born in Stoke Gifford in Gloucestershire to John Symes Berkeley and Elizabeth Norborne. Her younger brother was Norborne, Lord Botetourt.

On 1 May 1740 she married Charles Noel Somerset, 4th Duke of Beaufort, younger son of Henry Somerset, 2nd Duke of Beaufort and his second wife Rachel Noel. They had six children:

1. Lady Anne Somerset (11 March 1741 – 18 May 1763, aged 22), married Charles Compton, 7th Earl of Northampton on 13 September 1759 and had issue
2. Lady Elizabeth Somerset (12 March 1742 – 7 May 1760, aged 18)
3. Henry Somerset, 5th Duke of Beaufort (16 October 1744 – 11 October 1803, aged 58)
4. Lady Rachel Somerset (August 1746 – May 1747) (died an infant)
5. Lady Henrietta Somerset (26 April 1748 – 24 July 1770, aged 22), married Sir Watkin Williams-Wynn, 4th Baronet on 6 April 1769, no issue.
6. Lady Mary Isabella Somerset (1 August 1756 – 2 September 1831, aged 75), married Charles Manners, 4th Duke of Rutland on 26 December 1775 and had six children.

A stone monument to the memory of her daughter Lady Elizabeth Somerset is located in Stoke Park, Bristol. It is engraved with the Latin inscription:

ELIZABETHA SOMERSET
CAROLI DUCIS BEAUFORT FILIA SECUNDA HIC OBIIT VII
MAII MDCCLX
RESTITUTUM ANNO MMIV

This translates as 'Elizabeth Somerset, second daughter of Charles Duke of Beaufort, died here 7 May 1760. Restored in the year 2004'. She was killed when her horse shied.
