= George Forester =

George Forester (21 December 1735 – 13 July 1811) was Member of Parliament for the borough constituency of Wenlock on several occasions between 1758 and 1785.

He was the only son of Brooke Forester of Dothill in Wellington and Elizabeth daughter and heir of George Weld of Willey Park. He died unmarried in 1811 having devised his estates to his cousin Cecil Forester, from 1811 Weld-Forester, and from 1820 1st Baron Forester.

Parliament of Great Britain
Preceded by William Forester; Brooke Forester	Member of Parliament for Wenlock; 1758–1761; With: Brooke Forester	Succeeded by Cecil Forester; Brooke Forester
Preceded by Brooke Forester; Cecil Forester	Member of Parliament for Wenlock; 1768–1780; With: Henry Bridgeman	Succeeded by Henry Bridgeman; Thomas Whitmore
Preceded by Thomas Whitmore; Henry Bridgeman	Member of Parliament for Wenlock; 1780–1784; With: Henry Bridgeman	Succeeded by John Bridgeman (later Simpson); Henry Bridgeman
Preceded by John Bridgeman (later Simpson); Henry Bridgeman	Member of Parliament for Wenlock; 1785–1790; With: Henry Bridgeman	Succeeded by Cecil Forester; Henry Bridgeman
