= Charles Somerset, 4th Duke of Beaufort =

British politician

His Grace The Duke of Beaufort
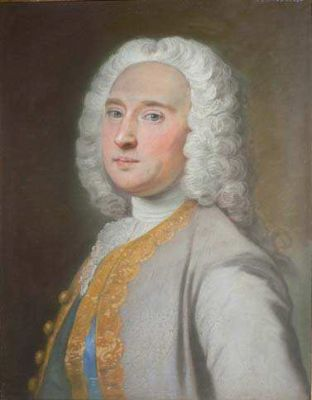
- Charles Noel Somerset, 4th Duke of Beaufort painted by William Hoare at an unknown time.
- Born: 12 September 1709
- Died: 28 October 1756 (aged 47)
- Spouse: Elizabeth Berkeley (m. 1740)
- Issue: Henry Somerset, 5th Duke of Beaufort; Lady Anne Somerset; Lady Elizabeth Somerset; Lady Rachel Somerset; Lady Mary Isabella Somerset; Lady Henrietta Somerset
- Father: Henry Somerset, 2nd Duke of Beaufort
- Mother: Lady Rachel Noel

Charles Noel Somerset, 4th Duke of Beaufort (12 September 1709 – 28 October 1756) was a British Tory politician who sat in the House of Commons from 1731 until 1745 when he succeeded to the peerage as Duke of Beaufort.

== Life ==
Somerset was the younger son of Henry Somerset, 2nd Duke of Beaufort and his second wife, Rachel Noel. He was educated at Winchester College and matriculated as University College, Oxford on 19 June 1725, being awarded MA on 16 October 1727.

Somerset was a High Tory and 'a most determined and unwavering Jacobite.' He was returned as Member of Parliament for Monmouthshire his family's seat at a by-election on 17 May 1731. At the 1734 British general election, he transferred to Monmouth. He adopted a traditional Tory line in Parliament, which included voting against the repeal of the Test Act in 1736; this demonstrates the complexity of the English Jacobite movement, which was staunchly anti-Catholic, yet in theory supported a Catholic monarchy.

Somerset was returned again for Monmouth at the 1741 British general election. The era was dominated by the Whigs under the premiership of Robert Walpole with the Tories excluded from power. In February 1742, Walpole was finally ousted by a coalition of Tories, Patriot Whigs who opposed his foreign policy and members of the 'Prince's Party,' a group of younger politicians, most notably William Pitt who associated themselves with Frederick, Prince of Wales. However, to the fury of their Tory allies, the Patriot Whigs did a deal with their Whig colleagues to shut them out of the new government, while in 1744, the Tory leader the Earl of Gower joined the so-called Broad Bottom ministry and Somerset assumed leadership of the party. However, the government simply ignored him and continued to treat Gower as the Tory leader when negotiating the award of offices.

Somerset became Duke of Beaufort on the death of his brother, Henry Scudamore, 3rd Duke of Beaufort in February 1745. He vacated his seat in the House of Commons and took his seat in the House of Lords. His brother had been one of those who contacted the French government in late 1742 asking for their support for an invasion to restore the Stuarts. Beaufort himself also joined the project, sending assurances of support to the French in August 1745, and pressing a month later 'for a body of troops to be landed near London.' Simon Fraser, Lord Lovat, executed for his part in the 45 Rebellion later declared 'if the Duke of Beaufort had not promised to raise £12,000, he would not have concerned himself' but as with many aristocratic Jacobite sympathisers, the Government took no action against Beaufort. Beaufort was a member of the Loyal Brotherhood, and became its president in 1746.

One of the complexities of 18th-century politics was the hostility between Hanoverian monarchs and their heirs; as George II supported the Whigs, his son Frederick, Prince of Wales described himself as a Tory even though many of them were in theory Jacobites. Since the Prince's 'programme' effectively amounted to ousting the current incumbents, Beaufort agreed to support him and in May 1749, Horace Walpole reported his presence at a meeting 'between the Prince's party and the Jacobites.' In September 1750, Beaufort and Lord Westmorland jointly presided at a meeting of English Jacobites held during Charles Stuart's secret visit to London in September 1750, which effectively signalled the last flicker of the Jacobite movement.

Beaufort died on 28 October 1756 and was buried in the family vault at Badminton, Gloucestershire; a contemporary described him as 'a man of sense, spirit and activity, unblameable in his morals, but questionable in his political capacity'. His wife Elizabeth died on 9 April 1799.

== Family ==
On 1 May 1740, he married Elizabeth Berkeley, sister of Norborne Berkeley, 4th Baron Botetourt.

The couple had one son and five daughters:

1. Lady Anne Somerset (11 March 1741 – 18 May 1763), married Charles Compton, 7th Earl of Northampton on 13 September 1759 and had issue
2. Lady Elizabeth Somerset (12 March 1742 – 7 May 1760)
3. Henry Somerset, 5th Duke of Beaufort (1744–1803), his heir and successor
4. Lady Rachel Somerset (August 1746 – May 1747)
5. Lady Henrietta Somerset (26 April 1748 – 24 July 1770), married Sir Watkin Williams-Wynn, 4th Baronet on 6 April 1769, without issue
6. Lady Mary Isabella Somerset (1 August 1756 – 2 September 1831), married Charles Manners, 4th Duke of Rutland on 26 December 1775 and had issue

Parliament of Great Britain
Preceded by Sir William Morgan; John Hanbury	Member of Parliament for Monmouthshire; 1731–1734; With: John Hanbury	Succeeded by John Hanbury; Thomas Morgan
Preceded by Edward Kemeys	Member of Parliament for Monmouth; 1734–1745	Succeeded by Sir Charles Kemeys-Tynte, Bt
Peerage of England
Preceded by Henry Scudamore	Duke of Beaufort; 1745–1756	Succeeded by Henry Somerset
