= Lady Mary Isabella Somerset =

British aristocrat and society hostess (1756-1831)

Mary Manners, Duchess of Rutland
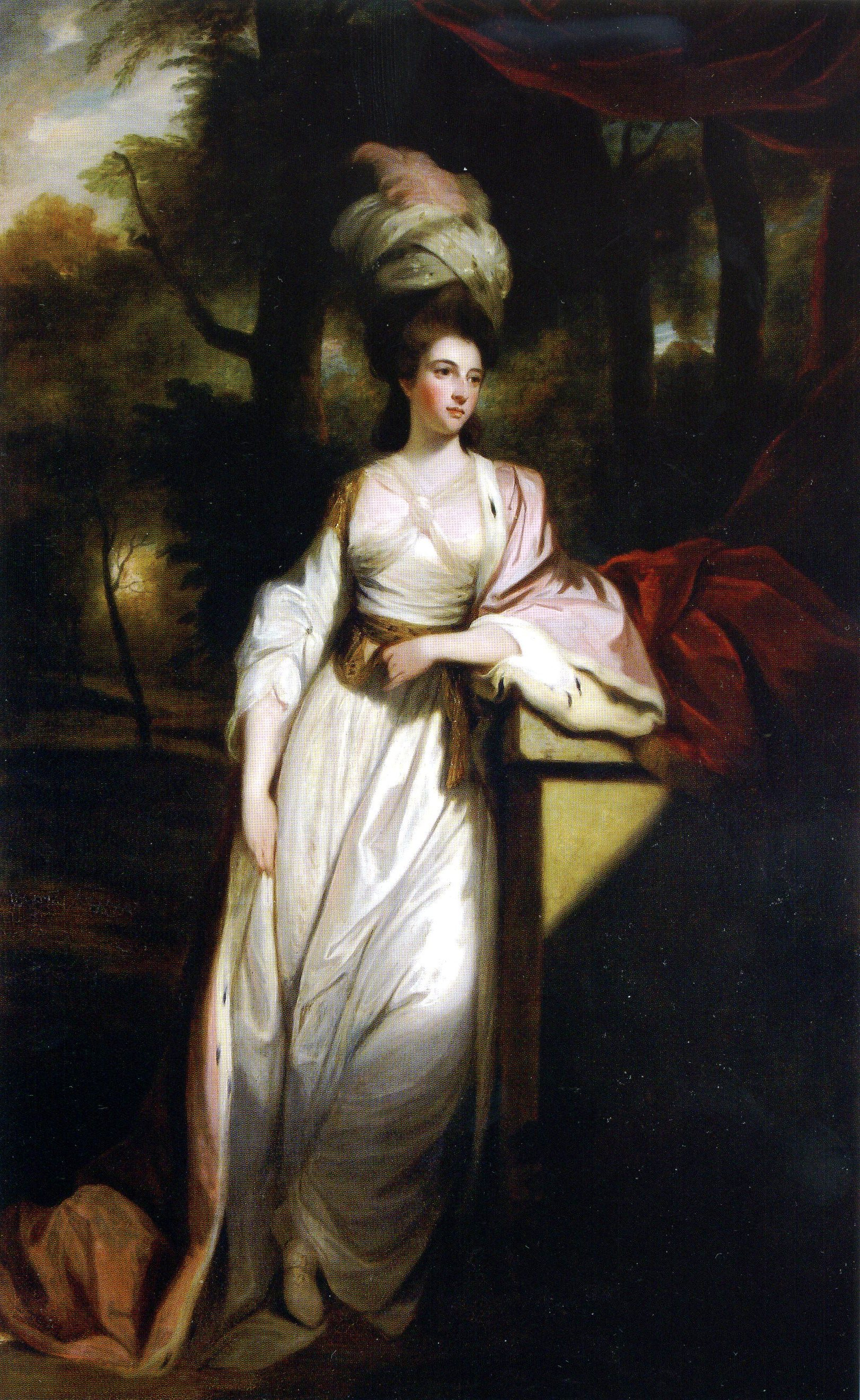
- Born: 1 August 1756
- Died: 2 September 1831 (aged 75); London
- Spouse: Charles Manners, 4th Duke of Rutland (m. 1775; died 1787)

Mary Isabella Manners, Duchess of Rutland (born Lady Mary Somerset; 1 August 1756 – 2 September 1831) was a British aristocrat and society hostess.

== Life ==
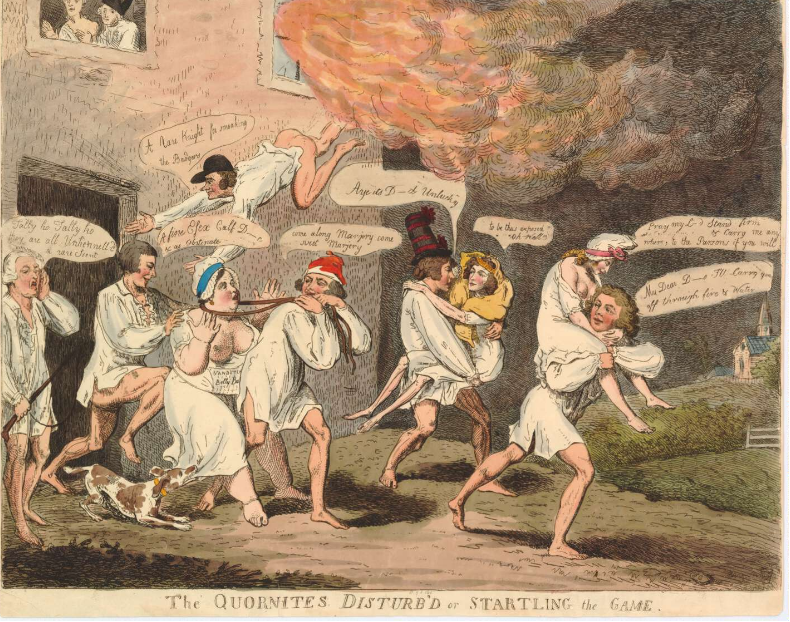
"The Quornites disturb'd" or "Startling the game" by Isaac Cruikshank

Rutland was born in 1756. Her mother was the heiress Elizabeth Berkeley and her father was Charles Somerset, 4th Duke of Beaufort. Her father died in 1756 so her elder brother Henry Somerset became the 5th Duke of Beaufort. He was about twelve at the time.

On 26 December 1775, she married Charles Manners, 4th Duke of Rutland. She was known for her beauty and as a society host. The writer Nathaniel Wraxall thought her the most beautiful woman in England. Sir Joshua Reynolds painted her portrait four times. Charles and Mary had six children, two daughters and four sons. Her daughters were Lady Elizabeth Isabella Manners and Lady Katherine Mary Manners. The former married Richard Norman and the latter married Cecil Weld-Forester, 1st Baron Forester in 1780. One of their sons, Lord William Robert Albanac Manners died when he was about ten in 1783. The other three were John Henry Manners, 5th Duke of Rutland (1778–1857), General Lord Charles Henry Somerset Manners (24 October 1780 – 25 May 1855) and Major-General Lord Robert William Manners (14 December 1781 – 15 November 1835)

Her husband died in 1787 and her nine-year-old son inherited the Dukedom. She was protective of his interests and active on behalf of others. She used her influence on Pitt, the Prime Minister, at a time before the 1830 Reform Bill. She would send Pitt letters appealing to Pitt's party's electoral prospects in order that her candidate could achieve some contract or position.

In 1791 she featured in a caricature by Isaac Cruikshank which showed various "Quornites" in "amorous conflagration" as they are forced to leave their burning building thus "Startling the game". All are dishevelled and Rutland is being carried by "Lord P_g_t" to which she is saying that he can carry her anywhere including "to the Parsons if you will".

In 1795 she was the target of a James Gilray caricature that showed her and her daughter Lady Elizabeth or Lady Katherine. They are both wearing fashionable turbans and large ostrich feathers but the much taller figure is Rutland - the celebrated beauty and society hostess. Her daughter is shown in a simpler gown with huge feathers that are trying to mitigate her shorter stature.

Rutland died in London in 1831.
