= Dothill =

District in the north-western part of Telford, England

Coordinates: 52.710779°N 2.526390°W

Dothill is a small district in the north-western part of Telford, England. It is located to the north-west of Wellington, one of the old towns that form a part of the modern-day new town of Telford.

The area of Dothill used to be the home of the Forester family, including Sir William Forester, in the 17th century. Nowadays, Dothill is mainly a residential area, having been built up in the 1960s and 1990s. The main housing estate in Dothill is the Brooklands Estate, as well as the Harley Close Estate, which was built up in the 1990s. Dothill also has its own infant and primary schools and its own secondary school, the Charlton School, which in 2016, relocated to a new site on the vacant Blessed Robert Johnson Catholic College in Apley Avenue. However, this is still within the Dothill Area.

There are also some recreational countryside areas and a pool, called Dothill Pool, which is home for wildlife such as ducks and locally famous swans. Nearby areas include Wellington, Admaston, Shawbirch and Apley. Dothill is also close to The Princess Royal Hospital, which is located in the neighbouring area, Apley. There is also a row of shops in the Brooklands estate, consisting of a convenience store, hair salon, charity shop, spa, fish-bar and a butcher's shop. There is also a Co-operative Food store located near the Charlton School.

Dothill also had two blocks of flats, Apley Court and Haughmond Court (demolished 2016). These tower blocks overlooked Wellington, Apley, Shawbirch and other nearby areas. Apley Court was proposed for demolition and redevelopment in 2020.

There is also a footbridge located near the old Charlton School. This footbridge goes over the A5223 (Whitchurch Drive) providing access from Dothill to Apley Woods.
