= William Forester (1690–1758) =

English landowner and Whig politician

William Forester (1690 – 12 November 1758), of Dothill in Wellington, Shropshire was an English landowner and Whig politician who sat in the House of Commons in three Parliaments between 1715 and 1758.

== Early life ==
Forester was the son of Sir William Forester of Dothill Park, Shropshire and his wife, Lady Mary, daughter of James Cecil, 3rd Earl of Salisbury. He married Catherine Brooke, the daughter and heiress of William Brooke of Clerkenwell in 1714. The family had a significant political interest at Wenlock and members of the family represented the borough in Parliament over several centuries. Forester inherited the interest on the death of his father in 1718.

== Career ==
At the 1715 general election, Forester was returned unopposed as Whig Member of Parliament for Wenlock in succession to his father. He voted with the Government on all recorded occasions. During the crisis of the South Sea Bubble, he was found to have been credited with £1,000 stock, but could show that he had paid for it. He did not stand at the 1722 general election, nor in 1727 when he returned his brother-in-law John Sambrooke. He was returned unopposed for Wenlock at the 1734 general election and voted consistently with the administration except when he abstained on the Spanish convention in 1739. He brought in his son Brooke in 1739 and did not stand at the 1741 general election when he returned his son-in-law instead.

Forester was returned unopposed again at the 1754 general election, but does not appear to have spoken or voted in that Parliament.

== Death and legacy ==
During his ownership of Dothill Park, Forester considerably enhanced the gardens. He died on 12 November 1758. He and his wife had four children:

- Brooke Forester
- Lt. Col. Cecil Forester
- Mary, who married Sir Brian Broughton-Delves, 4th Baronet
- Martha, who married F. T. Blithe

After Forester's death, the Dothill gardens reverted to grass and the estate went to ruin. The house was demolished in 1960 and the park built upon.

Parliament of Great Britain
Preceded by Sir William Forester; Richard Newport	Member of Parliament for Wenlock; 1715–1722; With: Thomas Newport 1715–16; Sir Humphrey Briggs, 4th Baronet 1716–22	Succeeded by Samuel Edwards; Sir Humphrey Briggs, 4th Baronet
Preceded by John Sambrooke; Samuel Edwards	Member of Parliament for Wenlock; 1734–1741; With: Samuel Edwards 1734–39; Brooke Forester 1739–41	Succeeded by Sir Brian Broughton-Delves, Bt; Brooke Forester
Preceded by Isaac Hawkins Browne; Brooke Forester	Member of Parliament for Wenlock; 1754–1758; With: Brooke Forester	Succeeded by George Forester; Brooke Forester
