= William Forester (1655–1718) =

Sir William Forester KB (10 December 1655 – February 1718), of Dothill Park, Apley Castle, and Watling Street in Wellington, Shropshire was a Whig politician who sat in the English and British House of Commons between 1679 and 1715.

== Early life ==
Forester was the eldest surviving son of Francis Forester of Dothill and his wife, Lady Mary Newport, a daughter of Richard Newport, 1st Baron Newport, of High Ercall, and widow of John Steventon of Dothill Park.

He entered Trinity College, Cambridge in 1673 and graduated as MA in 1675.

== Career ==
He succeeded to Dothill Park in about 1675 under the will of his half-brother Richard Steventon (died 1659) and this became the main family seat at least until his grandson obtained Willey Park by marrying the heiress of George Weld.

Forester was Member of Parliament for the borough constituency of Wenlock from 1679 to 1685. In 1683 he was almost implicated in the Rye House Plot against Charles II, when a search revealed 50 muskets and pike heads were found hidden in an oven, and a large quantity of gunpowder buried on his estate. He paid off a heavy fine, allegedly helped by selling off valuable timber grown on the Wrekin. He was an opponent of Charles' successor James II, suffering a spell of imprisonment in the Tower of London after the Monmouth Rebellion, and being exiled in Holland until he returned to England accompanying William III in 1688. He was invested as a Knight Companion of the Order of the Bath in 1689. He was returned as MP for Wenlock at the 1689 English general election and was granted a sinecure place as Clerk of the Green Cloth in 1689, which he held to 1717. He was returned for Wenlock again at the 1690 English general election and sat until 1715.

In May 1695, Forester fought a duel against fellow MP, Colonel Beaumont (who disarmed Forester), over accusations made in the House of Commons. In August 1703 he was one of the commissioners sent by Queen Anne to receive the Archduke Charles of Austria at The Hague.

== Personal life ==
In 1684, he married Mary, a daughter of James Cecil, 3rd Earl of Salisbury, with whom he had two sons and three daughters. One son was another William Forester who also sat for Wenlock, while one of his daughters, Mary, married Sir George Downing, 3rd Baronet (the latter, nephew of his wife, having been brought up in Forester's household).

Forester died in 1718, aged 62, and was buried at Wellington.

Parliament of England
Preceded by Sir Thomas Littleton, Bt; George Weld	Member of Parliament for Wenlock; 1679–1685; With: Sir John Weld 1679; John Wolryche 1679–85	Succeeded by Thomas Lawley; George Weld
Preceded by Thomas Lawley; George Weld	Member of Parliament for Wenlock; 1689–1707; With: George Weld 1689–01; George Weld (younger) 1701–07	Succeeded by Parliament of Great Britain
Parliament of Great Britain
Preceded by Parliament of England	Member of Parliament for Wenlock; 1707–1715; With: George Weld (younger) to 1708; Thomas Weld 1708–10; George Weld 1710–13; William Whitmore 1713–14; Richard Newport 1714–15	Succeeded by William Forester; Thomas Newport
