= Willey, Shropshire =

Village in Shropshire, England

Coordinates: 52.589°N 2.484°W

Willey
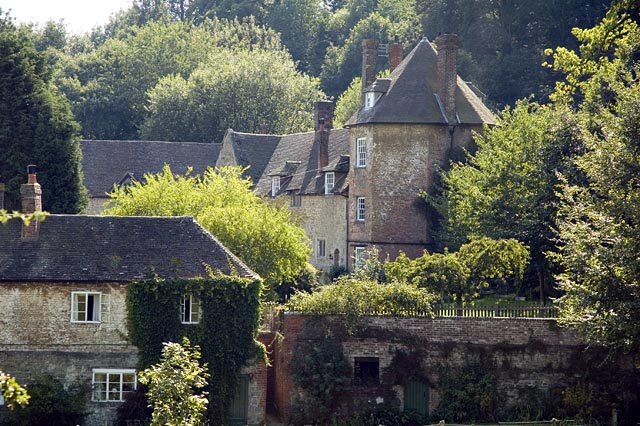
- Willey Old Hall

- Location within Shropshire
- OS grid reference: SO672991
- Civil parish: Barrow
- Unitary authority: Shropshire
- Ceremonial county: Shropshire
- Region: West Midlands
- Country: England
- Sovereign state: United Kingdom
- Post town: BROSELEY
- Postcode district: TF12
- Dialling code: 01952
- Police: West Mercia
- Fire: Shropshire
- Ambulance: West Midlands
- UK Parliament: Ludlow

Willey is a small village in the civil parish of Barrow, south west of the town of Broseley, Shropshire, England. It is made up of about 4 farms and the majority of land is owned and leased by the Weld-Forester family of Willey Hall. Willey also sports a proud cricket team like many small villages around the United Kingdom.

== History ==
In the early 16th century, Willey became the property of the Weld family. John Weld, second son of John Weld of Eaton, Cheshire and his wife Joanna FitzHugh, settled in the area and became patriarch of the Willey Welds. His youngest brother was Sir Humphrey Weld (died 1610), Lord Mayor of London. The Welds of Shropshire were several times connected by marriage with the Whitmores of Apley Hall, Shropshire.

The village was the site of one of John Wilkinson's ironworks in the 18th century. The world's first iron boat, a barge, was built there in 1787.

In 1951 the civil parish had a population of 136. On 1 April 1966 the parish was abolished and merged with Barrow and Dawley.

=== MPs for Much Wenlock ===
The Welds returned several Members of Parliament for Much Wenlock where they had industrial interests, starting with George Weld, replaced by his father, Sir John Weld (died 1681) and again George Weld (died 1701). They were second cousins of Humphrey Weld (of Lulworth) (1612-1685) MP for Christchurch. George Weld's successor was his son, George (1674-1748), another Wenlock MP. He was succeeded by his daughter, Elizabeth, who married Brooke Forester, a further Wenlock MP.

Her successor to Willey was George Forester, their son and Wenlock MP. He was childless and on his death, his cousin, Cecil Forester, later created Baron, assumed the additional surname of Weld by Royal Licence in 1811, and inherited Willey.

== Places of interest ==
Although the 17th-century Old Hall itself has been demolished, what remains is the domestic range of buildings occupying two sides of a quadrangle. They are in stone, and have two storeys with attics, and four gabled bays, the third bay containing a carriage arch. To the north of the range is an octagonal brick tower with three storeys and a conical tiled roof. The landscaped grounds of the Old Hall, Willey Park, contain a war memorial in form of a stone Celtic cross, originally erected by the 6th Baron Forester, to the men of the parishes of Barrow and Willey who died serving in the World Wars.

The Church of England parish church at Willey, the family burial place of the Lords Forester, is maintained by the Forester family but is no longer open for regular worship nor open to the public except by arrangement with the estate office or when the church, with the Willey Park gardens, is opened under the National Gardens Scheme.

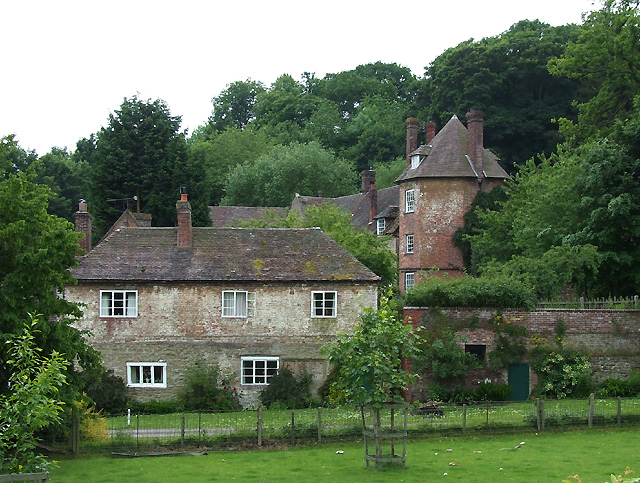
Willey Old Hall, domestic buildings.

== See also ==
- Listed buildings in Barrow, Shropshire
