= (Much) Wenlock (constituency) =

Parliamentary constituency in the United Kingdom, 1801–1885

Much Wenlock
- Former borough constituency for the House of Commons

1468–1885
- Replaced by: Ludlow

Much Wenlock, often called simply Wenlock, was a constituency of the House of Commons of the Parliament of England until 1707, then of the Parliament of Great Britain from 1707 to 1800, and finally of the Parliament of the United Kingdom from 1801 to 1885, when it was abolished. It was named after the town of that name in Shropshire.

The seat was founded in 1468 as a borough constituency and was represented throughout its history by two burgesses.

== Boundaries ==
Much Wenlock's constituency boundaries ran from Leighton to just west of Dawley, to Ironbridge, and finally to just east of Madeley along the northern border; travelling eastwards, the boundaries ran from just east of Madeley to the bend in the River Severn, following the river thereafter. The far southern border, commencing in the east, travelled along the southern part of the Severn across to Easthope; the western border, running northwards, going from Easthope through to Benthall, and onwards back to Leighton.

== Members of Parliament ==
- Constituency created (1468)

Parliament	First member	Second member
1510–1523	No names known	
1529	John Foster	Edward Hall
1536	?	
1539	?	
1542	William Blount	Reginald Corbet
1545	Richard Cornwall	Richard Lawley
1547	Richard Lawley	Thomas Lawley
1553 (Mar)	John Herbert	Thomas Lawley
1553 (Oct)	Richard Lee	Robert Eyton
1554 (Apr)	Thomas Foster	Edward Lacon
1554 (Nov)	Sir George Blount	John Evans
1555	Sir George Blount	Thomas Ridley
1558	Sir George Blount	George Bromley
1558–9	Roland Lacon	George Bromley
1562–3	Sir George Blount	Charles Foxe
1571	William Lacon	Thomas Eyton
1572	Sir George Blount	Thomas Lawley
1584	Thomas Lawley	William Baynham
1586	Thomas Lawley	William Baynham
1588	William Baynham	Robert Lawley
1593	William Baynham	Sir John Poole
1597	William Baynham, died and replaced by Thomas Fanshawe	William Lacon
1601	John Brett	William Leighton
1604	Robert Lawley	George Lawley
1614	Rowland Lacon	Edward Lawley
1621	Sir Edward Lawley	Thomas Wolryche
1624	Henry Mytton	Thomas Wolryche
1625	Thomas Lawley	Thomas Wolryche
1626	Thomas Lawley	Francis Smallman
1628	Thomas Lawley	George Bridgmant
1629–1640	No Parliaments summoned	

Year	First member	First party	Second member	Second party
1640 (Apr)	Sir Thomas Littleton		Richard Cresset	
1640 (Nov)	William Pierrepont		Sir Thomas Littleton	
1645	William Pierrepont		Humphrey Bridges	
1653, 1654, 1656	Much Wenlock excluded from Barebones and 1st & 2nd Protectorate Parliaments			
1659	Thomas Whitmore		Sir Francis Lawley	
1660	Sir Francis Lawley		Thomas Whitmore	
1661	Sir Thomas Littleton, Bt		George Weld	
Feb 1679	Sir John Weld		William Forester	
Aug 1679	John Wolryche		William Forester	
1685	Thomas Lawley		George Weld	
1689	Sir William Forester		George Weld	
1701	Sir William Forester		George Weld	
1708	Sir William Forester		Thomas Weld	
1710	Sir William Forester		George Weld	
1713	Sir William Forester		William Whitmore	
1714	Sir William Forester		Richard Newport	
1715	Thomas Newport		William Forester II	
1716	Sir Humphrey Briggs		William Forester II	
1722	Sir Humphrey Briggs		Samuel Edwards	
1727	John Sambrooke		Samuel Edwards	
1734	William Forester II		Samuel Edwards	
1739	William Forester II		Brooke Forester	
1741	Sir Brian Broughton-Delves, Bt		Brooke Forester	
1744	Isaac Hawkins Browne		Brooke Forester	
1754	William Forester II		Brooke Forester	
1758	George Forester		Brooke Forester	
1761	Cecil Forester		Brooke Forester	
1768	Sir Henry Bridgeman	Tory	George Forester	Tory
Sept. 1780	Sir Henry Bridgeman	Tory	Thomas Whitmore	Tory
Dec. 1780	Sir Henry Bridgeman	Tory	George Forester	Tory
1784	Sir Henry Bridgeman	Tory	John Bridgeman (later Simpson)	Tory
1785	Sir Henry Bridgeman	Tory	George Forester	Tory
1790	Sir Henry Bridgeman	Tory	Cecil Forester (from 1811 Weld-Forester)	Tory
1794	John Simpson	Tory	Cecil Forester (from 1811 Weld-Forester)	Tory
1820	Francis Forester	Tory	William Lacon Childe	Tory
1826	John Weld-Forester	Tory	Paul Thompson	Whig
1828	George Weld-Forester	Tory	Paul Thompson	Whig
1832	George Weld-Forester	Tory	James Milnes Gaskell	Tory
1834	George Weld-Forester	Conservative	James Milnes Gaskell	Conservative
1868	George Weld-Forester	Conservative	Alexander Brown	Liberal
1874	Cecil Weld-Forester	Conservative	Alexander Brown	Liberal

- Constituency abolished (1885)

== Election results ==
=== Elections in the 1830s ===
Weld-Forester was appointed Groom of the Bedchamber to William IV, requiring a by-election.

By-election, 20 February 1830: Wenlock
Party	Candidate	Votes	%
Tory	George Weld-Forester	Unopposed	
Tory hold			

General election 1830: Wenlock
Party	Candidate	Votes	%
Tory	George Weld-Forester	Unopposed	
Whig	Paul Thompson	Unopposed	
Registered electors		c. 500	
Tory hold			
Whig hold			

General election 1831: Wenlock
Party	Candidate	Votes	%
Tory	George Weld-Forester	Unopposed	
Whig	Paul Thompson	Unopposed	
Registered electors		c. 500	
Tory hold			
Whig hold			

General election 1832: Wenlock
Party	Candidate	Votes	%
Tory	George Weld-Forester	448	41.3
Tory	James Milnes Gaskell	330	30.4
Radical	Matthew Bridges	308	28.4
Majority		22	2.0
Turnout		635	91.9
Registered electors		691	
Tory hold			
Tory gain from Whig			

General election 1835: Wenlock
Party	Candidate	Votes	%	±%
Conservative	George Weld-Forester	519	41.1	−0.2
Conservative	James Milnes Gaskell	422	33.4	+3.0
Whig	William Somerville	323	25.6	−2.8
Majority		99	7.8	+5.8
Turnout		c. 632	c. 78.1	c. −13.8
Registered electors		809		
Conservative hold		Swing	+0.6	
Conservative hold		Swing	+2.2	

General election 1837: Wenlock
Party	Candidate	Votes	%
Conservative	George Weld-Forester	Unopposed	
Conservative	James Milnes Gaskell	Unopposed	
Registered electors		906	
Conservative hold			
Conservative hold			

=== Elections in the 1840s ===
General election 1841: Wenlock
Party	Candidate	Votes	%	±%
Conservative	George Weld-Forester	Unopposed		
Conservative	James Milnes Gaskell	Unopposed		
Registered electors		961		
Conservative hold				
Conservative hold				

Gaskell was appointed a Lord Commissioner of the Treasury, requiring a by-election.

By-election, 14 September 1841: Wenlock
Party	Candidate	Votes	%	±%
Conservative	James Milnes Gaskell	Unopposed		
Registered electors		949		
Conservative hold				

General election 1847: Wenlock
Party	Candidate	Votes	%	±%
Conservative	George Weld-Forester	Unopposed		
Conservative	James Milnes Gaskell	Unopposed		
Registered electors		857		
Conservative hold				
Conservative hold				

=== Elections in the 1850s ===
Weld-Forester was appointed Comptroller of the Household, requiring a by-election.

By-election, 3 March 1852: Wenlock
Party	Candidate	Votes	%	±%
Conservative	George Weld-Forester	Unopposed		
Conservative hold				

General election 1852: Wenlock
Party	Candidate	Votes	%	±%
Conservative	George Weld-Forester	Unopposed		
Conservative	James Milnes Gaskell	Unopposed		
Registered electors		905		
Conservative hold				
Conservative hold				

General election 1857: Wenlock
Party	Candidate	Votes	%	±%
Conservative	George Weld-Forester	Unopposed		
Conservative	James Milnes Gaskell	Unopposed		
Registered electors		871		
Conservative hold				
Conservative hold				

Gaskell was appointed Comptroller of the Household, requiring a by-election.

By-election, 3 March 1858: Wenlock
Party	Candidate	Votes	%	±%
Conservative	James Milnes Gaskell	Unopposed		
Conservative hold				

General election 1859: Wenlock
Party	Candidate	Votes	%	±%
Conservative	George Weld-Forester	Unopposed		
Conservative	James Milnes Gaskell	Unopposed		
Registered electors		881		
Conservative hold				
Conservative hold				

=== Elections in the 1860s ===
General election 1865: Wenlock
Party	Candidate	Votes	%	±%
Conservative	George Weld-Forester	Unopposed		
Conservative	James Milnes Gaskell	Unopposed		
Registered electors		961		
Conservative hold				
Conservative hold				

General election 1868: Wenlock
Party	Candidate	Votes	%	±%
Conservative	George Weld-Forester	Unopposed		
Liberal	Alexander Brown	Unopposed		
Registered electors		3,445		
Conservative hold				
Liberal gain from Conservative				

=== Elections in the 1870s ===
General election 1874: Wenlock
Party	Candidate	Votes	%	±%
Conservative	George Weld-Forester	1,708	41.4	N/A
Liberal	Alexander Brown	1,575	38.1	N/A
Conservative	Charles Milnes Gaskell	846	20.5	N/A
Turnout		3,283 (est)	92.7 (est)	N/A
Registered electors		3,541		
Majority		133	3.3	N/A
Conservative hold		Swing	N/A	
Majority		729	17.6	N/A
Liberal hold		Swing	N/A	

Forester succeeded to the peerage, becoming Lord Forester and causing a by-election.

1874 Wenlock by-election
Party	Candidate	Votes	%	±%
Conservative	Cecil Weld-Forester	1,720	55.1	−6.8
Liberal	Beilby Lawley	1,401	44.9	+6.8
Majority		319	10.2	+6.9
Turnout		3,121	88.1	−4.6
Registered electors		3,541		
Conservative hold		Swing	-6.8	

=== Elections in the 1880s ===
General election 1880: Wenlock
Party	Candidate	Votes	%	±%
Liberal	Alexander Brown	2,058	46.5	+8.4
Conservative	Cecil Weld-Forester	1,358	30.7	−10.7
Conservative	Ralph Augustus Benson	1,013	22.9	+2.4
Majority		700	15.8	−1.8
Turnout		3,244 (est)	93.2 (est)	+0.5
Registered electors		3,481		
Liberal hold		Swing	+1.5	
Conservative hold		Swing	−7.5	

== See also ==
- Parliamentary constituencies in Shropshire#Historical constituencies
- List of former United Kingdom Parliament constituencies
- Unreformed House of Commons
