= Thomas Lawley =

Thomas Lawley may refer to

- Thomas Lawley (MP died 1559), MP for Much Wenlock
- Thomas Lawley (MP died 1621), MP for Much Wenlock (UK Parliament constituency)
- Sir Thomas Lawley, 1st Baronet (died 1646), MP for Much Wenlock
- Sir Thomas Lawley, 3rd Baronet (c.1650–1729), MP for Much Wenlock

== See also ==
- Lawley (surname)
