= Richard Ottley =

English Royalist politician and soldier

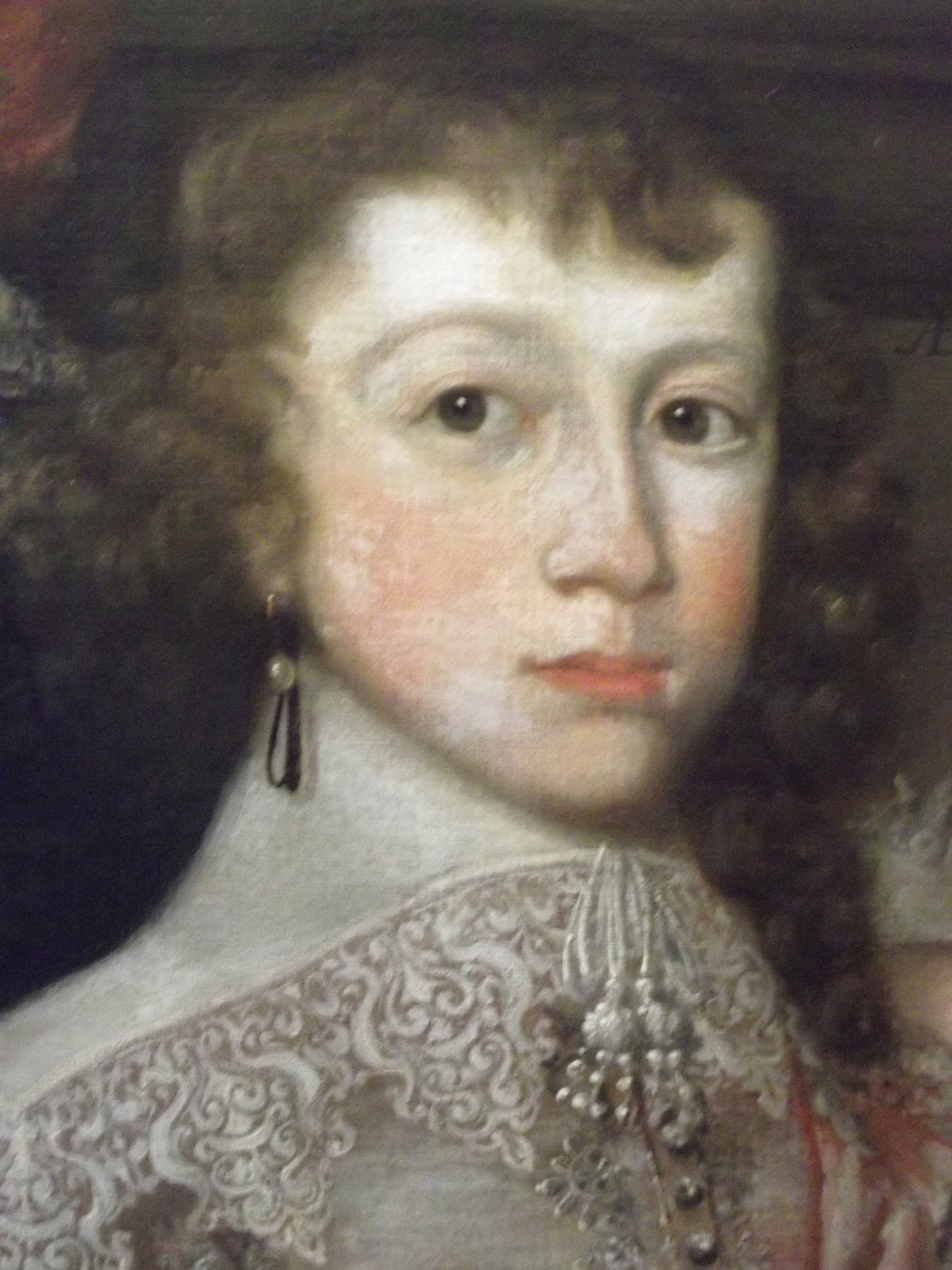
- Richard Ottley, aged 10, from a family portrait, now in Shrewsbury Museum and Art Gallery

Deputy Lieutenant of Shropshire
- In office 3 September 1660 – 1670

Member of Parliament for Shropshire
- In office 1661–1670
- Monarch: Charles II

Personal details
- Born: 5 August 1626 Pitchford Hall, Shropshire
- Died: 10 August 1670 (aged 44)
- Spouse: Lettice Ridgeway
- Children: 7, including Adam
- Parents: Sir Francis Ottley; Lucy Edwards
- Relatives: Sir Thomas Wolryche, 1st Baronet (uncle); John Wolryche (cousin)
- Profession: Politician, soldier

Sir Richard Ottley (5 August 1626 – 10 August 1670) was an English Royalist politician and soldier who served as a youth in the English Civil War in Shropshire. After the Restoration he played a prominent part in the repression of Parliamentarians and Nonconformists and was MP for Shropshire in the Cavalier Parliament.

== Background, early life and education ==
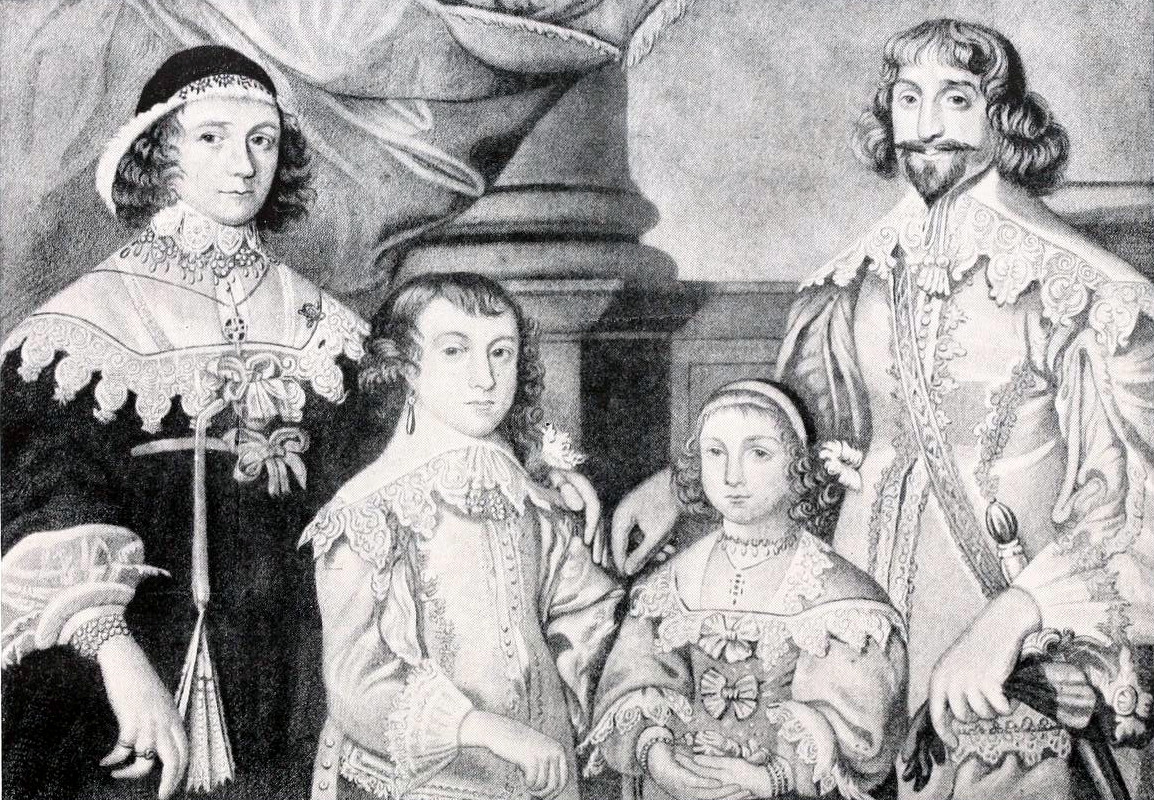
Richard Otley pictured, aged ten, with his parents, Sir Francis and Lucy Ottley, and his sister, Mary. An engraving made c.1825 after an oil painting of 1636 by Petrus Troueil, now owned by the Shrewsbury Museums Service.

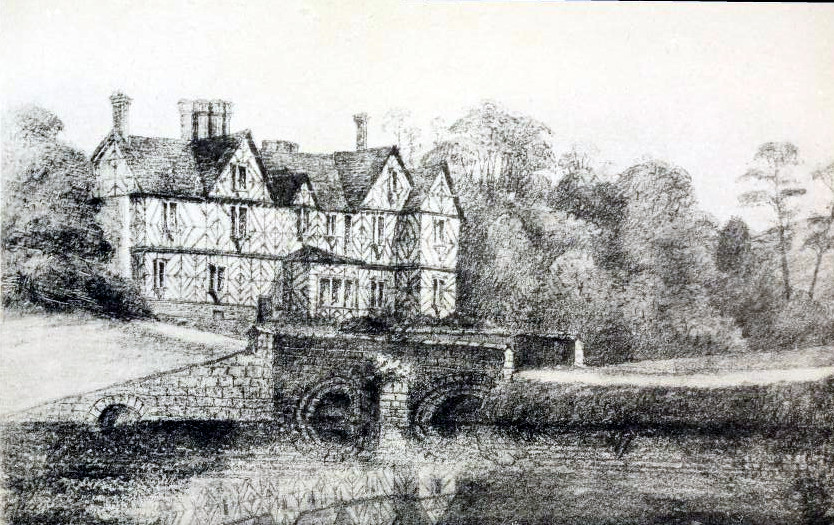
Pitchford Hall, Shropshire, home of the Royalist Ottley family in the 17th century. Pictured in 1901

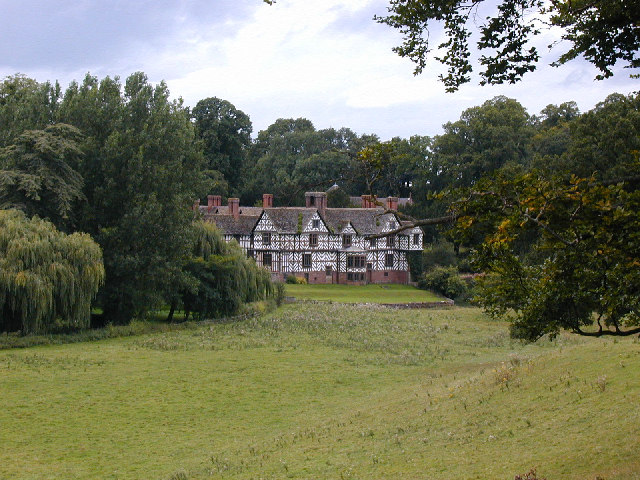
Pitchford Hall, photographed 2005.

Richard Ottley was the eldest son of

- Sir Francis Ottley of Pitchford, Shropshire, who was military governor of Shrewsbury for part of the English Civil War
- Lucy Edwards, daughter of Thomas Edwards of the College, Shrewsbury. She was the widow of Thomas Pope, another Shrewsbury resident.

The Ottley family were part of the landed gentry of Shropshire and claimed descent from the more ancient Ottleys of Oteley, near Ellesmere, Shropshire. However, Thomas Ottley, the ancestor who bought Pitchford Hall in 1473, was a Merchant of the Staple with a house in Calais as well as in Shrewsbury. The Ottleys of Pitchford owed their status to wealth made as merchants of the thriving county town, with its monopoly in the finishing of Welsh cloth.

Richard Ottley was born on 5 August 1626 and christened on 15 September. He had a brother, Adam, who was born in 1628 and a sister, Mary, who was born in 1630. He was admitted to Shrewsbury School on 9 April 1638, the same day as his brother Adam. but his education beyond that stage was interrupted by the outbreak of the Civil War in 1642.

== The Civil War and Commonwealth ==
Francis Ottley was quick to act to disrupt Parliamentary mobilization in Shropshire as Civil War threatened in the summer of 1642 and was instrumental in preparing the king's move from Nottingham to Shrewsbury in September, when the king knighted him. Richard Ottley, who was commissioned a captain in the royalist army, served under his father in the Shrewsbury garrison. Sir Francis held the town after the king's departure and was formally appointed as military governor in January 1643. He was removed by Prince Rupert in the summer of 1644. Sir Francis was captured by Parliamentarian forces in February 1645 on the eve of the fall of Shrewsbury, although later released.

Richard was present at the siege of Bridgnorth in 1646 and was covered by the surrender agreement negotiated by his father, which allowed the Royalist garrison to choose between peace and exile. The agreement explicitly granted permission to Lady Ottley and her children to live at Pitchford. The estates of both Sir Francis and Lady Ottley had been sequestrated by Parliament. Lady Ottley used the good offices of a friend and relative, Elinor Davenport, in contacting the sequestrators over furnishings and clothing. and employed Thomas Lee, a relative of Sir Francis and a Lincoln's Inn lawyer, to negotiate recovery of her own estates. On 16 June 1646 Richard was given a pass to travel to Shrewsbury to speak to Parliament's County Committee, probably in connection with his father's request to compound for delinquency, which was made on that date. A decision on the allowance for Lady Ottley and the children was soon made: a fifth of Sir Francis's estates was handed over to them for their maintenance by an order of 5 September 1646. However, the outstanding issues took three years to resolve.

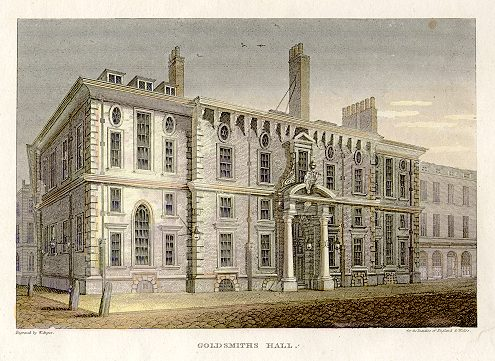
Goldsmith's Hall.

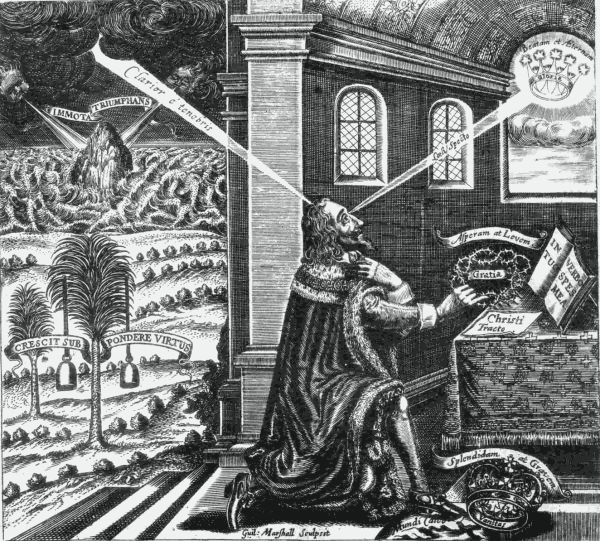
Frontispiece to Eikon Basilike.

Richard Ottley spent a considerable part of this time in London with his father, often having to attend Goldsmiths' Hall, where the Committee for Compounding with Delinquents was housed. On 12 January he wrote to his mother from Gray's Inn to report that his father had obtained permission to live at home and that his personal property had been secured while he compounded. He thanked her for a pie. Richard was admitted to Gray's Inn for legal training on 1 March 1647. In April Lady Ottley wrote to him to report that Sir Francis had not actually gone home as there was a possibility he would be prosecuted by Humphrey Mackworth, who, although reckoned a cousin, was the Parliamentarian governor of Shrewsbury. Later in the year, on 2 August, Richard's younger brother Adam was also admitted to Gray's Inn.

Adam wrote to Lady Ottley in September 1648 in anticipation of Richard's engagement to Lady Lettice Ridgeway, "soe good a sister in y^{e} place of y^{t} deare one w'ch I soe lately lost." The marriage probably took place in January 1649: their first child was born on October. On 24 March Sir Francis, with his last extant letter, sent Lettice a copy of Eikon Basilike, purportedly a collection of Charles I's final meditations and apologia: the same book had recently been sent by Adam Ottley to his mother. The Ottleys were clearly finding resources to sustain their royalist faith.

On 13 April 1649 Sir Francis asked for Richard to be included in his composition. A reduced fine of £1860 was announced on the very next day. In recognition that the estates were encumbered by about £4,000 of debts, a further reduction of £660 was ordered on 25 June 1649, leaving a fine of £1200 to pay. Sir Francis survived only a few months, dying on 11 September, and leaving Richard as his heir. On 9 March 1650 Richard Ottley took the oath of loyalty before two Middlesex justices of the peace to the Commonwealth, "as it is now established, without a King or House of Lords." This was necessary to gain permission to travel, as recusants and delinquents needed a pass from their county committee to travel more than five miles from home. With permission from the Parliamentary committees in Shropshire and Staffordshire, he was able to travel to the Midlands, settle his affairs and regain his estates. In July he obtained a pass to journey into Wales and to Oswestry on business, and in September he travelled to Yoxall to visit his wife's grandmother in Staffordshire. Lettice Ottley was by this time pregnant with their second child, as one of her great aunts, Cassandra Willoughby of Wollaton Hall noted shortly afterwards in a letter.

The end of the year brought prospects of Ottley's completion of his business with the Commissioners for Compounding. On 20 December he was told that he owed £296 and could discharge this in two equal instalments at fortnightly intervals. However, the sum seems to have been wrongly transcribed, for the next communication from the commissioners, dated 17 January, refers to a debt of £269. Ottley had already promptly paid £134 10s. The commissioners had reviewed his debts and told him that they required only another £35 10s. This he paid immediately and on 24 January 1651 all seizures, sequestrations and penalties on the Ottley estates were discharged.

Ottley seems thereafter to have been mainly quiescent during the rule of Oliver Cromwell. He took no part in the Penruddock uprising of 1655, although he probably alluded to it in a letter of May 1655, sent from his Inn of Court, where he stayed when in London. However, later that year he was faced by a large claim for compensation from a Mary Moloy, widow of Hugh Lewis, a London goldsmith. In a letter to Ottley, Humphrey Mackworth, the son and successor of the earlier governor, alleged that Sir Francis Ottley had confiscated from Lewis jewellery to the value of £600 during the Civil War. When she later sued him, Sir Francis had offered £300. Mackworth recommended that Ottley pay up, as Cromwell was exasperated by royalists because of the recent rising. Apparently Ottley decided to wait on events and Moloy's petition to Cromwell portrayed her as the daughter of a hero of the Nine Years' War in Ireland who had taken refuge in England during the Civil War. Now having four small children to feed, she had in turn sued Sir Francis and asked his heir for recompense. On 13 October Cromwell referred the matter to Mackworth, who was authorised to summon and question Richard Ottley. The matter seems to have been resolved the following month by Ottley paying Moloy the much smaller sum of £60.

Ottley witnessed the funeral of Cromwell in November 1658 and wrote from Gray's Inn to inform his mother, enclosing a printed description. The Protectorate fell apart during the succeeding year. On 25 November 1659, a day after General Monck took overall command of the army, Richard and Adam Ottley were given a pass by Charles Fleetwood allowing them to travel between London and Pitchford without further hindrance: the regime had ceased to wield effective authority and had given up the attempt to control its enemies.

== Restoration and repression ==
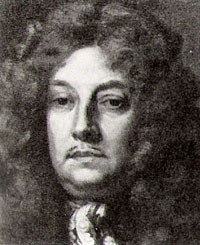
Francis Lord Newport, the Lord Lieutenant, was responsible for purging Calvinists from public office after the Restoration. He later suffered a similar fate himself for his opposition to the succession of James II.

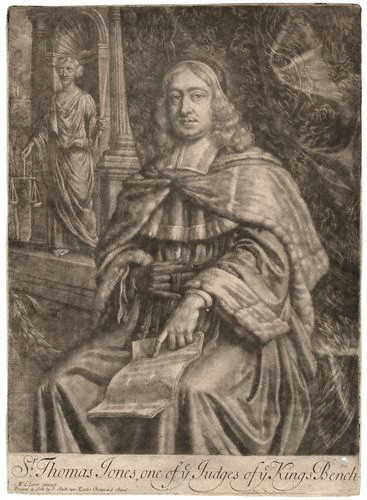
Thomas Jones, the town clerk of Shrewsbury. A Presbyterian who had remained in the town when it was under royalist military occupation during the Civil War, Jones was nonetheless seen as a threat by Newport and Ottley who went to considerable lengths to remove him. This did not impede his later career and he went on to become Chief Justice of the Common Pleas under James II.

After General Monck's intervention against the remaining Commonwealth forces, at the beginning of 1660, Richard Ottley came back into public life and began to take part in local government. He was appointed a Justice of the Peace for Shropshire in March 1660. There are no records for 1660 but he and Adam, his brother, are recorded as sitting on the bench at the January quarter sessions of 1660/61. Thereafter he does not appear in the record again until July 1662 and his attendance thereafter seems to have been sporadic.

Ottley contacted Charles II and on 5 March Charles issued a commission from Brussels, appointing Ottley, his friend Richard Scriven and others as commissioners for Shropshire. They were authorised to raise a large militia force for the king's cause, to set up a command structure and to levy contributions for its support. Shrewsbury was still held by the stalwart Parliamentarian Colonel Thomas Hunt, who carried out a review of military resources and preparedness during April and arranged a muster of his forces for 1 May. However events were moving too quickly for Hunt's measures to take effect. The Convention Parliament accepted Charles II as king on 8 May. Ottley set off for Dover to welcome Charles to England in May. Charles entered London on 29 May and Ottley wrote from there to his mother:

"My most deare and evere honored Mother,
"I prayse God we are safe come to towne, and his Matie with his two brotheres, the duke of Yorke and duke of Glouster, are now at Whitehall. I met them at Canterbury, and had the happinesse to be of the life guard since Fryday last; wherein my content over ballanced the paynes I underwent. I most, humbly thanke your Lap for your py which I shiall enquire after. I beg pardon that I am soe short in wrighting, being weary at p'sent: I humbly crave your blessing: with my duty and thanks for your goodnesse to mine, for whom my hearty prayers to God are : I rest

"Your Laps most dutiful sonne and servant,

"May 29, Ric. Ottley."

Shortly after the king's return, Ottley was knighted. On 19 June Ottley and Scriven issued a document at Shrewsbury that effectively annexed the resources promised to Hunt's militia to their own force, ending the dual military authority that had existed formally to that point. On 16 July a letter was issued by command of Charles II urging the Mayor of Shrewsbury to appoint Adam Ottley as town clerk. However, then position then was not, as the king had been informed, vacant: the post had been filled during the Commonwealth by Thomas Jones, who was to prove a resourceful opponent to the new dispensation.

On 26 July Francis Lord Newport of High Ercall was commissioned Lord Lieutenant of Shropshire with wide-ranging powers. Ottley was made his Deputy Lieutenant on 3 September. The following month Newport appointed him captain of a cavalry troop in the county militia.

Repression of the old Parliamentarians began with claims that some had taken property from High Ercall and other places. Their houses were ransacked, resulting in a petition of protest from Thomas Hunt, an alderman of Shrewsbury, to the House of Commons, alleging he had lost goods to the value of £1377 18s. 9d. Edmund Waring, a former Parliamentarian governor of Shrewsbury, and Vavasor Powell, a Welsh Independent preacher and theologian, were arrested and imprisoned. Ottley released Waring after a short time, as he was not persuaded there were good grounds or valid warrant for his detention. A Fifth Monarchist rising in London on 6 January 1661 panicked the Privy Council. On 8 January Newport was ordered to disarm any disaffected people in the county and to administer to them the Oath of Supremacy. On 22 January a further letter stepped up the pressure greatly with a demand that the county authorities arrest "dangerous persons." Forwarding the Privy Council's letter to Ottley on 24 January, Newport rebuked him for being too lenient:

"I send you enclosed a letter from the Councell, and a proclamation for the moderating of your proceedings. Though it may bee conceived a very ineffectual way for the securinge of persons to send warrants to a constable, yet if souldiers bringe the warrant to him, your ends may seeme accomplishable. You see the letter speakes of leadinge men. Therefore you did ill in releasinge Waringe, and you needed not have apprehended his ranting demand of a mittimus, which will serve him for discourse in his two pot houses. I would advise you to send for him agen, though not as a criminal by proofe, yet as a dangerous person, especially havinge the comand of the Councell for it."

However, Newport then drew Ottley's attention to an enclosed complaint from Captain Turner, who had been detained while visiting his wife and children at Shrewsbury, though he had a valid pass to do so from the authorities at Hull to do so: Newport urged Ottley allow him to leave the town. With neither Newport nor the Council quite able to define their desired balance of clemency and repression, Ottley seems to have erred on the side of rigour. By 4 March the Council was troubled that the Shropshire authorities might be overstepping the mark. They wrote to tell Newport that the king was troubled by large numbers of petitions from those arrested on mere suspicion and that they were to be released forthwith. Many of those arrested were Quakers, who had suffered persecution even before the Restoration. Henceforth, decreed the Council, only the "Ringleaders of Faction" were to be detained.

Nevertheless, Newport had already recommended Ottley and Sir Francis Lawley as MPs for the county of Shropshire, and they were duly elected in April. However, the borough of Shrewsbury elected as its two members its town clerk, Thomas Jones, a leading Presbyterian although never an enthusiastic Parliamentarian, and Robert Leighton, who had been uncommitted in the Civil War. Attempts under the Convention Parliament (1660) to accommodate the Presbyterians within the Church of England had come to nothing. Jones was determined to entrench Presbyterianism in Shrewsbury for as long as possible. In October 1661 he had a new deed of appointment drawn up for Francis Tallents, the Presbyterian minister of St Mary's Church, which was technically a Royal Peculiar but actually in the gift of the council. Jones was supported in this by the mayor, Richard Bagot, and the headmaster of Shrewsbury School, Richard Pigot. The Corporation Act of December 1661 gave Newport and Ottley an opportunity, as it sought to remove Presbyterians from office by forcing them to abjure the Solemn League and Covenant. Newport urged Ottley to use his seat at Westminster to speak out against Jones. Ottley's intervention sent Jones back to Shrewsbury, where he tried to get all vacant places on the council immediately filled with supporters. However, the deputy lieutenants sent men to impose house arrest on the mayor and aldermen and removed them from office for refusing to take the oath. Tallents and Pigot, together with other known Presbyterians and ex-Roundhead officers were imprisoned in July 1662. Newport and a group of county gentry were appointed commissioners to review and reform the governance of the town. They appointed Adam Ottley town clerk in place of Jones on 9 August, citing Jones's long record of political manoeuvring, promoting Presbytrerianism, giving legal advice to suspects. This was followed by a thorough purge of Nonconformists from public life. There was widespread agitation against the restored monarchy early in 1663. Repressive activity in Shropshire was initially at a lower level than in neighbouring counties. However, in July 1663 Newport used the rumour of a plot to seize Chester Castle to send Ottley after supposed conspiratorial meetings of ejected ministers in Shrewsbury, with detailed instructions for spying and intimidation. In October, with rumours of plots still abounding, Newport told Ottley to confine military preparations to the close guarding of the major towns to avoid the expense of mobilising the militia outside the time of the general muster. Later he reverted to warning that the Presbyterians of Shrewsbury might be in league with conspirators in the North of England and recommending that they and Waring be subject to a fishing expedition with a view to "entrap some of them in their answers." A similar group of suspects were subjected to further detention in August 1665.

== Cavalier Parliament ==
Ottley was elected to the Parliament of 1661–79, the longest-lasting English parliament, and did not survive to the end of it, dying in 1670. The parliament was known as the Cavalier Parliament because it was largely royalist in sympathy, although important divisions appeared long before it ended. Ottley's election was almost certainly the result of Newport's influence. Newport, later first Earl of Bradford, was to dominate elections until his death in 1708, gradually evolving into a Whig and suffering for it when he opposed the succession of James II.

After being a very active lieutenant of Newport in the county, Ottley became a very active member of Parliament, which probably accounts for his decreasing participation in local and regional affairs. He was a member of no less than 230 committees. Initially much of his work reflected his work at local level, with a focus on legislation that repressed religious dissent. He was on the committee that steered the Act of Uniformity 1662. He was also a member of the committees for the Conventicle Act 1664 and a second Corporations Act, both elaborating the Clarendon Code which bore down on both Catholics and Protestant Nonconformists. His political loyalty and zeal brought appointment as a Gentleman of the Privy chamber on 18 December 1663. After the fall of Edward Hyde, 1st Earl of Clarendon in 1667, Ottley served on the committee to investigate his Sale of Dunkirk to France and another which looked into the running of the fund for loyal and indigent officers, which had been set up by the king to compensate royalist officers ruined by the Civil War. He had been one of the commissioners implementing the scheme in Shropshire. It had proved a disappointment and protests in 1666 led to a review.

Ottley's own compensation took the form of commissions to collect taxes in Shropshire, which he undertook with his close friend and business partner, Richard Scriven, later MP for Bishop's Castle First they were made receivers of the county's hearth tax, the key tax on property. In 1663 they made a successful bid of £2,800 for the farm of the county's excise. However, the hearth tax concession was revoked in 1667 and Ottley and Scriven were ordered to pay arrears of £700. They sought to collect the amounts owing but this led to public disorder, with distrained goods and papers being stolen. To help his efforts at repayment, he was given any prize-money concealed during the Commonwealth that he could discover. He and Scriven were also granted all treasure trove found since the Restoration, as well as part of a Cheshire outlaw's estate. However, they were still unsuccessful. Ottley's arrears were remitted shortly before he died in 1670, although Scriven did not settle his debt until 1682.

== Marriage and family ==
Richard Ottley was married to Lady Lettice Ridgeway, daughter of Robert Ridgeway, 2nd Earl of Londonderry. The Ridgeway family fortune was based on the first earl's exploitation of land assigned to him as an "undertaker," or government contactor, during the Plantation of Ulster. Richard and Lady Lettice Ottley had six sons and one daughter, five of whose baptisms are recorded in the Pitchford parish register.

- Francis, born 11 October 1649. Died May 1652.
- Thomas (baptised 18 February 1651), Sir Richard's heir, married one Elizabeth and died in 1695.
- Richard (baptised 6 July 1652), died in infancy and was buried 30 March 1654.
- Adam (baptised 5 January 1655), Bishop of St David's 1713–23, died in 1723.
- Robert (baptised 26 July 1655)
- Lucy (baptised 28 February 1657) died in 1687
- Francis (baptised 2 June 1660)

Dame Lettice Ottley was buried at Pitchford on 8 March 1669. Sir Richard Ottley died aged 44 on 10 August 1670 and was buried at Pitchford.

=== Family tree ===
Family tree: the Ottleys of Pitchford

The following family tree is based on information extracted from the heraldic visitations of Shropshire, Lord Hawkesbury's pedigree and the Pitchford parish register.

Philip Ottley of Ottley in the Lordship of Ellesmere, Shropshire	Anne Lacon of Willey
Anne, Daughter of Robert Scriven of Frodesley	Thomas Ottley (died 1485), 3rd son, Merchant of the Staple of Calais, Bailiff of Shrewsbury 1439–43, 1st Alderman 1444, purchased Pitchford 1473	Margaret (died 1486), daughter of Sir Humphrey Blount of Kinlet
William Ottley (died 1529) of Pitchford Hall, High Sheriff of Shropshire 1500 and 1513	Margery, daughter and heiress of John Bruyn of the Hay, near Bridgnorth	John Ottley	Richard Ottley, Rector of Pitchford 1509–20
Thomas Ottley (died 1534) of Pitchford	Katherine, daughter of Sir Robert Corbet of Moreton Corbet Castle	7 further sons	12 daughters
William Ottley (died 1543) of Pitchford	Margaret, daughter of Edward Leighton
Adam Ottley (died 1578) of Pitchford	Marie (died 1592), daughter of Richard Mainwaring of Ightfield
Catherine (died 1586) daughter of John Mackworth of Betton Strange	Richard Ottley (died 1606) of Pitchford	Katherine Lake (died 1603)
Mary (1576–1642), daughter of Roger Gifford MD, MP for Old Sarum	Thomas Ottley of Pitchford (died 1622)	Francis Ottley	Richard Mackworth of Betton Strange	Dorothy Cranage, later Gorton	Adam Ottley of London
Sir Francis Ottley of Pitchford (c.1600–1649), Royalist governor of Shrewsbury 1643-4, Royalist High Sheriff of Shropshire 1645-6	Lucy (c.1593–1680), daughter of Thomas Edwards of the College, Shrewsbury	Richard Ottley (born 1602), Royalist infantry captain	Ursula Ottley (born 1607)	Sir Thomas Wolryche, 1st Baronet (1598–1668) of Dudmaston Hall, MP for Wenlock, Royalist military governor of Bridgnorth 1643-4	Humphrey Mackworth (died 1654) of Betton Strange, Colonel in Parliamentary army, governor of Shrewsbury 1645–54, Member of Council of State, MP for Shropshire in First Protectorate Parliament	Adam Ottley
Sir Richard Ottley of Pitchford (1626–70), Gentleman of the Privy Chamber to Charles II, Deputy Lieutenant of Shropshire, MP for Shropshire	Lettice (died 1668), daughter of Robert Ridgeway, 2nd Earl of Londonderry	Adam Ottley (1628–93), Town Clerk of Shrewsbury 1662–81	Mary (1629–48)	Sir Francis Wolryche, 2nd Baronet (1627–88), declared insane	John Wolryche (c.1637–85), MP for Much Wenlock, ancestor of remaining Wolryche baronets	Mary Griffith, daughter of Matthew Griffith, royal chaplain.
Thomas Ottley of Pitchford (1750–95)	Elizabeth (died 1725), daughter of Sir Samuel Baldwyn (c.1618–83) of Elsedge, Serjeant-at-Law, MP for Ludlow	Adam Ottley (1654/5-1723), Bishop of St David's	Anne Baldwyn (died 1720), probably daughter of Sir Samuel Baldwyn and sister of Elizabeth	Wolryche Baronets
Adam Ottley (1685–1752) of Pitchford, High Sheriff of Shropshire 1738	Bridget (died 1737), daughter of Sir William Gresley, 3rd Baronet, of Drakelow, Derbyshire	Mary Ottley (1678–44)	Revd. John Davies (died 1742), Rector of Pitchford (1741–2)
Thomas Ottley (1716–1807) of Pitchford, together with his son adopted as heir Charles Cecil Cope Jenkinson, later 3rd Earl of Liverpool	Catherine (died 1792), daughter of Sir Robert Bankes Jenkinson, 4th Baronet of Walcot, Oxfordshire, and Hawkesbury, Gloucestershire, and cousin of Charles Jenkinson, 1st Earl of Liverpool	Adam Ottley 1719–98)	Bridget Ottley (1721–43)
Adam Ottley (1745–1807), died sine prole
