= Richard Cornwall (died 1569) =

English politician

Richard Cornwall (1493 – 14 June 1569) was an English politician.

He was born in 1493, the eldest son of Sir Thomas Cornwall of Burford, Shropshire and Anne Corbet. He succeeded his father as ninth Baron of Burford in 1537.

Cornwall was one of many English knights to accompany Charles Brandon, 1st Duke of Suffolk in an invasion of France.

He was a justice of the peace for Shropshire from 1542 to 1564 and was appointed High Sheriff of Shropshire for 1548–49, 1554–55 and 1561–62. He was elected a member (MP) of the Parliament of England for Much Wenlock in 1545 and for Pembrokeshire in 1555.

He died in 1569 and was buried at Burford. He had married Jane, the daughter of Sir Henry Wogan of Wiston, Pembrokeshire. they had 2 sons and a daughter.

Parliament of England
Preceded by William Blount; Reginald Corbet	Member of Parliament for Much Wenlock; 1545–47; With: Richard Lawley	Succeeded by Richard Lawley; Thomas Lawley
Preceded by Arnold Butler	Member of Parliament for Pembrokeshire; 1555–58	Succeeded by Thomas Cathern
