= Lawley (surname) =

Lawley is a surname. Notable people with the surname include:

- Melissa Lawley (born 1994), English association footballer
- Robyn Lawley (born 1989), Australian model
- Sue Lawley (born 1946), English broadcaster
- William R. Lawley, Jr. (1920–1999), United States Army Air Forces officer
- Wenlock Lawleys
  - Richard Lawley (died 1569), English MP
  - Robert Lawley, 1st Baron Wenlock (1768–1834), British landowner and politician
  - Beilby Lawley, 2nd Baron Wenlock (1818–1880), English nobleman
  - Francis Charles Lawley (1825–1901), British journalist and politician
  - Beilby Lawley, 3rd Baron Wenlock (1849–1912), English nobleman
  - Arthur Lawley, 6th Baron Wenlock, Governor of Western Australia from 1901 to 1902
  - Sir Francis Lawley, 2nd Baronet (c. 1630 – 1696)
  - Sir Robert Lawley, 5th Baronet (1736–1793), English landowner and politician

== See also ==
- Lalley (surname)
