= Sir Thomas Littleton, 2nd Baronet =

English politician

Sir Thomas Littleton, 2nd Baronet (c. 1621 – 14 April 1681) was an English politician from the extended Littleton/Lyttelton family who sat in the House of Commons variously between 1640 and 1681.

Littleton was the son of Sir Adam Littleton, 1st Baronet of Stoke St. Milborough, Shropshire and his wife Audrey Poyntz daughter of Thomas Poyntz. He studied at Jesus College, Oxford, but did not graduate.

Littleton was elected Member of Parliament for the borough of Wenlock in April 1640 for the Short Parliament and was re-elected for the borough in November 1640 for the Long Parliament. As a Royalist, he was disabled from sitting in 1644. He inherited the baronetcy on the death of his father in 1647. In 1652 he sold the Stoke St. Milborough estate to Henry Bernard.

After the Restoration, Littleton sat for Wenlock again in the Cavalier Parliament from 1661 to 1679. He was subsequently elected MP for East Grinstead in 1679 and MP for Yarmouth (Isle of Wight) in 1681, a month before he died.

In October 1637, Littleton married his cousin Anne, daughter of Edward Littleton, 1st Baron Lyttleton of Mounslow. Their son and heir, Sir Thomas Littleton, 3rd Baronet, became Speaker of the House of Commons.

Parliament of England
Vacant Parliament suspended since 1629	Member of Parliament for Wenlock; 1640–1644; With: Richard Cresset 1640; William Pierpoint 1640–1644	Succeeded by William Pierpoint; Humphrey Bridges
Preceded by Sir Francis Lawley; Thomas Whitmore	Member of Parliament for Wenlock; 1661–1679; With: George Weld	Succeeded by Sir John Weld; William Forester
Preceded by Thomas Pelham; Henry Powle	Member of Parliament for East Grinstead; 1679; With: Thomas Pelham	Succeeded by Goodwin Wharton; William Jephson
Preceded by Sir Richard Mason; Thomas Wyndham	Member of Parliament for Yarmouth; 1681; With: Lemuel Kingdon	Succeeded by Thomas Wyndham; William Hewer
Baronetage of England
Preceded by Adam Littleton	Baronet (of Stoke Milburgh, Salop); 1647–1681	Succeeded by Thomas Littleton
