= Thomas Fanshawe (remembrancer of the exchequer) =

English politician and writer (1533–1601)

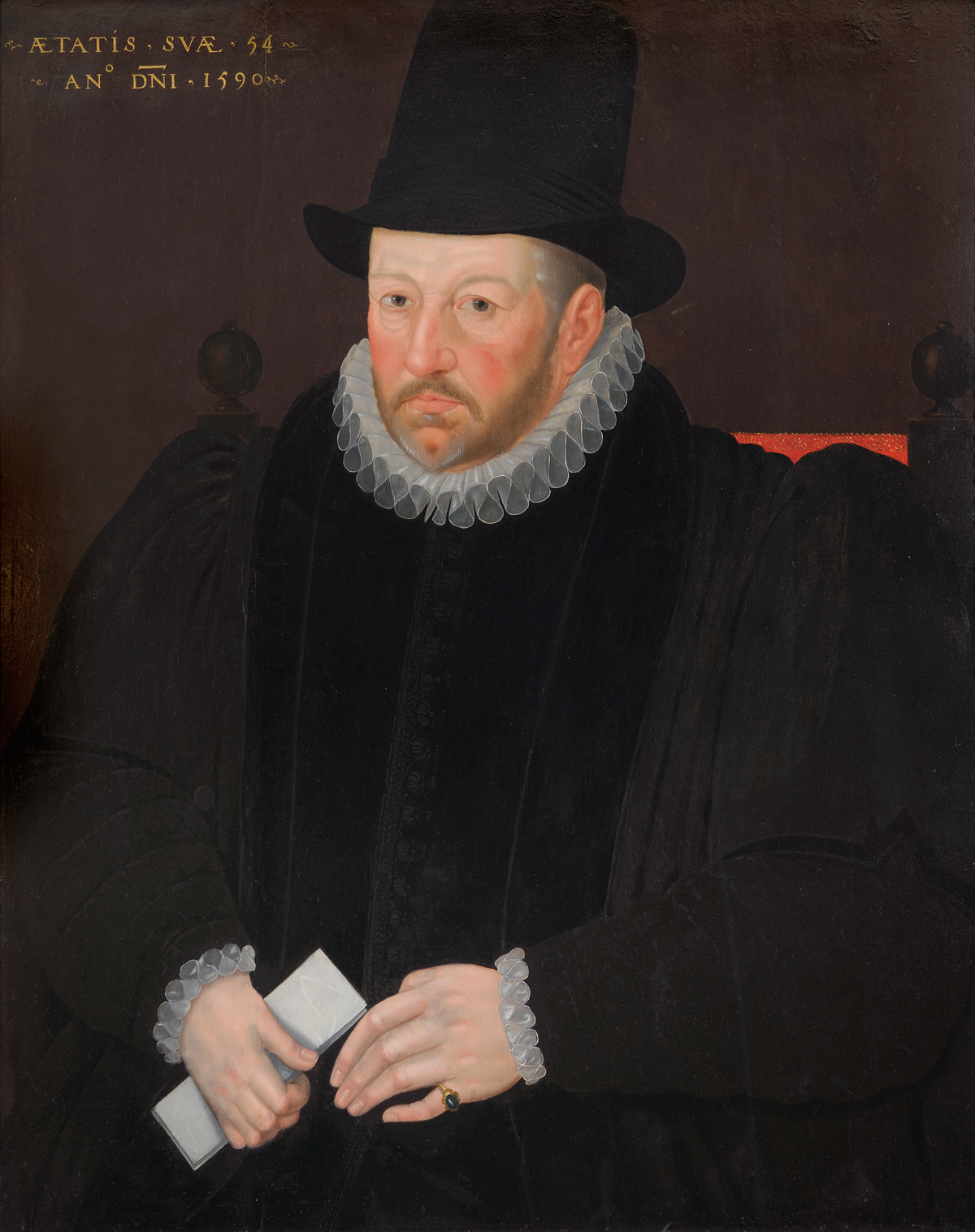
Thomas Fanshawe, Remembrancer of the Exchequer, by Marcus Gheeraerts the Younger

Thomas Fanshawe (1533–1601) was a Member of the English Parliament during the reign of Queen Elizabeth I. He also held the civil service post of Queen's remembrancer of the exchequer.

== Background ==
Fanshawe was the eldest son of John Fanshawe of Fanshawe Gate and grandson of Robert Fanshawe of Fanshawe Gate near Holmesfield, Derbyshire, where he was born about the year 1530. He studied at Jesus College, Cambridge, and became a member of the Middle Temple.

== Career ==
His uncle, Henry Fanshawe, took him under his protection, and procured for him the reversion of the appointment of the office of Remembrancer of the Exchequer, then occupied by the elder Henry. This office was held during five tenures by members of the family. Fanshawe acquired considerable wealth in his office, to which he succeeded on his uncle's death in 1568. Besides Fanshawe Gate, which he let to his brother, he owned Ware Park, Hertfordshire (an estate he acquired in 1575) and Jenkins, in Barking, Essex, and other property. He fulfilled the duties of his office with diligence, as we find by various entries in the State Papers of Elizabeth's reign. In 1597 (29 May) he wrote to Lord Burghley that 'by my continually attending the business of my office all the term, I have too much neglected my health and business in the country, and as my presence is urgently required there I have left all things in such a state that the duties may be as well performed without me. I hope I may repair thither and stay until the term. ... If there shall be any occasion for my attendance, I will speedily return, though to my hindrance both in health and profit.'

Fanshawe sat in the parliament of 1571 for Rye, in five succeeding parliaments for Arundel, and in 1597 for Much Wenlock, Shropshire. In 1579 he established, in accordance with the will of his uncle, the free grammar school of Dronfield.

== Family life ==
Fanshawe died at his house, Warwick Lane, London, 19 February 1601. His funeral was held 19 March, at the parish church of Ware.

Fanshawe had married twice:

1. Mary (d. 9 June 1578), daughter of Anthony Bourchier, who was also the niece of notable statesmen Sir Walter Mildmay and Thomas Mildmay; and
2. Joan, daughter of Thomas Smith of Ostenhanger,

and had issue by both marriages. His elder son by his first marriage, Henry, succeeded him as remembrancer. Thomas, his eldest son by his second marriage, inherited Jenkins and other estates at Barking and was an MP for Lancaster. William, his youngest son, was also an MP. Alice, his eldest daughter by the second marriage, married Sir Christopher Hatton, a first cousin godson of the Lord Chancellor and favorite of Queen Elizabeth, Sir Christopher Hatton.

Thomas Fanshawe's widow was buried at Ware on 30 May 1622.

== Works ==
- The Practice of the Exchequor Court, with its severall Offices and Officers. Being a short narration of the power and duty of each single person in his severall place. Written at the request of the Lord Buckhurst, sometime Lord Treasurer of England, 1658 (there is at Oxford a manuscript of this or a similar treatise by Fanshawe, Catal MSS. Angl. (Coll. Oxon.), ii. 226). This work has since been attributed to Fanshawe's colleague Peter Osborne.
- An Answer to Articles concerning the Lord Treasurer's Office (fragment in Lansd. MS. 253, art. 33).

Parliament of England
Preceded by John Bredes; John Donning	Member of Parliament for Rye; 1571 – 1572; With: Clement Cobbe died, replaced by Robert Carpenter	Succeeded by John Hammond; Henry Gaymer
Preceded by Thomas Browne; Michael Heneage	Member of Parliament for Arundel; 1572 – 1597; With: Richard Browne 1572–84; Robert Buxton 1584–86; Thomas Palmer 1586–88; Richard Baker 1588–93	Succeeded by James Smith; William Essex
Preceded by William Baynham; William Lacon	Member of Parliament for Wenlock c 1598 – 1601; With: William Lacon	Succeeded by John Brett; William Leighton
