= Kinnersley =

Village in Herefordshire, England

Coordinates: 52.141°N 2.962°W

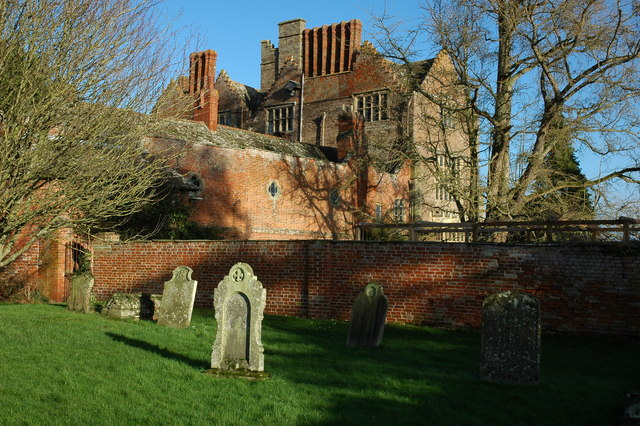
- Kinnersley Castle, a Grade II* listed building in the centre of the village

- Location within Herefordshire
- Population: 316 (2011)
- Shire county: Herefordshire
- Region: West Midlands
- Country: England
- Sovereign state: United Kingdom
- Post town: Hereford
- Postcode district: HR3
- Dialling code: 01544
- Police: West Mercia
- Fire: Hereford and Worcester
- Ambulance: West Midlands
- UK Parliament: North Herefordshire

Kinnersley is a village and civil parish in Herefordshire, England. The village is about 5 miles (8 km) east of the Wales-England border and 10 miles (16 km) north-west of Hereford.

== Geography ==
At roughly 200 metres above sea level and 2 miles (3.2 km) north of the River Wye, the village is mostly elevated away from the floodplain of the Wye. It has steep hills nearby which almost enclose and shelter Kinnersley. Summers are warm and relatively dry, winters are cool and wet. Surrounding Kinnersley are mostly crops and apple orchards which are owned by local cider companies including H. P. Bulmer. The scenery looks towards the Black Mountains and Hereford. The main Brecon to Leominster road, the A44 passes through Kinnersley.

== Community ==
Parish population, of about 100, is employed partly in farming and agriculture, or in nearby towns and cities. The village has a high proportion of pensioners.

The Grade I parish church of Church of St James was restored and improved over many years by George Frederick Bodley, winner of the Royal Gold Medal for architecture in 1899, who had married Minna Reaveley in 1872. Minna was a daughter of the family who at that time owned Kinnersley Castle. Bodley is buried in a Grade II monument in the churchyard. Adjacent to the east from the church is the Grade II* Kinnersley Castle.

The local public house, the Kinnersley Arms closed down in 2022.
