= Lalley (surname) =

Lalley is a surname.

== List of people of the surname ==
- Gene Lalley (1922–1972), American professional basketball player
- Kate Lalley, American politician from Vermont
- Steven Lalley (born 1954), American statistician and mathematician

== See also ==
- Lalley, France
- Lawley (surname)
