= Adam Ottley =

English churchman

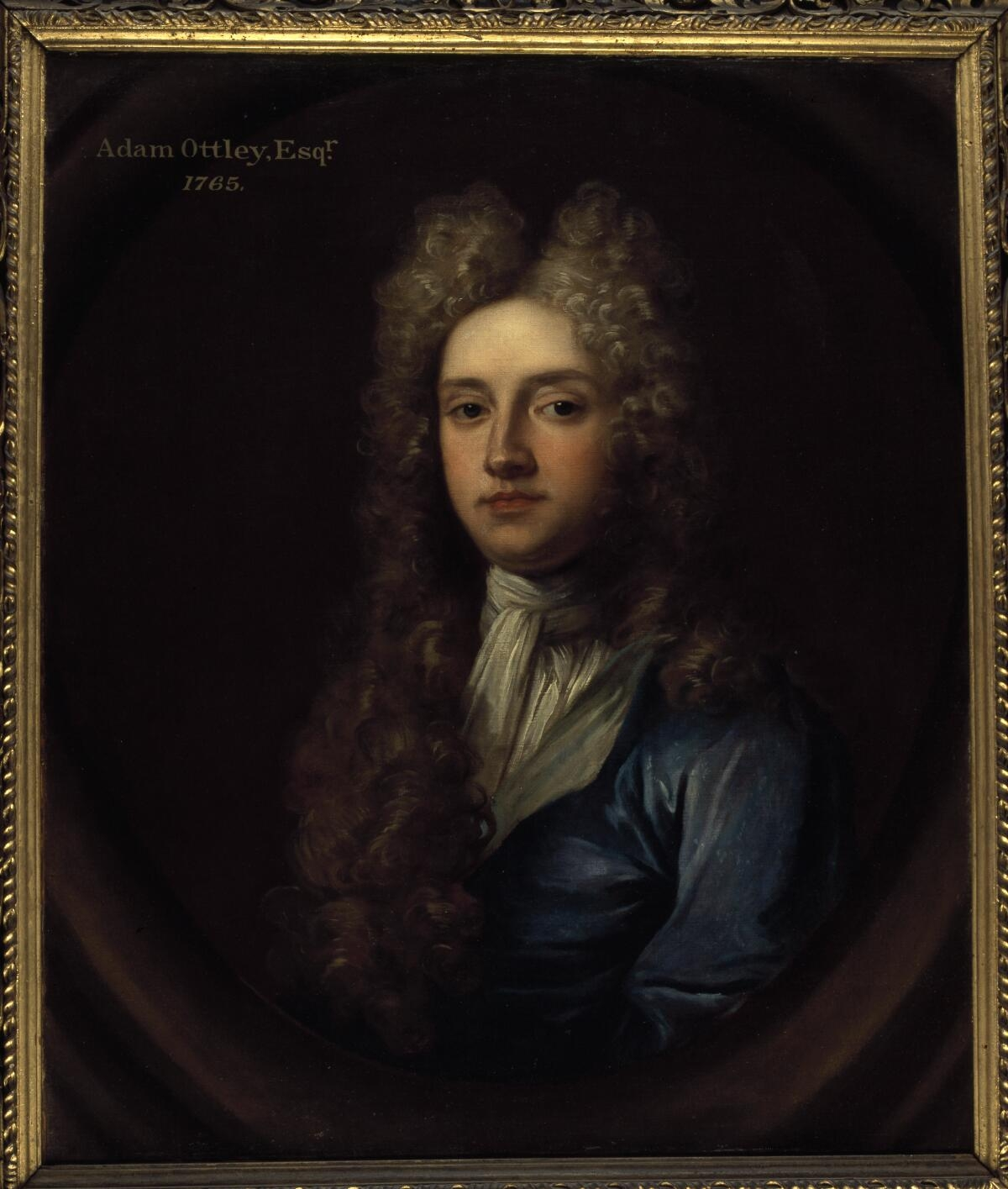
Adam Ottley

Adam Ottley (1655 – 3 October 1723) was an English churchman, Bishop of St David's from 1713 until his death.

== Life ==
He was the son of Sir Richard Ottley of Pitchford, Shropshire, and his wife, Lady Lettice Ridgeway, daughter of Robert Ridgeway, 2nd Earl of Londonderry. He was baptised on 5 January 1655 at Pitchford. He matriculated at Trinity College, Cambridge in 1672, graduating B.A. in 1676 and M.A. in 1679. He then became a Fellow of Trinity Hall, Cambridge (1680–1684), and graduated D.D. in 1690.

He became rector of Pontesbury, prebendary of Hereford Cathedral, and then Archdeacon of Shropshire. He was nominated to the see of St David's at the end of 1712, with support from James Brydges, 1st Duke of Chandos. An active diocesan bishop, he came into conflict with Griffith Jones.

== Notes ==
Church of England titles
Preceded by Philip Bisse	Bishop of St David's; 1713–1723	Succeeded by Richard Smalbroke
