= Church of St James, Kinnersley =

Coordinates: 52.141°N 2.9577°W

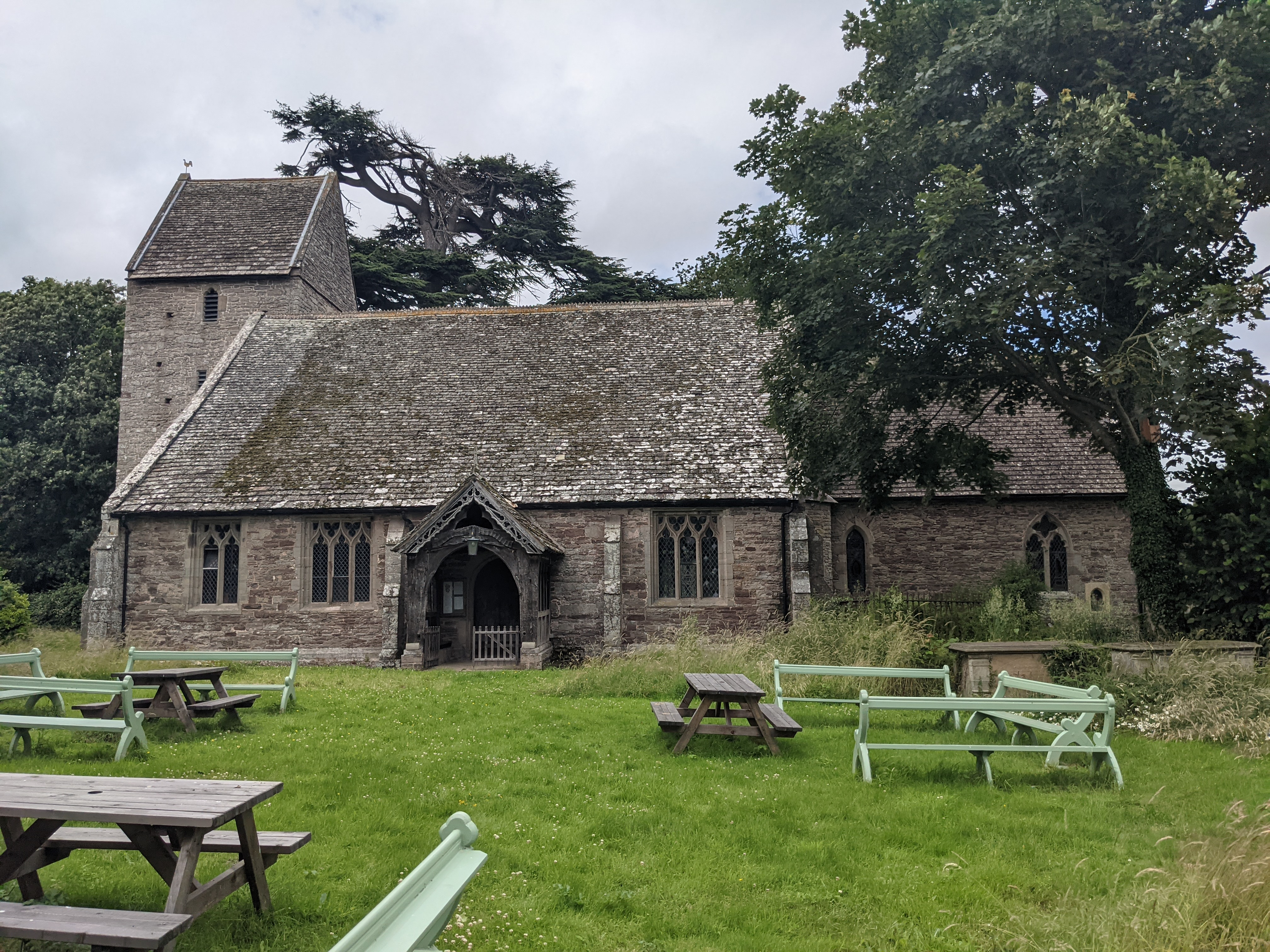
- A Grade I listed church with decoration by George Frederick Bodley

- Location in Herefordshire
- Location: Kinnersley, Herefordshire
- Country: England
- Denomination: Anglican

History
- Status: Parish church

Architecture
- Functional status: Active
- Heritage designation: Grade I
- Designated: 2 September 1966
- Architectural type: Church

Administration
- Diocese: Diocese of Hereford
- Parish: Kinnersley

Clergy
- Vicar: Rev. Janet Greenfield

The Church of St James is a Church of England parish church at Kinnersley in the English county of Herefordshire. It is a Grade I listed building.

== History ==
The Church of St James dates from the 12th, 13th and 14th centuries. It was restored in 1868 by Thomas Nicholson. From 1873, interior decoration was designed by George Frederick Bodley and carried out by the Reverend Frederick Andrews. In the previous year, Bodley had married Minna Reavely; (Note: At the time of their marriage, Bodley was 45 while Minna was 21. Her lively personality contributed to a contented partnership; Ninian Comper and Charles Robert Ashbee, both of whom trained in Bodley's office, recorded their impressions of their master's wife. Ashbee described her as "a lively and amusing lady", while Comper thought her looks similar to those of Ellen Terry.) the Reavely family were the owners of Kinnersley Castle, immediately adjacent to the church. Bodley was buried in the churchyard at St James', following his death in 1907. The church remains an active parish church in the Diocese of Hereford. The building suffered deterioration in the 21st century; the roof has now been repaired but the ingress of water caused damp which has damaged the interior decoration. The church is currently on the Heritage at Risk Register.

== Architecture and description ==
The design of the church is unusual. Its "most impressive" element is the, almost detached, tower, constructed in the 14th century. The body of the church is simple, a chancel dating from c.1300, with a north aisle and an arcade. The interior has waggon roofs, with "rich" decoration designed by Bodley and executed by Andrews. It includes much multi-coloured stenciling. Alan Brooks, in the 2012 revised Herefordshire volume of the Buildings of England series, describes the decoration as "particularly fine". St James is a Grade I listed building. The church contains some notable monuments, including one of the mid-17th century to Francis Smallman and his wife Susan, which Pevsner attributes to Samuel Baldwin.

The war memorial in the churchyard is designed in the form of an obelisk and commemorates the men of the village who died in both the First and the Second World Wars. It is a Grade II listed structure. Bodley's grave, which is also listed at Grade II, is close to that of his collaborator on the interior decoration of the church, the Rev. Frederick Andrews.

== Gallery ==
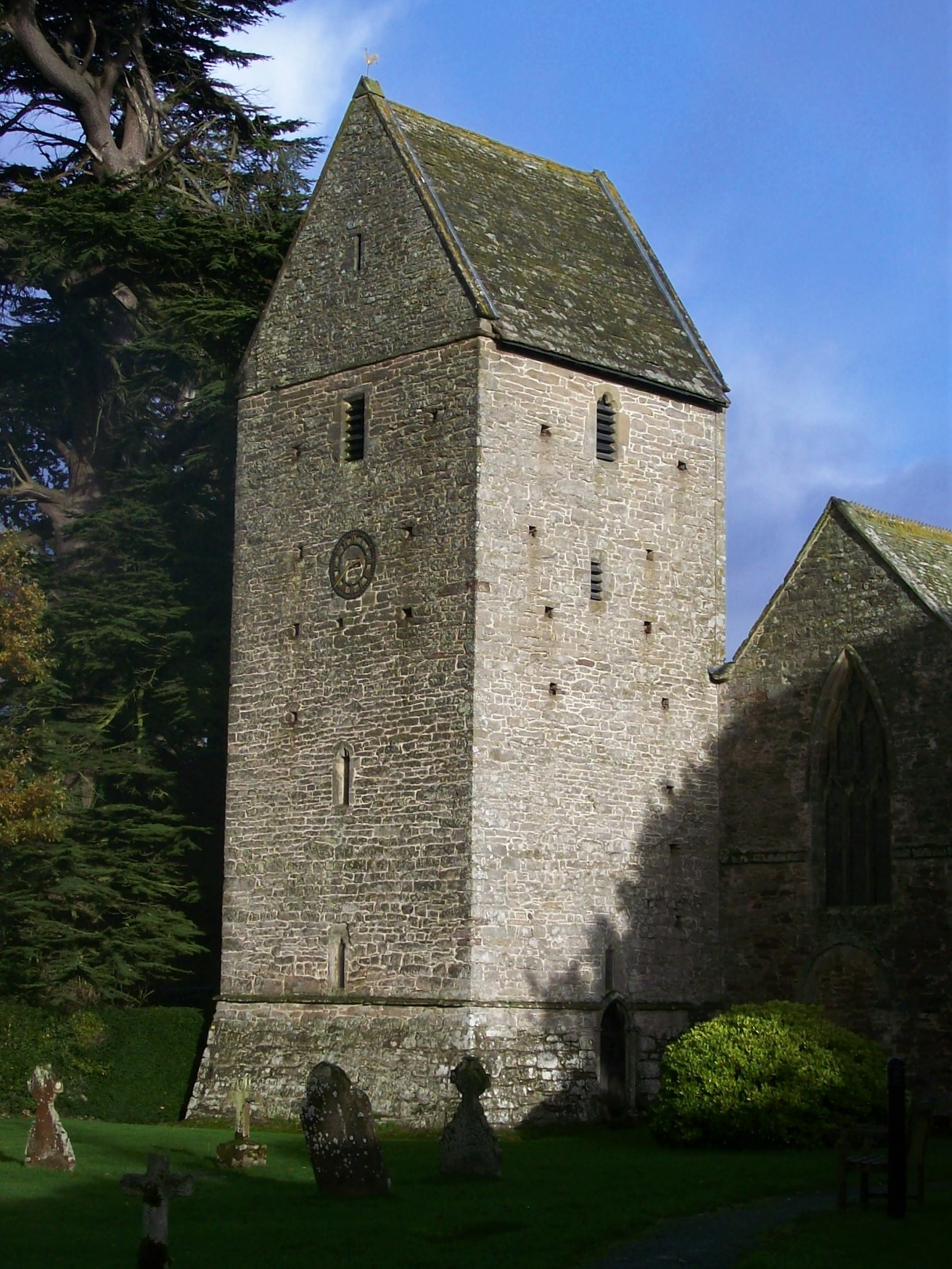
"The most impressive feature, the sheer NW tower"

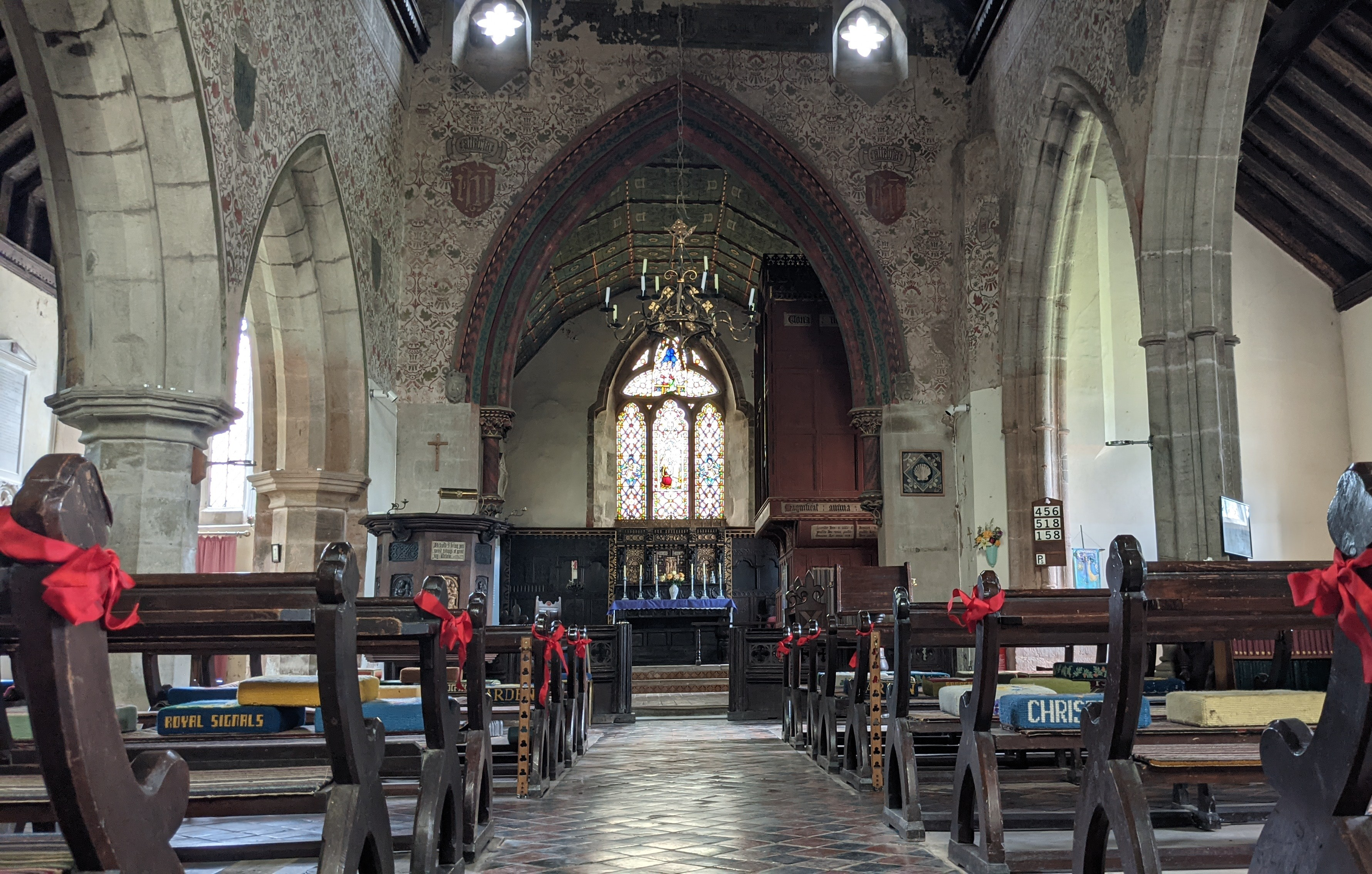
The church interior

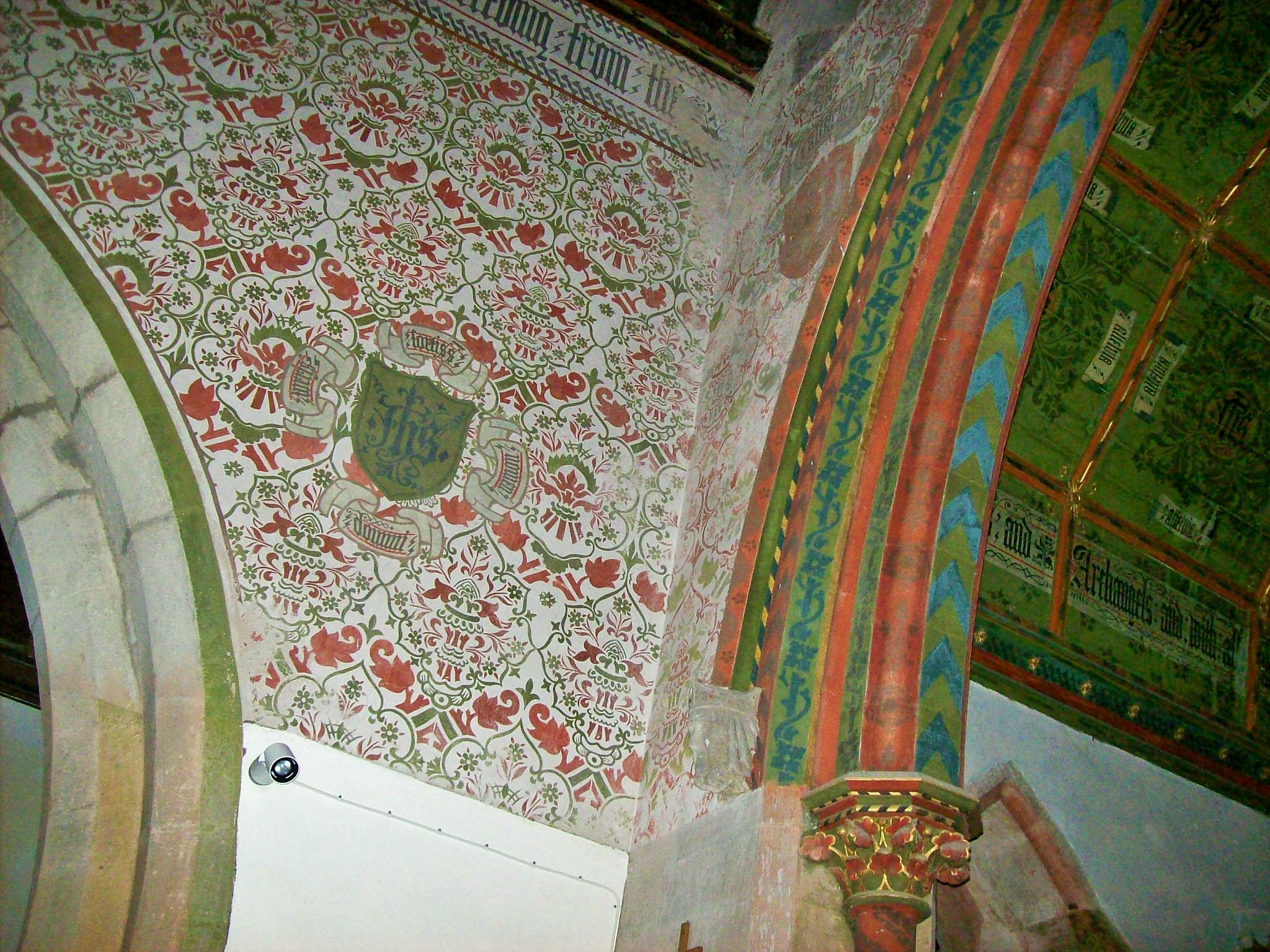
Decorative stencilwork designed by Bodley and worked by Rev. Frederick Andrews

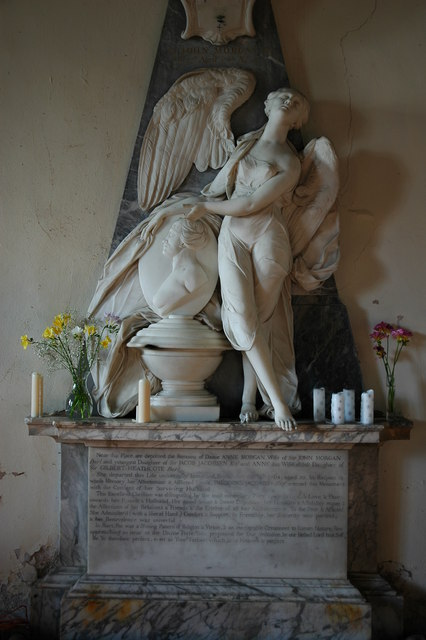
Monument to Dame Anne Morgan

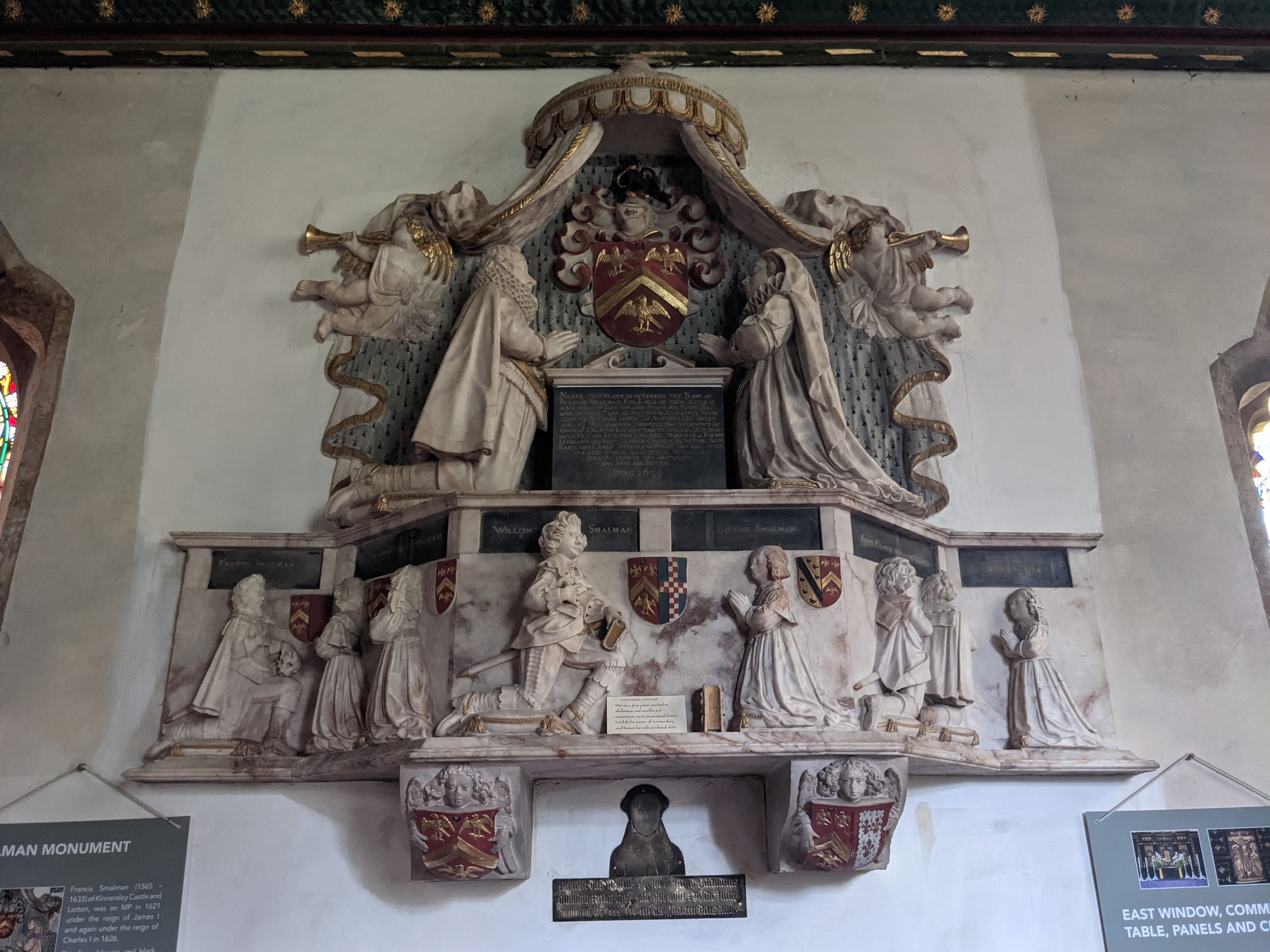
Smalman Monument

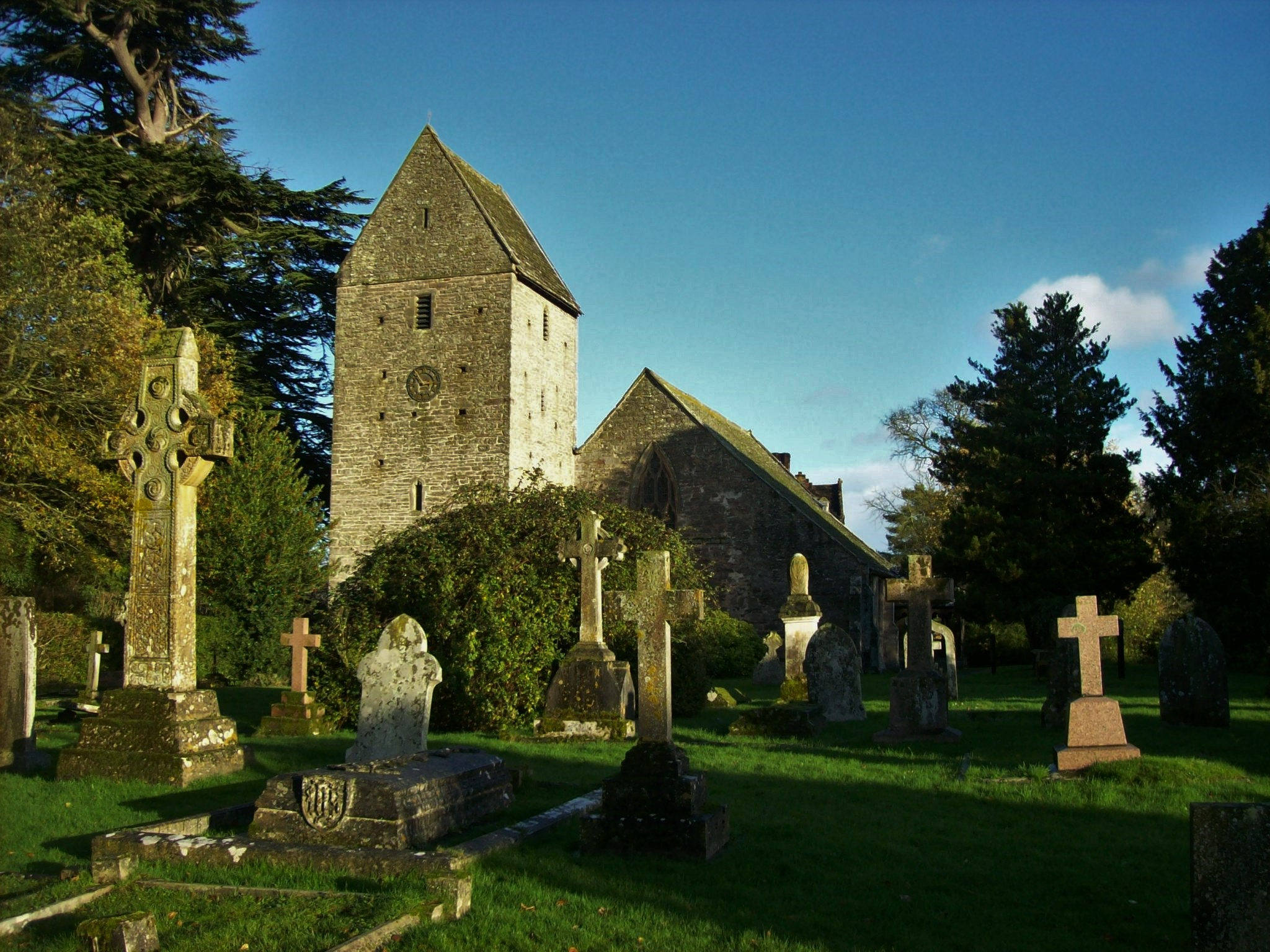
The church in its churchyard

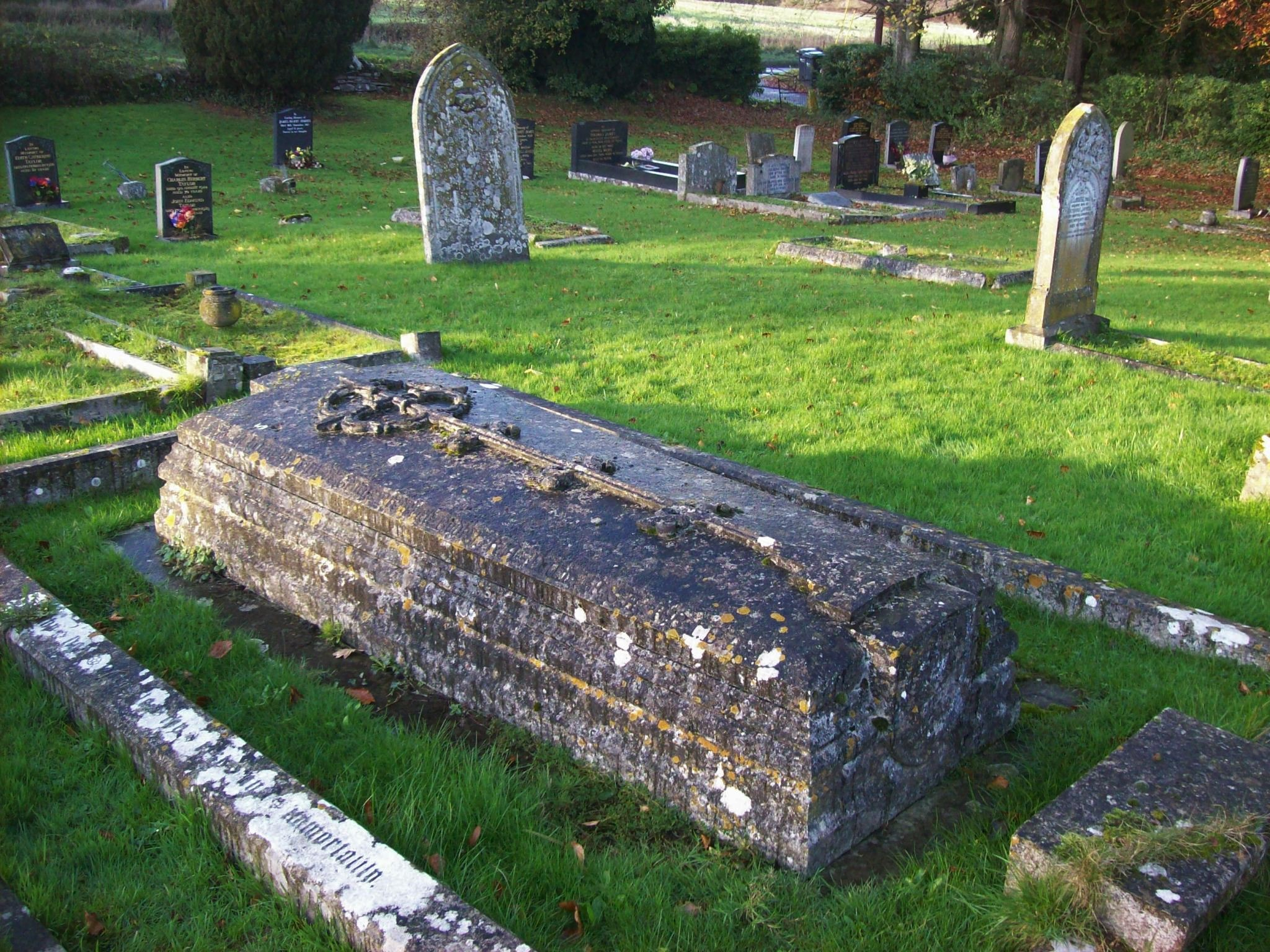
Bodley's grave

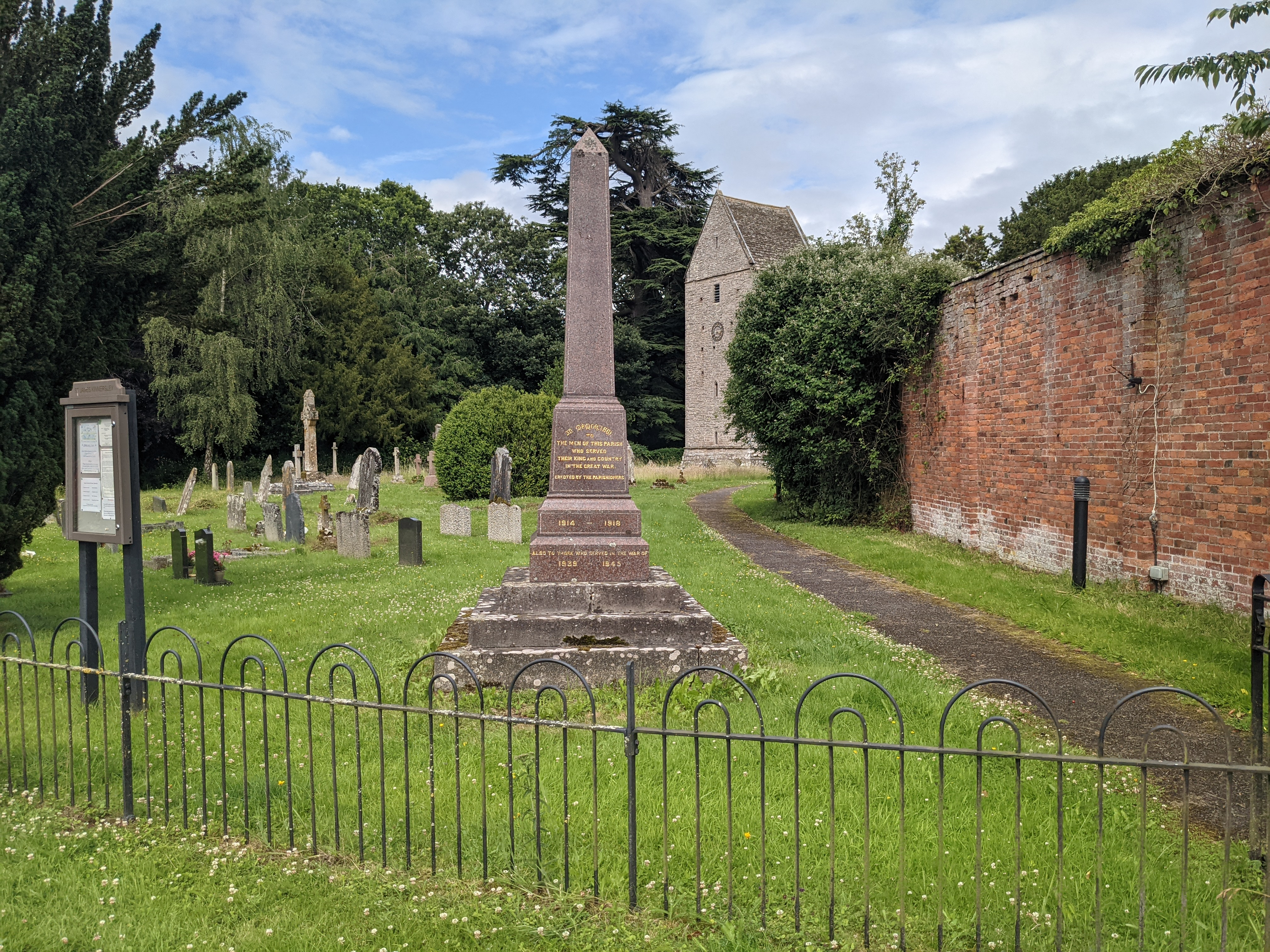
The Grade II listed war memorial

== Sources ==
- Brooks, Alan; Pevsner, Nikolaus (2012). Herefordshire. The Buildings of England. New Haven, US and London: Yale University Press. ISBN 978-0-300-12575-7. OCLC 759174126.
- Hall, Michael (2014). George Frederick Bodley and the later Gothic Revival in Britain and America. New Haven, US and London: Yale University Press. ISBN 978-0-300-20802-3. OCLC 983761471.
