= Lawley =

Lawley may refer to:

== Places ==
- Lawley, Shropshire, England
- Lawley, Gauteng, South Africa
- Lawley Street railway station, in Birmingham, England
- Mount Lawley, Western Australia
  - Mount Lawley Senior High School
  - Mount Lawley railway station

== Other uses ==
- Lawley (surname)
