= Anthony Bourchier =

16th-century English politician

Anthony Bourchier (by 1521–1551) was an English politician who was a Member of the Parliament of England during the Tudor Era.

== Origins ==
Anthony Bourchier was born c. 1521 to Maurice Bouchier and Joan.

== Career ==
Anthony first came to prominence in November 1544 when he was appointed principal auditor to the household of Queen Catherine Parr. He would also be appointed to her council in December of that year. He remained in the Queen's service even into her widowhood and during her marriage to Lord Sudely.

It was from the Queen's patronage that Anthony became a member (MP) of the Parliament of England for New Shoreham in 1547.

== Marriage and issue ==
Anthony married Thomasine Mildmay, a sister of Sir Walter Mildmay and Thomas Mildmay. This union produced at least one son, Thomas, and a daughter, Mary, wife of Thomas Fanshawe, who survived him.
