= Sir Thomas Lawley, 3rd Baronet =

English politician

Sir Thomas Lawley, 3rd Baronet (ca. 1650–1729) was an English politician who sat in the House of Commons from 1684 to 1689.

Lawley was the son of Sir Francis Lawley, 2nd Baronet and his wife Anne Whitmore, daughter of Sir Thomas Whitmore, 1st Baronet of Apley.

In 1685, Lawley was elected Member of Parliament for Wenlock and held the seat until 1689. He succeeded to the baronetcy on the death of his father in 1696.

Lawley married firstly Rebecca Winch, daughter of Sir Humphrey Winch, 1st Baronet, of Everton, Huntingdonshire and his wife Rebecca Browne and had fourteen children, eleven of whom died young. He married secondly Elizabeth Perkins, a widow and had a son and daughter. He was succeeded in the baronetcy by his only surviving son by his first wife, Robert. One of his two surviving daughters by his first marriage, Elizabeth, married as her second husband Sir Nicholas Lawes, Governor of Jamaica. Their descendants included Anne, Duchess of Cumberland and Strathearn.

Parliament of England
Preceded by John Wolryche; William Forester	Member of Parliament for Wenlock; 1685–1689; With: George Weld	Succeeded by George Weld; William Forester
Baronetage of England
Preceded by Francise Lawley	Baronet (of Spoonhill); 1696–1729	Succeeded by Robert Lawley
