= Francis Smallman =

English politician

Francis Smallman (c. 1565 – 7 September 1633) was an English politician who sat in the House of Commons in 1621 and 1626.

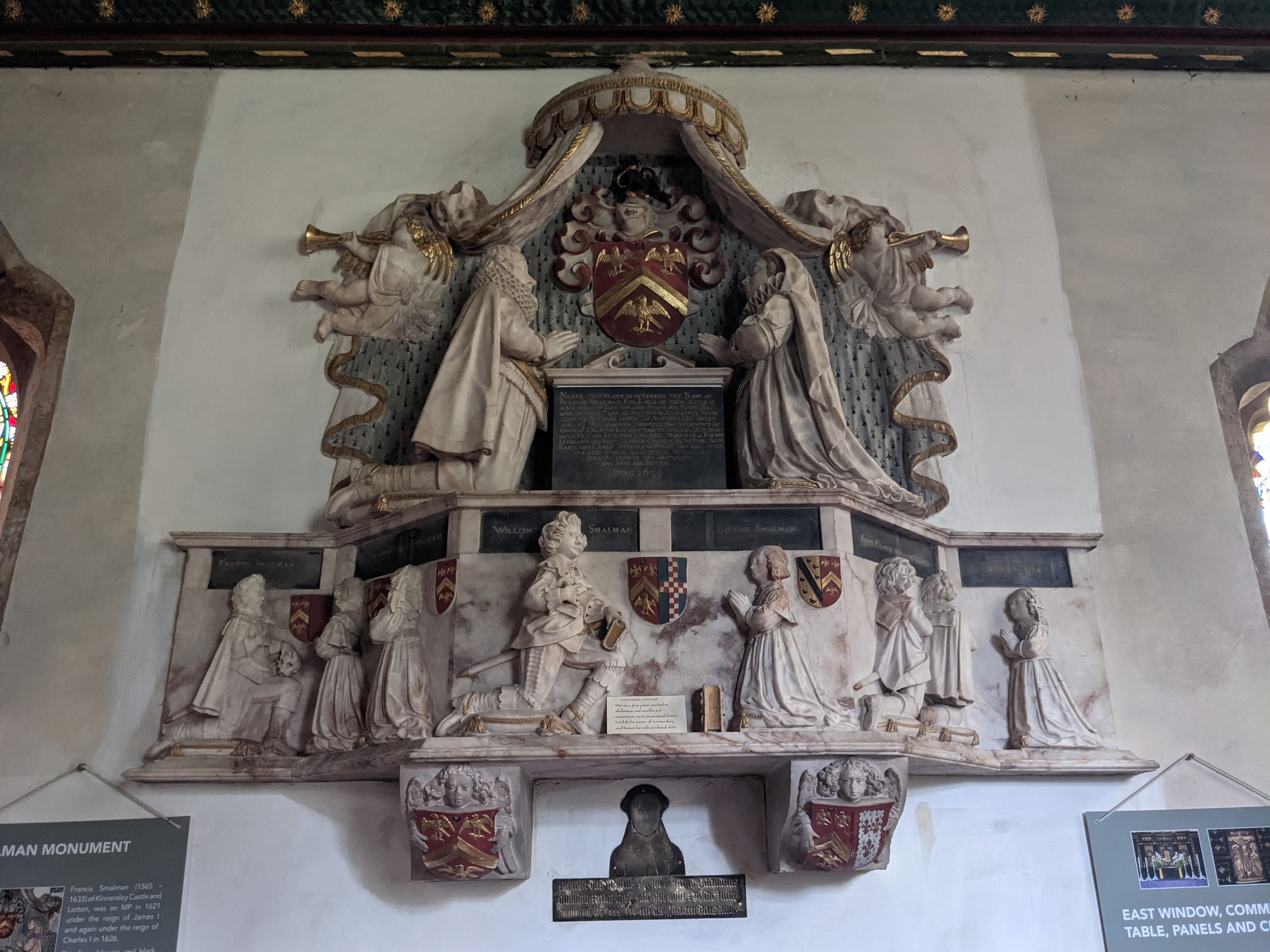
Monument to Francis Smallman in the Church of St James, Kinnersley

Smallman was the son of Francis Smallman and his wife Elizabeth Hopton. He was a lawyer and acquired Kinnersley Castle, serving as High Sheriff of Herefordshire for 1614–15.

In 1621, Smallman was elected Member of Parliament for Leominster. He was elected MP for Wenlock in 1626.

Smallman married firstly Elizabeth Craft widow of George Craft and daughter of Stockmede, by whom he had children Francis, Jane, and Jone. He married secondly Susan Clarke, widow of John Clarke of London and daughter of Fabian of Essex by whom he had two children William and Alice.

Parliament of England
Preceded by Sir Ralph Coningsby; William Beecher	Member of Parliament for Leominster; 1621; With: William Beecher	Succeeded by James Tomkins; William Beecher
Preceded by Thomas Lawley; Thomas Woolrich	Member of Parliament for Wenlock; 1626; With: Thomas Lawley	Succeeded by Thomas Lawley; George Bridgmant
