= William Blount (MP for Much Wenlock) =

Member of the Parliament of England

William Blount (c.1514-1544 or later), was an English Member of Parliament.

He was a Member (MP) of the Parliament of England for (MUch) Wenlock in 1542.He was the brother of Bessie Blount and the uncle and servant of the illegitimate son of Henry VIII, Henry Fitzroy, Duke of Richmond.
