= Sir Thomas Lawley, 1st Baronet =

English politician

Sir Thomas Lawley, 1st Baronet (died 19 October 1646) was an English politician who sat in the House of Commons between 1625 and 1629.

Lawley was the son of Francis Lawley of Spoonhill near Much Wenlock, Shropshire and his wife Elizabeth Newport, daughter of Sir Richard Newport. Lawley succeeded to the estate at Spoonhill on the death of his brother in 1623. He was a member of the Worshipful Company of Drapers. In 1625, he was elected Member of Parliament for Wenlock. He was re-elected MP for Wenlock in 1626 and in 1628 and sat until 1629 when King Charles decided to rule without parliament for eleven years.

Lawley acquired the estate of Twickenham Meadows in 1638. In 1639, he was elected Sheriff of London, but never served. He was elected an alderman of the City of London for Castle Baynard ward in 1641. He was created baronet of Spoonhill, Shropshire, on 14 August 1641. He was Master of the Drapers Company for 1642 to 1643.

Lawley married Anne Manning. Lawley was succeeded in the baronetcy by his son Francis. His widow married John Glynne.

Parliament of England
Preceded by Henry Mytton; Thomas Woolrich	Member of Parliament for Wenlock; 1625–1629; With: Thomas Woolrich 1625; Francis Smallman 1626; George Bridgmant 1628–1629	Parliament suspended until 1640
Baronetage of England
New creation	Baronet (of Spoonhill); 1641–1646	Succeeded by Francis Lawley
