= John Foster (by 1508 – between 1547 and 1551) =

English politician

John Foster or Forester (by 1508 – between 1547 and 1551), of Wellington, Shropshire, was an English politician.

== Family ==
Foster was the son of John Foster of Wellington and his wife, Anne née Banester, a daughter of Thomas Banester of Hadnall. Foster was married twice: first to Alice née Charlton, a daughter of Thomas Charlton of Apley Castle, with whom he had one daughter. His second wife was Isabel née Lister, a daughter of William Lister of Rowton, Shropshire, with whom he had two sons.

== Career ==
He was a patten-maker or a mercer. He was a Member (MP) of the Parliament of England for Much Wenlock in 1529.

Parliament of England
Preceded by ? ?	Member of Parliament for Much Wenlock; 1529; With: Edward Hall	Succeeded by ? ?
