= John Wolryche =

English lawyer and politician

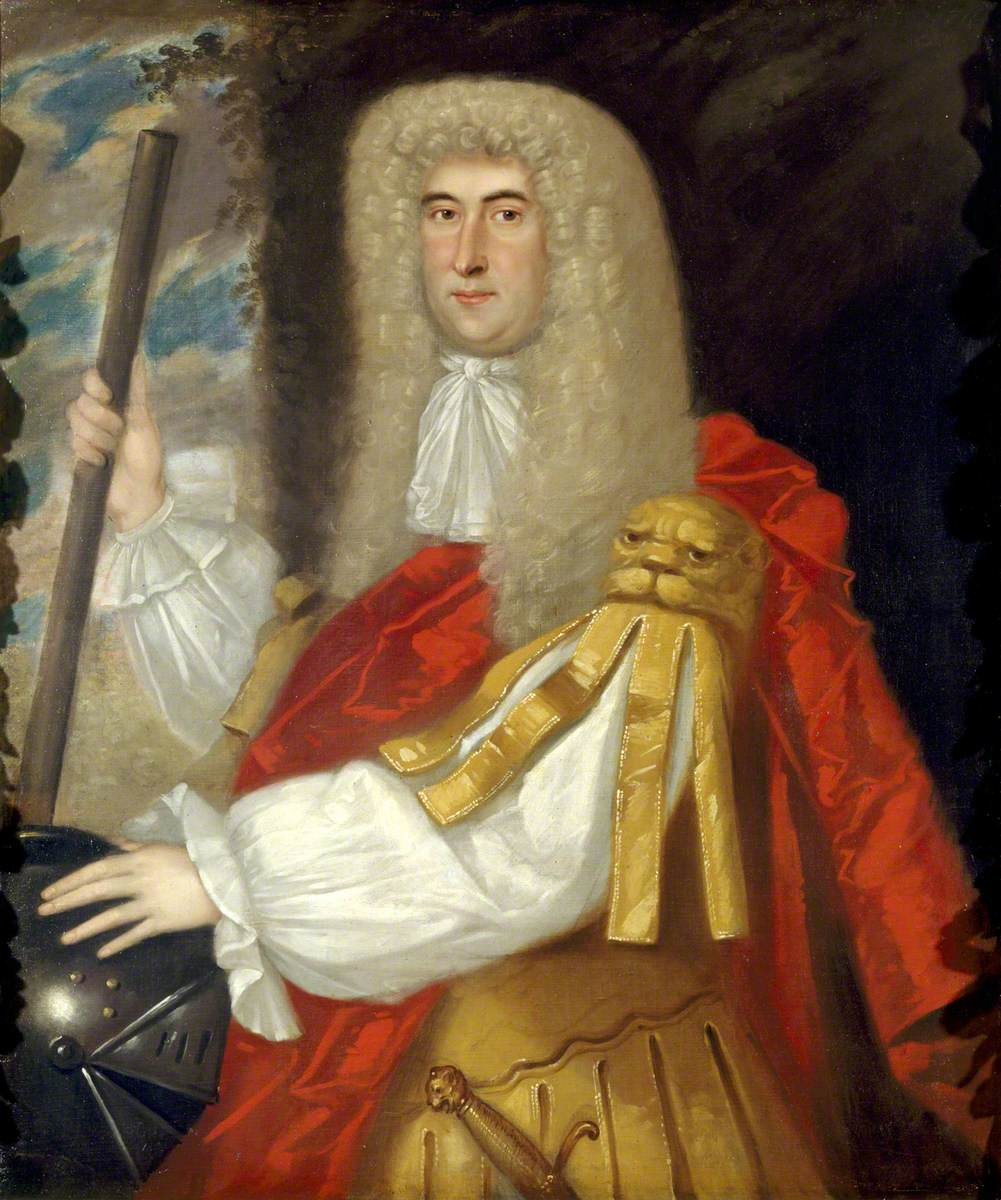
Portrait of John Wolryche, c.1680

John Wolryche (c.1637–1685) was a lawyer and politician of landed gentry background who represented Much Wenlock in the House of Commons of England in two parliaments of Charles II. He was a moderate Whig, opposing the succession of James II but avoiding involvement in conspiracies.

== Background and education ==
John Wolryche was the 5th son, but 3rd surviving son, of

- Thomas Wolryche of Dudmaston Hall, near Bridgnorth, a substantial landowner in south and east Shropshire. Initially a client of his uncle, Edward Bromley, Wolryche had been MP for Much Wenlock. He became an ardent royalist in the English Civil War and was military governor of Bridgnorth, before being sequestered and forced to compound for £730.
- Ursula Ottley, daughter of Thomas Ottley of Pitchford, Shropshire. She was a sister of Francis Ottley, a key leader in the royalist seizure of power in Shropshire and military governor of Shrewsbury

John Wolryche was educated initially at the grammar school in Stone, Staffordshire. He was admitted as a pensioner, i.e. a fee-paying student, at Christ's College, Cambridge, aged 16, on 19 May 1653 – a fair guide to his birth date. He matriculated in the same year and went on to graduate BA in 1656-7.

== Legal training and career ==
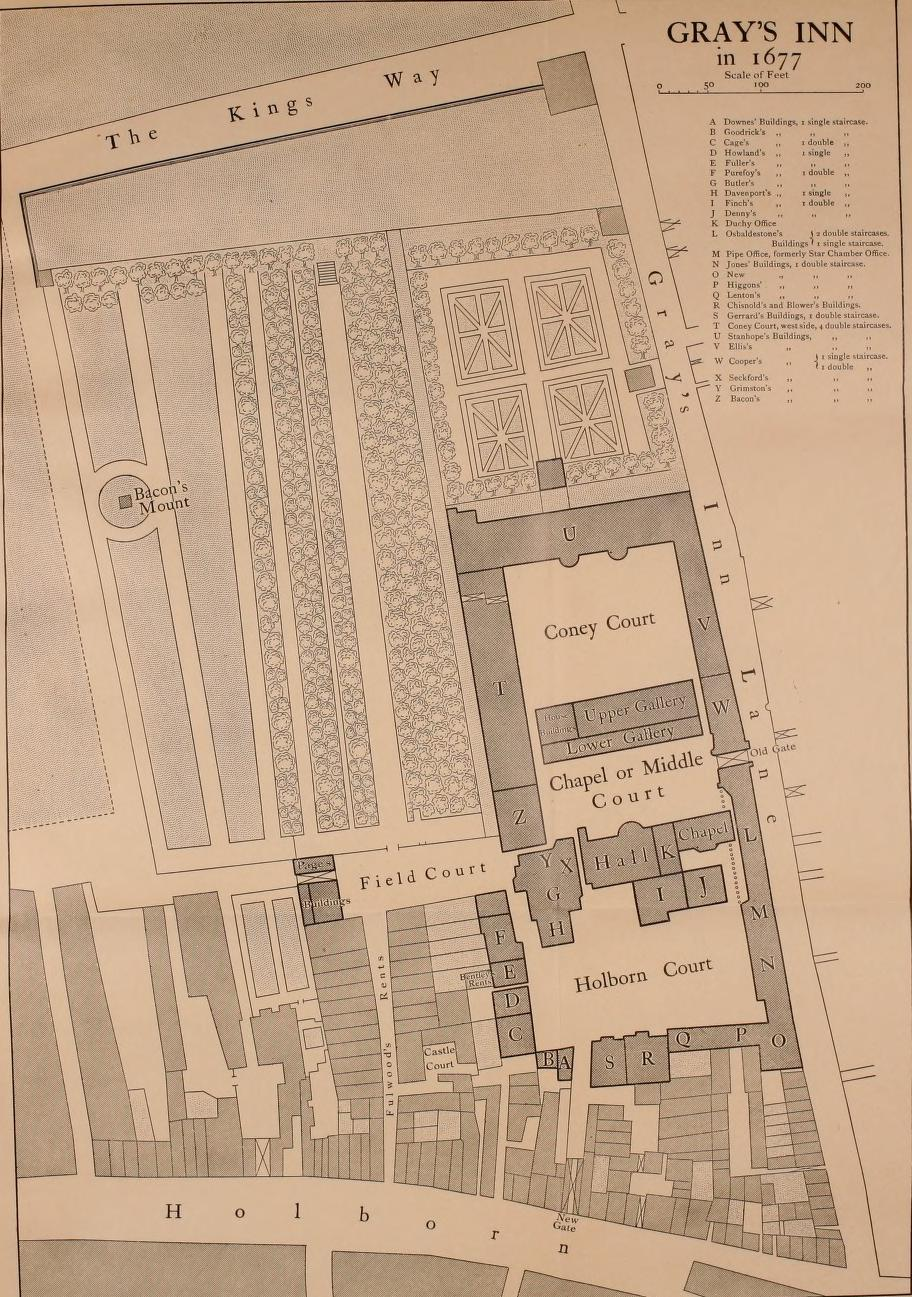
Map of Gray's Inn as it was in 1677. Cage's Buildings, where Wolryche had a chamber, is C at the south western corner of Holborn Court.

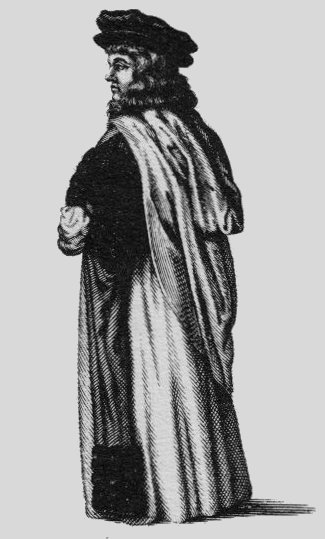
An Oxford Doctor of Civil Law, in Convocation dress, from David Loggan's 1675 engraving Oxonia Illustrata.

While he was still completing his Cambridge degree, Wolryche's name was entered on the admission register at Gray's Inn on 6 December 1655. This was an unusual choice for his family: his father, Edward Bromley, Francis Ottley and many other relatives were members of the Inner Temple. Unlike Sir Thomas, John Wolryche was not expecting to become a major landowner and took his legal studies seriously.

On 25 November 1661, the Pension or governing council ordered that Wolryche be called to the bar, as part of a large batch of students, on condition that he deposit £4 as surety for performing his bar moot. He seems to have taken chambers at his Inn: he was listed as occupying a room on the third storey of Cage's Buildings in 1668. In 1670 he received the degree of Doctor of Civil Law from Oxford University. In 1676 he was appointed recorder of Bridgnorth – a post he held until his death. On 26 November 1680 the Pension of Gray's Inn admitted him to the Grand Company of Ancients, its body of most learned and experienced members.

== Landowner ==
Woolrich's Estate Act 1672
- Act of Parliament
- Parliament of England
- Long title: An Act for confirming of an Award made by Sir Orlando Bridgman Knight and Baronet, late Lord Keeper of the Great Seal of England, for the ending of all Differences in the Family of Sir Thomas Wolrych Knight and Baronet, deceased; and to enable John Wolrych Esquire and his Heirs to execute the Powers in the said Award mentioned.
- Citation: 25 Cha. 2. c. 6 Pr.

Dates
- Royal assent: 29 March 1673

Sir Thomas Wolryche had owned about 6,000 acres, centred on his seat of Dudmaston, at Quatt, to the south of Bridgnorth. The estates were destined for his eldest son, Francis Wolryche, but he was considered incapable of managing them because of mental illness. Hence Sir Thomas settled them on John in trust. Sir Thomas died in 1668 and John Wolryche obtained a private act of Parliament in 1673, Woolrich's Estate Act 1672 (25 Cha. 2. c. 6 Pr.), to confirm his position. Dudmaston was a substantial property, probably a fortified manor house, rated for taxation purposes as having 24 hearths in 1673. John Wolryche began building a new house near Quatt church in the 1680s but it was not completed in his lifetime and ultimately became the dower house. The present hall was built for his son, Thomas, in the 1690s.

From 1668 Wolryche played a more significant role in the county, taking positions appropriate to his status as a prominent landowner. In 1669 he was made a freeman of Bridgnorth. The following year he became a Justice of the Peace. He was a commissioner for assessment, a key post in imposing taxation locally, from 1673 to 1680. Like his father, he became a captain of the militia, a post that led to his appointment as a Deputy Lieutenant of Shropshire in 1683.

== Political career ==
=== Candidate at Bridgnorth ===
Wolryche first stood for Parliament on 21 February 1679 at Bridgnorth, where he had been recorder, or chief legal official, a post which might have been expected to give him an advantage. However, in standing for election he was challenging the might of the Whitmores. Wolryche's father, Sir Thomas, had been a close friend and business partner of Sir Thomas Whitmore, 1st Baronet: Whitmore resided at Bridgnorth Castle while Wolryche was governor of the town. This association was not inherited by the next generation. Sir William Whitmore, 2nd Baronet had represented Bridgnorth in the House of Commons ever since 1661 and was to do so until his death in 1699: he regarded the borough seats as at his disposal. His brother, Sir Thomas Whitmore, had taken the second seat in a by-election in 1663, after a fierce contest, in which 182 new freemen were made in the six weeks before the poll. There seems to have been similar chicanery on this occasion, as Wolryche submitted a petition complaining of manipulation by the bailiffs after his defeat, but it was not reported.

The Whitmores were both broadly acceptable to the court and Thomas especially was reviled by Shaftesbury, who was working for the exclusion of Charles II's Catholic brother, James, Duke of York from succession to the throne. Wolryche stood explicitly for the "country party", opposed to the court.

=== MP for Much Wenlock ===
The short-lived Habeas Corpus Parliament of spring 1679 took the country further into political crisis and the king sought a way out of the impasse by calling for fresh elections in the summer. Wolryche had learnt from his earlier experience and decided to seek election elsewhere. Previously the Wolryche estates had been a key support to their parliamentary ambitions. Sir Thomas Wolryche had been MP in three parliaments for Much Wenlock, a constituency in which the Wolryches held two considerable estates: the large manor of Hughley and the nearby estate of Presthope. John too chose to try his luck electorally at Much Wenlock. At the February elections, Sir George Weld had stood in for his son, John, who was tainted by his support for the now disgraced Earl of Danby, and had been elected alongside the increasingly radical William Forester. Now Wolryche stood on slate with Forester, sharing electoral expenses, which totalled £124 9s. They used the same methods employed by their enemies, the Whitmores, having a large number of new burgesses enrolled. As a result, in an election held on 27 August, they defeated Weld and Sir Francis Lawley, 2nd Baronet. However, the parliament was prorogued and did not assemble until October of the following year.

In this Exclusion Bill Parliament, which lasted only three months, Wolryche was appointed to the important committee on elections and privileges, as well as a committee to investigate the Peyton affair. Sir Robert Peyton was a republican and member of the Green Ribbon Club, which had expelled him when he tried to reach a personal reconciliation with the Duke of York. Rash remarks he had made in the presence of Elizabeth Cellier then led to arrest for high treason, release, accusations of involvement in the "Meal Tub Plot", and subsequent appearance at the bar of the House of Commons. He was expelled from the House.

Wolryche was re-elected for Much Wenlock on 18 February 1681 and represented it in the so-called Oxford Parliament, which sat for just a week. Again he was accompanied by Forester, who was now deeply involved with Shaftesbury and the embryonic Whig party. He was once again named a member of the elections and privileges committee.

=== The Rye House Plot ===
The failure of the opposition to secure an exclusion bill was followed by the Rye House Plot, in which radical Whigs allegedly conspired to ambush the king and his brother. After the discovery of the plot in June 1683, Wolryche was one of the deputy lieutenants ordered to search for arms in Shropshire, despite his oppositional record. One of those implicated was Forester, who was found to have concealed a considerable quantity or arms and ammunition.

== Death ==
Wolryche survived for only a few months into the reign of James II. He died of smallpox and was buried in St Andrew's church at Quatt on 17 June 1685. His heir was his eldest son Thomas. However, as his elder brother Sir Francis had no male heirs, Thomas succeeded to both the lands and the title on his death in 1688.

== Marriage and family ==
Around 1670 Wolryche married Mary Griffith, daughter of Matthew Griffith (c.1599–1665). A militant and vituperative royalist, Griffith had been chaplain to Charles I during the civil war and was made master of the Temple Church in the reign of Charles II. Mary, according to her epitaph, was cultured and an accomplished singer and lutenist. She was about 33 years of age when she married Wolryche and was the widow of George Elphick, a Sussex landowner. She died in childbirth, aged 41, in 1678, and was commemorated by an impressive monument in Quatt parish church. She had already borne two sons, including Thomas, destined to become the third of the Wolryche baronets.

=== Family tree ===
John Wolryche and the succession of the Wolryche baronets

Sir Thomas Wolryche(1598–1668), 1st Baronet, MP for Much Wenlock	Ursula Ottley
Sir Francis Wolryche, 2nd Baronet (1627–88)	Elizabeth Wrottesley, daughter of Sir Walter Wrottesley, 1st Baronet	Margaret Wolryche (born 1626)	John Berington of Winsley, Hope under Dinmore, Herefordshire	JOHN WOLRYCHE (c.1637–85), MP for Much Wenlock	Mary Griffith, daughter of Matthew Griffith, royal chaplain.	Elizabeth Wolryche	Sir Walter Wrottesley (c.1632-c.1686), 2nd Baronet of Wrottesley Hall, Tettenhall, Staffordshire
Ursula Wolryche	Revd. William Wright	Mary Wolryche	John Grey (died 1709) of Enville Hall, Staffordshire and Bradgate House, Leicestershire, MP for Leicester and Staffordshire	Sir Thomas Wolryche (1672–1765), 3rd Baronet	Elizabeth Weld, daughter of George Weld of Willey, Shropshire	Wrottesley Baronets
Mary Grey	William Ward (1677–1720) of Willingsworth, Sedgley, Staffordshire, MP for Staffordshire	Sir John Wolryche (1691–1723), 4th Baronet
John Ward, 1st Viscount Dudley and Ward, MP for Newcastle-under-Lyme

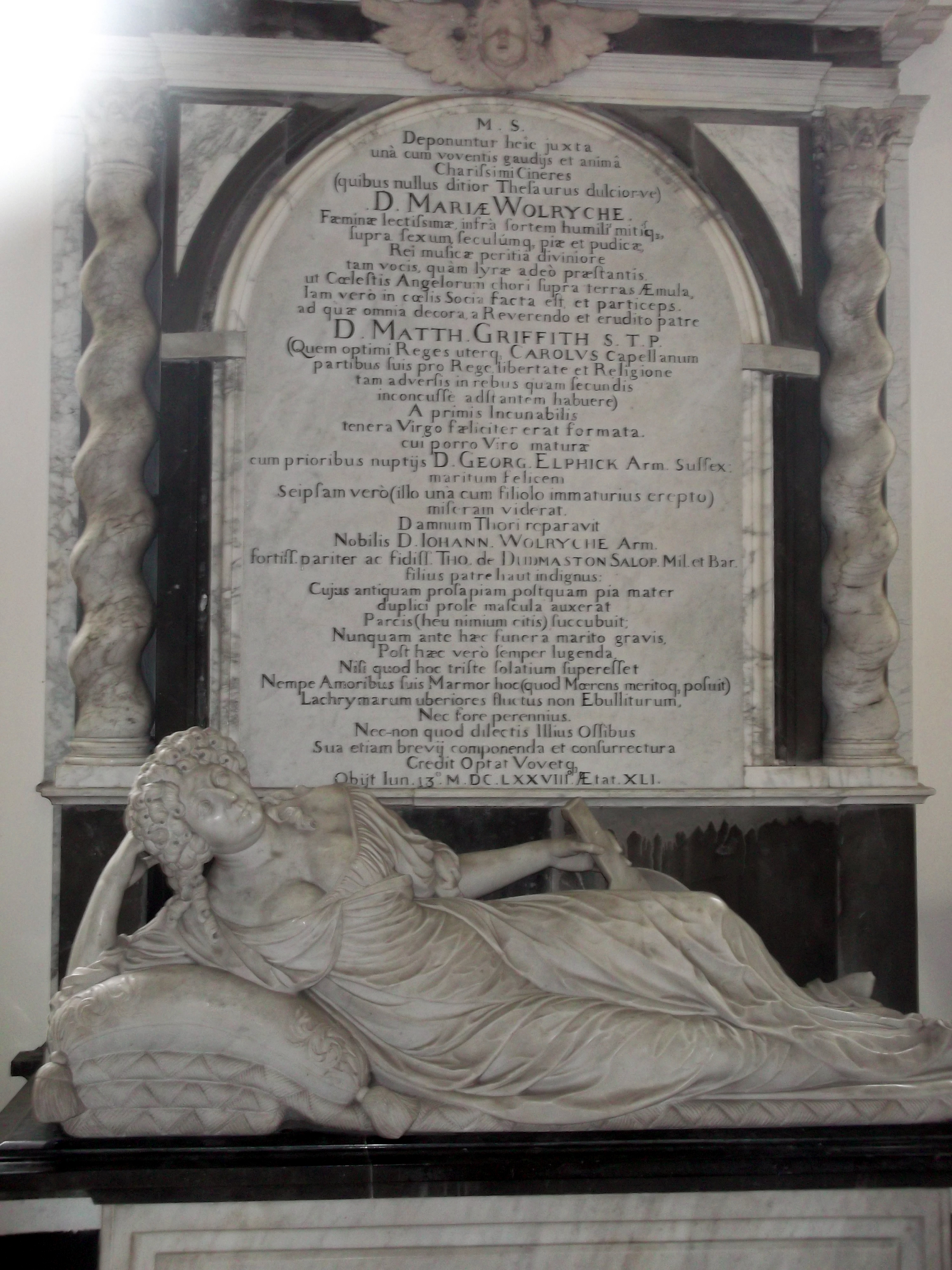
Monument to Mary Wolryche née Griffith (died 1678). St Andrew's church, Quatt.

== Notes ==
Parliament of England
Preceded by Sir John Weld; William Forester	Member of Parliament for Wenlock; 1679–85; With: William Forester	Succeeded by Thomas Lawley; George Weld
