= Richard Lawley =

English MP for Spoonhill and Much Wenlock

Richard Lawley (by 1515 – 1569), of Spoonhill and Much Wenlock, Shropshire, was an English Member of Parliament (MP).

He was a Member of the Parliament of England for Much Wenlock in 1545 and 1547.
