= Thomas Whitmore (1599–1677) =

English lawyer and politician

Thomas Whitmore (12 February 1599 – May 1677) was an English lawyer and politician who sat in the House of Commons from 1659.

Whitmore was the eldest son of John Whitmore of Ludstone, Claverley, Shropshire and his wife Frances Billingsley, daughter of William Billingsley of Astley, Shropshire. He matriculated at Wadham College, Oxford in February 1617. He entered Middle Temple from New Inn in February 1620 and was called to the bar in 1626.

He was sympathetic to the Royalist cause in the Civil War and in 1646 he was assessed at £300, later reduced to £60, by the committee for the advance of money. In 1648 he became a Bencher of Middle Temple. His father died the following year. He was made freeman of Bridgnorth in 1655 and was recorder of the town from 1655 to 1676. He was a J.P. for Shropshire from 1656 until his death and was made freeman of Wenlock in 1658. He also acted as an agent for his wealthier relations, including Sir George and Sir Thomas Whitmore.

In 1659, Whitmore was elected Member of Parliament for Wenlock in the Third Protectorate Parliament. He was re-elected MP for Wenlock in April 1660 for the Convention Parliament. On the Restoration, he was one of those proposed as Knight of the Royal Oak, with an annual income estimated at £600. He was recorder of Wenlock by April 1660, commissioner for oyer and terminer for the Oxford circuit in July 1660 and commissioner for assessment for Shropshire from August 1660 until his death. In 1662 he was commissioner for oyer and terminer for the Shropshire circuit and commissioner for corporations until 1663. He was commissioner for recusants in 1675.

Whitmore died at the age 78 and was buried at Claverley on 30 May 1677.

Whitmore married Anne Corbet (d. 1678), daughter of Thomas Corbet of Longnor, Shropshire. On his death without a direct heir, his estate descended to his nephew John Whitmore.

Parliament of England
Preceded by Not represented in Second Protectorate Parliament	Member of Parliament for Wenlock; 1659; With: Sir Francis Lawley, 2nd Baronet	Succeeded by Not represented in Restored Rump
