= Sir Francis Lawley, 2nd Baronet =

English courtier and politician

Sir Francis Lawley, 2nd Baronet Bt

Member of Parliament for Wenlock
- In office 1659–1659

Member of Parliament for Much Wenlock
- In office 1660–1660

Member of Parliament for Shropshire
- In office 1661–1679

Master of the Jewel Office
- In office 1690–1696

Personal details
- Born: c. 1630
- Died: October 25, 1696
- Spouse: Anne Whitmore
- Parent(s): Sir Thomas Lawley, 1st Baronet; Martha Gott
- Occupation: Courtier; politician
- Known for: MP for Wenlock, Much Wenlock, and Shropshire; Master of the Jewel Office

Sir Francis Lawley, 2nd Baronet (c. 1630 – 25 October 1696) was an English courtier and politician who sat in the House of Commons between 1659 and 1679.

Lawley was the son of Sir Thomas Lawley, 1st Baronet of Spoonhill, near Much Wenlock, Shropshire. He inherited the Baronetcy and the estate on the death of his father in 1646. Lawley acquired the estate of the dissolved monastery of Canwell, in the parish of Hints, Staffordshire, which became the family seat.

In 1659, Lawley was elected Member of Parliament for Wenlock in the Third Protectorate Parliament. He was elected MP for Much Wenlock again in 1660 to the Convention Parliament. In 1661, he was elected MP for Shropshire for the Cavalier Parliament and held the seat until 1679. From 1690 to 1696, he was Master of the Jewel Office.

Lawley married Anne Whitmore, daughter of Sir Thomas Whitmore, 1st Baronet of Apley. He was succeeded by his son Thomas.

Parliament of England
Vacant Not represented in Second Protectorate Parliament	Member of Parliament for Wenlock; 1659; With: Thomas Whitmore	Unknown
Unknown	Member of Parliament for Wenlock; 1660; With: Thomas Whitmore	Succeeded by Sir Thomas Littleton; George Weld
Preceded by Sir William Whitmore; Henry Vernon	Member of Parliament for Shropshire; 1661–1679; With: Sir Richard Ottley 1661–1670; Viscount Newport 1670–1679	Succeeded by Viscount Newport; Sir Vincent Corbet
Political offices
Preceded by Sir Gilbert Talbot	Master of the Jewel Office; 1690–1696	Succeeded by Heneage Montagu
Baronetage of England
Preceded by Thomas Lawley	Baronet (of Spoonhill); 1646–1696	Succeeded by Thomas Lawley
