= Henry Mytton =

New Zealand cricketer

Personal information
- Full name: Henry Whitehead Mytton
- Born: 16 September 1840; India
- Died: 6 July 1890 (aged 49)

Domestic team information
- Years: Team
- 1863/64–1866/67: Canterbury

Career statistics
Competition	First-class
Matches	2
Runs scored	13
Batting average	3.25
100s/50s	0/0
Top score	7
Catches/stumpings	0/–
- Source: ESPNcricinfo, 17 October 2020

Henry Whitehead Mytton (16 September 1840 – 6 July 1890) was a New Zealand cricketer. He played in two first-class matches for Canterbury from 1863 to 1867.
