= William Lacon =

16th-century English politician

William Lacon (ca. 1540 – before 1609), of Willey, Shropshire, was an English politician.

Lacon was a member of parliament for Much Wenlock in 1571 and 1597.
