= Thomas Lawley (MP died 1559) =

Thomas Lawley (died 1559), of Much Wenlock, Shropshire, was an English Member of Parliament (MP) and merchant.

He was a Member of the Parliament of England for Much Wenlock in 1547 and March 1553.
