= Ellerdine Halt railway station =

Disused railway station in Shropshire, England

Ellerdine Halt
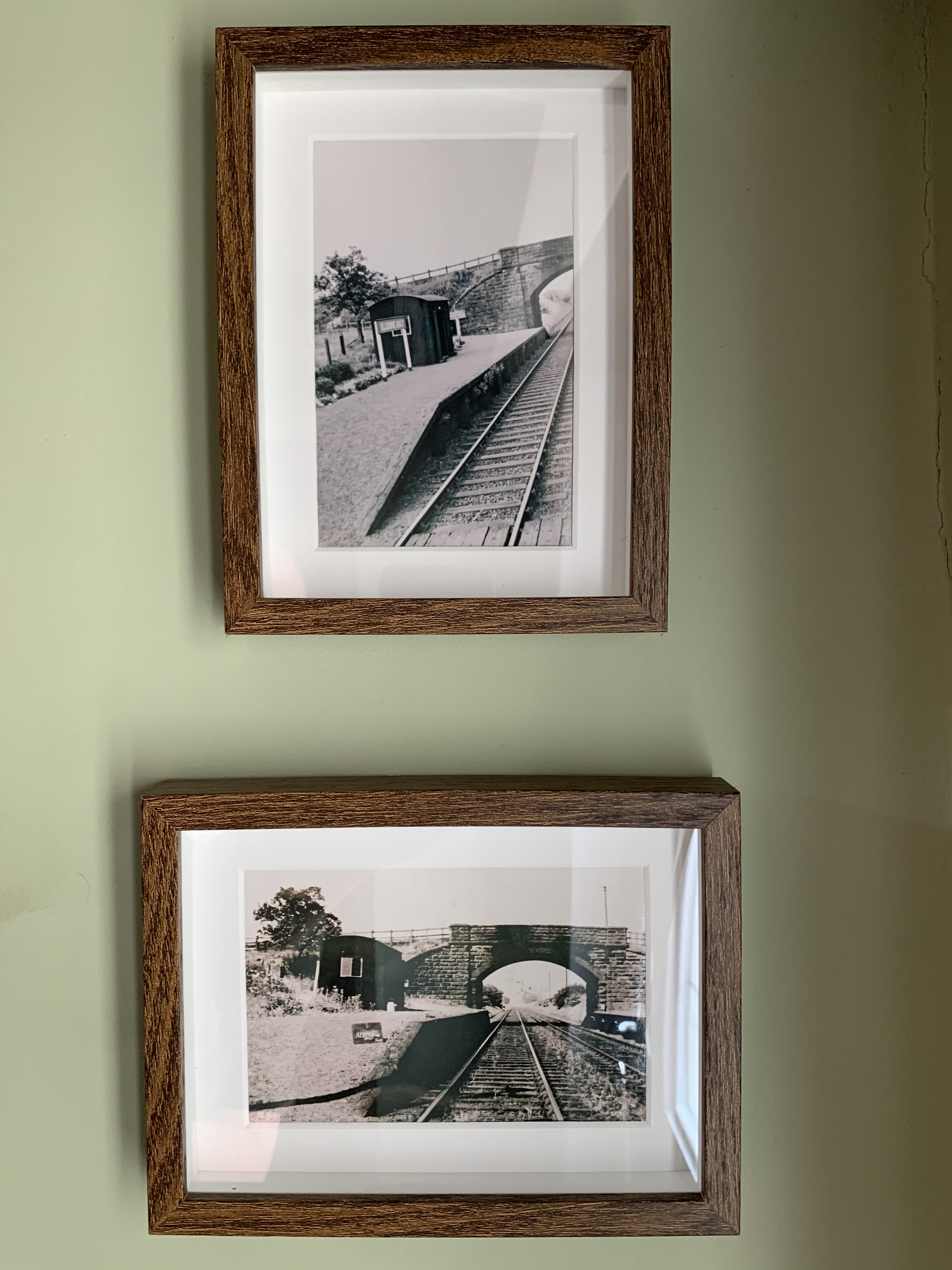
- Ellerdine Halt platform photographs. They show how the station looked whilst operational. The top photograph is dated 30/05/1961 and the bottom circa 1964.

General information
- Location: Cold Hatton, Shropshire; England
- Coordinates: 52.7856°N 2.5546°W
- Grid reference: SJ626219
- Platforms: 2

Other information
- Status: Disused

History
- Post-grouping: Great Western Railway

Key dates
- 7 June 1930: Opened
- 9 September 1963: Closed
Location

Ellerdine Halt railway station was a station in Cold Hatton, Shropshire, England. The station was opened in 1930 and closed in 1963. The station was named for the nearby hamlet of Ellerdine.

| Preceding station | Disused railways | Following station |
|---|---|---|
| Peplow; Line and station closed | Great Western Railway; Wellington and Drayton Railway | Rowton Halt; Line and station closed |
