= Rowton, Shropshire =

Village in Shropshire, England

Coordinates: 52.776°N 2.577°W

Rowton
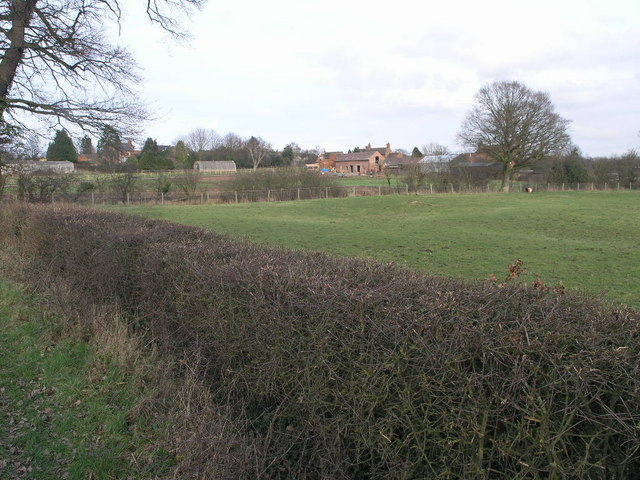
- Rowton, viewed from the west

- Location within Shropshire
- OS grid reference: SJ610200
- Civil parish: Ercall Magna
- Unitary authority: Telford and Wrekin
- Ceremonial county: Shropshire
- Region: West Midlands
- Country: England
- Sovereign state: United Kingdom
- Post town: TELFORD
- Postcode district: TF6
- Dialling code: 01952
- Police: West Mercia
- Fire: Shropshire
- Ambulance: West Midlands
- UK Parliament: The Wrekin

Rowton is a small village in the Telford and Wrekin Borough, Shropshire, England. It is located seven miles north-west of Wellington. The area is a Chapelry Division of High Ercall Parish.

== History ==
The area was known as Retina in Roman times, later the name changed to Rutone and then to Ruton. In the Domesday Book it is recorded as Rugheton.

In 1876 a meteorite was observed to fall and recovered. It was described in a 2012 BBC web article as "significant" in the study of how the solar system formed."

Rowton Brewery was established in October 2008 .

== Religion ==
The village church of All Hallows is a medieval foundation, which was reconstructed in 1881 by the architect Geoffrey Smith. He widened the original building to accommodate a larger congregation and today almost no original masonry survives. It is recorded that Rowton had a Priest as early as 1086.

In 1648, a Parish Return recorded that the Parish possessed "a messuage and six acres in the occupation of George Dayntieth; two acres at Ellerdine in the occupation of Thomas Whytngham and three acres at Rowton in the occupation of William Arneway – the whole valued at 15s". However seven years later at the Parliamentary survey of 1655 records "Rowton Chapel hath no means belonging to it" The church lands were most likely seized during the Reformation and ever since has existed as a 'perpetual curacy' served from High Ercall.

By way of war memorials, the church contains a framed pictorial Roll of Honour to men of "the parish of Ercall Magna" (ie High Ercall) who served and died in World War I (identical to the one in High Ercall church itself), and on the north wall a wooden plaque the three men from Rowton who died serving in World War II.

The ashes of John Beard (1871-1950), former leader of the Workers' Union, were scattered on the graves of his relatives in Rowton churchyard.

Today Rowton church functions under the Diocese of Lichfield and serves the village and surrounding hamlets including Ellerdine.

=== The Bourne Family ===
A charitable trust exists within the chapelry of Rowton entitled 'The John and Eliza Bourne Trust'. It was established in 1929, through a bequest of the late church warden and local philanthropist John Bourne, who left a quantity of shares in Barclays Bank, the dividends of which were to be paid to the poor widows and widowers of Rowton, Ellerdine, Cold Hatton and Sytch Lane in the parish of Ercall Magna, Shropshire, England.

The family are also responsible for the fine oak pulpit in Rowton Church which is engraved with the text "erected by Sydney J. Bourne in memory of his parents John & Eliza Bourne and his brother Robert and John Bourne"

== The Railway ==
Rowton Halt was a stop on The Wellington and Market Drayton Railway, which was opened in 1867 and operated by the Great Western Railway Company. However, lack of use forced the line to close to passenger traffic on 9 September 1963, and to freight four years later.

== Richard Baxter ==
Richard Baxter the English Puritan church leader, theologian and controversialist, called by Dean Stanley "the chief of English Protestant Schoolmen" was born at Rowton on 12 November 1615 and is commemorated there by a small stone obelisk, which stands on a triangle of grass at the centre of the village. He was also an energetic campaigner for the establishment of a University in Shrewsbury but insufficient funding prevented success.

Baxter spent the first ten years of his life living in the village with his maternal grandparents and received six years of education there; however Baxter later said that these first years of education were substandard as all four of his tutors were ignorant, two were immoral and one was a drunkard.

== Listed buildings ==
The village contains eight Grade II listed buildings; Baxter House (a 19th century house on the site of which was said to be Richard Baxter's childhood home), Baxter Monument, Bleak House, Church Farmhouse, All Hallows Church, High House Farmhouse, Rock Farmhouse and The Firs.

== Genetic testing ==
Rowton came into the public eye in 2000 when it was revealed that the Ministry of Agriculture was using a farm in the village for trials of Genetically Modified crops.

== See also ==
- Listed buildings in Ercall Magna
- Listed buildings in Alberbury with Cardeston
