= Rowton Halt railway station =

Disused railway station in Shropshire, England

Rowton Halt

General information
- Location: Rowton, Shropshire; England
- Coordinates: 52.7745°N 2.5544°W
- Grid reference: SJ627199
- Platforms: 2

Other information
- Status: Disused

History
- Post-grouping: Great Western Railway

Key dates
- 29 June 1935: Opened
- 1963: Closed
Location

Rowton Halt railway station was a station in Rowton, Shropshire, England. The station was opened in 1935 and closed in 1963. The halt was located to the south of a road over bridge and there were steps down to the platforms. The site of the halt has now been infilled.

Preceding station	Disused railways	Following station
Ellerdine Halt; Line and station closed	Great Western Railway; Wellington and Drayton Railway	Crudgington; Line and station closed
