= Siege of High Ercall Hall =

Siege that occurred during the First English Civil War

Coordinates: 52°45′10″N 2°36′10″W

- Part of The First English Civil War
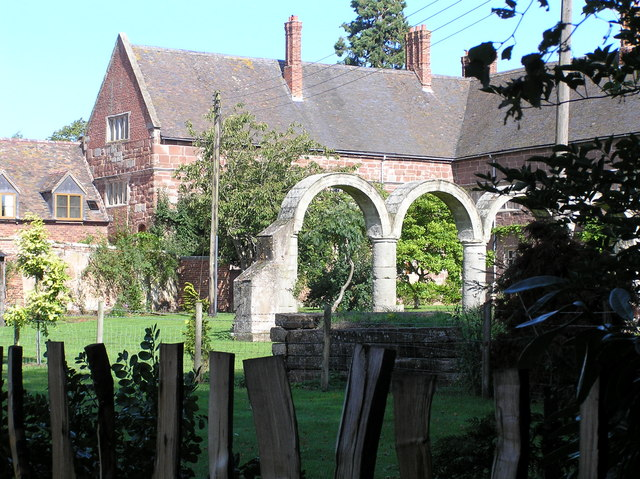
- Ercall Hall
Date	First Siege; February 1645; Second Siege; March 1645; Third Siege; July 1645 – 28 March 1646
Location	High Ercall, Shropshire
Result	Parliamentarian victory

Belligerents
Royalists	(Kingdom of England) Parliamentarians

Commanders and leaders
Lord Newport; Sir Vincent Corbet	

Strength
200	
- Shropshire

The siege of High Ercall Hall in High Ercall, Shropshire, England took place during the First English Civil War. There were a total of three sieges. In each of the sieges, the Hall was held by the Royalists and besieged by the Parliamentarians. The final and longest siege took place from July 1645 to March 1646, when the Royalist commander surrendered the hall to the Parliamentarians.

== History of the building ==
High Ercall Hall, in the village of High Ercall, was a fortified 13th-century manor built by the Arkle family. In the seventeenth century the estate was owned by the Newport family and a new mansion had been built in 1608 for Sir Francis Newport alongside the older house.

== Siege ==
The Newports were prominent royalists and during the civil war, Richard, Lord Newport garrisoned the Hall for the King with 200 troops. A large earthen bank was raised over the north and north-west curtain walls to provide a defence against cannon and musket fire.

Between 1645 and 1646 the house was besieged three times by Parliamentary forces. The first siege caused damage to the nearby church and resulted in the loss of the drawbridge, but ended with a Parliamentarian withdrawal.

The second siege ended when the now reinforced garrison again beat off the Parliamentarian attack.

The third siege however, which started in July 1645, proved to be decisive. The Parliamentary forces were now in a position to effect an artillery bombardment of the buildings and, despite Lord Newport arriving with more reinforcements, the Royalist commander, Sir Vincent Corbet, surrendered on 28 March 1646. Under the terms of surrender the 212 surviving members of the garrison, were allowed to leave for the Royalist city of Worcester. Forty members of the cavalry were allowed to keep their arms, but the rest of the garrison had to leave their arms behind along with all the other materiel "of which there was a great plenty".

The new building erected in 1608 was severely damaged in the shelling. Only a fragment of the loggia remains as a short row of arches in the garden of the older house. With the loss of High Ercall, Ludlow was the only garrison in Shropshire left in the control of the Royalists, and it fell in May of that year.

== See also ==
- Shropshire in the English Civil War
