= Shropshire in the English Civil War =

This is a timeline for the English Civil War in Shropshire.

== Context ==
Politically, the English county of Shropshire was predominantly Royalist at the start of the civil war. Of the county's twelve Members at the Long Parliament called in 1640, eight would fight on the Royalist side and four for Parliament. Control of the area was important to the King as Shropshire was a gateway to predominantly Royalist Wales as well as to keep in contact with the north-western counties and the western port links with Ireland. Parliamentary control of Shropshire was achieved after the capture of its last Royalist garrison by Parliament in 1646.

== First English Civil War ==
=== 1642 ===
The week after raising his standard at Nottingham, Charles I proceeded into Shropshire, arriving via Newport in Wellington on 19 September.

On 20 September he issued the Wellington Declaration promising to preserve the Protestant religion, laws, and liberties of his subjects, and the privileges of Parliament, and inspected his troops below the Wrekin. From Wellington he marched to Shrewsbury, where he was joined by his two sons, the Prince of Wales and James, Duke of York, his nephew Prince Rupert, and great numbers of noblemen and gentlemen, and established a mint in the town. He remained there until 12 October, when he marched to Bridgnorth, and from there advanced to Edge Hill, in Warwickshire, where the first pitched battle of the First Civil War was fought.

=== 1643 ===
In January the king formally appointed Sir Francis Ottley as governor of Shrewsbury.

In counteraction to the king, the Parliamentarians, including some Shropshire gentry, formed their Committee of Association for Warwickshire, Staffordshire and Shropshire in April 1643.

In August Wem declared for Parliament; shortly afterwards the Royalists sent substantial forces, under the command of Lord Capel, to the area. It is understood that the forces were substantially unmatched: a parliamentary garrison of around 40 faced a Royalist force of 5000 coming Shrewsbury and from Chester. The fact that Wem was not actually taken, the curious route of forming up to the east, and the engagement lasting only one afternoon, along with the presence of the library of Geneva Bible publisher Sir Rowland Hill near by has given rise to a theory that the Battle of Wem was concerned with the evacuation of the library of Soulton Hall, which yielded texts into what is now known as the Cotton Library.

On 28 December 1643 Tong Castle was captured by Parliamentarian troops from Eccleshall, Staffordshire.

=== 1644 ===
On 13 March 1644 Hopton Castle was captured by the Royalists. The Parliamentary commander, Colonel More, did not surrender until after the final assault. The Royalist commander Sir Michael Woodhouse, at his digression (his prerogative under the laws of war as they were practised at that time), decided not to grant the majority of his prisoners quarter and they were killed by their captors. However the Parliamentary side believed for some months that prior to the surrender terms had been agreed which included the sparing of the lives of the garrison and so the killings were a breach of the law of war. It was not until October that year the Colonel More's account was published, setting the record straight, but not in time to prevent Parliamentary propaganda vilifying the Royalists for their alleged Perfidy.

On 25 March began the Battle of Longford, when Colonel Thomas Mytton, commanding 500 Parliamentarians, headed for the Royalist strongholds of Lilleshall Abbey and Lea Castle, paused at Longford near Newport which was garrisoned by Parliamentarians to rest his men. There, however, Sir William Vaughan and Colonel Robert Ellice led local Royalist forces to find Mytton and rout him. Having driven off Mytton, the Royalists then besieged the small garrison which took shelter in Longford Hall. The Hall held out for a week before surrendering to the Royalists 2 April 1644.

On 6 April Tong Castle was captured by the Royalists under the command of Prince Rupert.

In June the king was in Shrewsbury during the campaign that led to the Battle of Cropredy Bridge. The same month Oswestry was taken from the Royalists by the Earl of Denbigh. The inhabitants gave £500 to prevent the Parliamentary soldiers from plundering.

In July Oswestry was besieged by the Royalists under Colonel Marrowe, but it was relieved by Sir Thomas Myddelton, who took Lord Newport's eldest son, Francis, and 200 men prisoners.

By August, Prince Rupert had Sir Francis Ottley replaced as royal governor of Shrewsbury by Sir Fulke Hunckes, who, becoming locally unpopular, was later that year replaced by Sir Michael Earnley.

In early October, Sir William Vaughan, the Royalist governor of Shrawardine Castle, was captured by Major-General Thomas Mytton while receiving the sacrament in Shrawardine church. He was allowed back into the castle on pretext of negotiating the garrison's surrender, but tricked Mytton by raising the drawbridge and broke his parole. By the winter Vaughan was appointed general of Shropshire, and quartered his regiment around the county, leaving his parson brother James in charge of Shrawardine.

=== 1645 ===
In February Apley House was taken by the Parliamentarians under Sir John Price, when Sir William and Sir Thomas Whitmore, Sir Francis Ottley, and about 60 men, were made prisoners.

On 23 February Parliament captured Shrewsbury town by surprise and the Castle surrendered the following day. The Governor, Sir Michael Earnley, was wounded in the attack; he was suffering from terminal consumption and died in April of either that or his wounds, or a combination of both. At the surrender Thomas Mytton, the Parliamentarian Governor of Wem and in command of the Parliamentary Forces, took 15 pieces of ordnance, about 60 gentlemen, and 200 soldiers. In the same month they also captured Benthall Hall from the Royalists.

On 10 June there was a battle at Stokesay, near Ludlow. The Royalists were defeated, and Sir William Croft was slain by the Parliamentarians. Stokesay Castle was captured, and Caus Castle and Shrawardine also fell to Parliament the same month.

On 4 and 5 July, Sir William Vaughan won two significant victories, resulting in the relief of the besieged garrison of High Ercall.

In the late autumn, Oliver Cromwell appeared before Longford. The village was quickly taken and the General immediately placed Longford Hall under siege. Upon Cromwell's call for the garrison to surrender, Sir Bartholomew Pell, the Royalist commander, entered into negotiations with Cromwell, winning favourable terms. Under the terms of surrender, the garrison surrendered their arms “without imbezeling”. Pell and his 14 officers were allowed to retain their horses, swords and pistols and the garrison was escorted toward Oxford.

=== 1646 ===
On 28 March the Royalist garrison of High Ercall, under Sir Vincent Corbet, capitulated. The articles of surrender allowed the garrison to depart for Worcester, albeit without their weapons.

In April, after a one-month siege the Royalist garrison of Bridgnorth Castle surrendered to the Parliamentarians.

On 9 July the Royalist garrison of Ludlow surrendered to Sir William Brereton.

=== 1647 ===
Fear of Royalist uprisings lead to Parliament ordering Shrewsbury re-garrisoned.

== Third English Civil War ==
=== 1651 ===
At 3 o'clock in the morning of 4 September Charles II and the Earl of Derby arrived at White Ladies Priory, fleeing from defeat at the battle of Worcester. Charles had his hair cut off, and was disguised in the clothes of the resident Pendrills. Hence he was conducted to Boscobel House, where he was concealed during the night, and in the day time he hid himself with Colonel Careless in the Royal Oak. Overnight 5-6 September he and one of the Pendrills took a night ride to Madeley Court where he was hid at a barn but advised by the court's owner Francis Woolfe not to cross the River Severn for Wales. From Boscobel he was conducted by the five faithful brothers, the Pendrills, to Mr. Whitgrave's house, at Moseley, in Staffordshire on 8 September.

== Interregnum ==
=== 1651 ===
On 15 October 1651 Captain John Benbow, uncle to the renowned admiral, was shot on the Shrewsbury Castle's green following capture at Battle of Worcester.

=== 1654 ===
Sir Thomas Harries, in an abortive royalist uprising, fails to capture Shrewsbury Castle in a surprise attack.
