= Cotwall =

Cotwall may refer to:

- Cotwall, Shropshire, a hamlet in the parish of Ercall Magna, in Shropshire, England
- Cotwall End, an area of Sedgley, in the West Midlands, England
