= High Ercall Hall =

House in Shropshire, England

Coordinates: 52.752234°N 2.602071°W

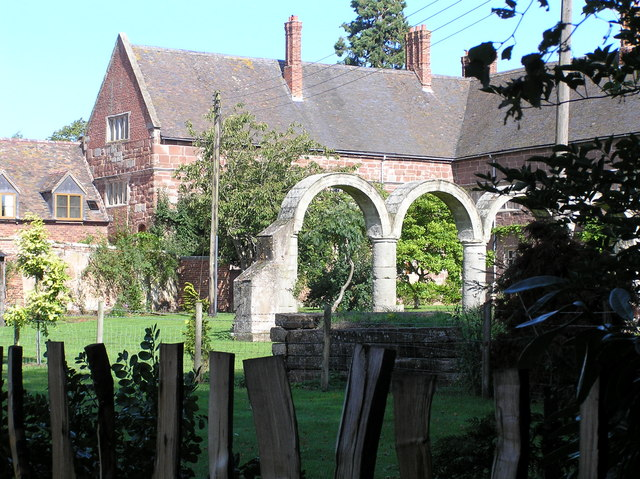
High Ercall Hall, showing arches from newer demolished 1608 building

High Ercall Hall or Ercall Hall is the remaining part of a larger complex in the village of High Ercall, Shropshire, 8 miles (13 km) north-east of Shrewsbury.

The present structure is a Grade II* L-shaped, three-storey building of 16th-century origin, constructed of sandstone and brick. It has 5 bays with 3 alternate projecting gables. Adjacent to the house is a row of arches, the only remainder of a larger 17th-century house building that was badly damaged during the English Civil War.

== History ==
Hamo Peveril bought High Ercall in 1098 and it remained in the Peveril family until 1271. It then passed to the Ercall (or Arkle) family, who held it until 1391. The earliest recorded building on the site was a 12th-century Manor House built by the Ercall family. This was protected by John de Ercall in the 13th century by the construction of curtain walling and defensive towers.

The manor then passed to Thomas Newport in 1391 and the present house was constructed by the Newport family in the 16th century. It passed to Francis Newport who, between 1601 and 1620, had a larger mansion house built alongside. Newport employed a stonemason called Walter Hancock in his building projects, and on 11 November 1595 he wrote from High Ercall to the town council of Shrewsbury, recommending Hancock be employed to build a new market hall.

At the time of the Civil War, his son Richard Newport, 1st Baron Newport, an ardent Royalist, fortified the buildings to act as a Royalist stronghold and garrison. Large earthen ramparts were thrown up against the curtain walling to protect the buildings from artillery fire. The hall was besieged several times during the war (see Siege of High Ercall Hall) and finally fell to the Parliamentary forces in 1646. The new mansion was by then badly damaged and any fortifications were subsequently demolished by the Parliamentary forces. The original buildings, however, were still habitable and continued in use as a farmhouse.

It was home in the 19th century of Edward Steedman, father of the tennis playing sisters Bertha and Mary. In 1906 it was occupied by James H James-Moore. It is still in private hands.

== Time Team ==
The history and archaeology of the hall was covered by the 2002 Time Team episode Siege House in Shropshire (series 9, episode 8).

== See also ==
- Listed buildings in Ercall Magna
