= Crudgington railway station =

Disused railway station in Shropshire, England

Crudgington
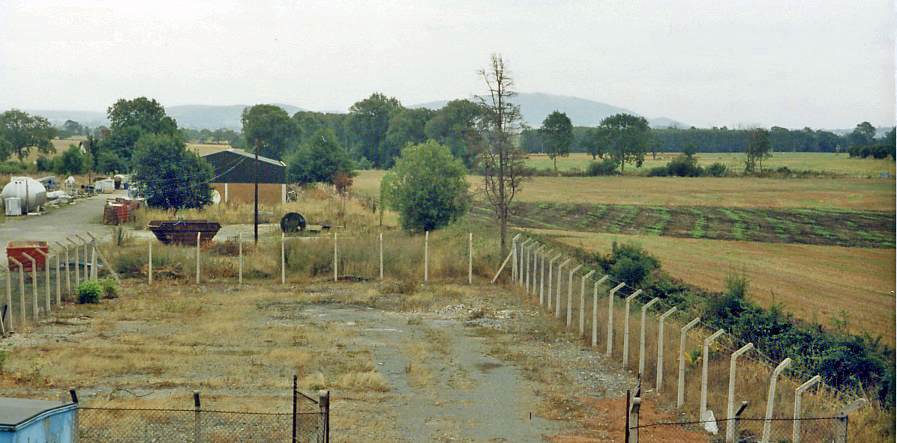
- The site of the station in 1983

General information
- Location: Crudgington, Shropshire; England
- Coordinates: 52.7578°N 2.5521°W
- Grid reference: SJ629179
- Platforms: 2

Other information
- Status: Disused

History
- Original company: Wellington and Drayton Railway
- Pre-grouping: Great Western Railway
- Post-grouping: Great Western Railway

Key dates
- 16 October 1867: Opened
- 9 September 1963: Closed
Location

Crudgington railway station was a station in Crudgington, Shropshire, England. The station was opened in 1867 and closed in 1963.

Preceding station	Disused railways	Following station
Rowton Halt; Line and station closed	Great Western Railway; Wellington and Drayton Railway	Longdon Halt; Line and station closed
