= Roden, Shropshire =

Coordinates: 52.745°N 2.631°W

Roden
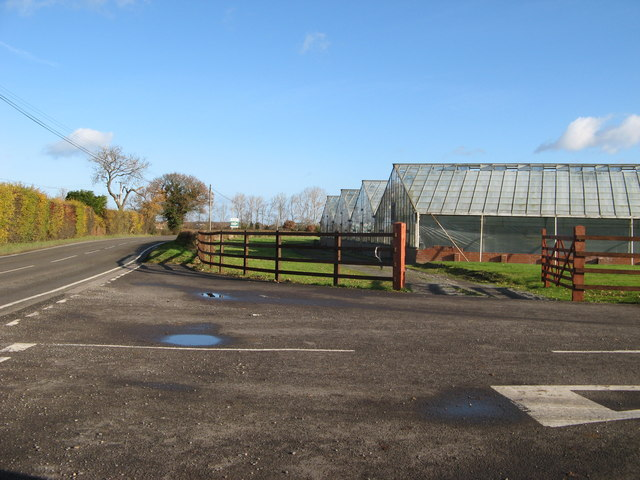
- Glasshouses at Roden

- Location within Shropshire
- OS grid reference: SJ573166
- Civil parish: Ercall Magna
- Unitary authority: Telford and Wrekin
- Ceremonial county: Shropshire
- Region: West Midlands
- Country: England
- Sovereign state: United Kingdom
- Post town: TELFORD
- Postcode district: TF6
- Dialling code: 01952
- Police: West Mercia
- Fire: Shropshire
- Ambulance: West Midlands
- UK Parliament: The Wrekin

Roden is a hamlet in the borough of Telford and Wrekin and ceremonial county of Shropshire, England, six miles northeast of Shrewsbury. The little River Roden flows past the village. The population at the 2011 census can be found under High Ercall.

Roden Hall, dating in part from the 14th century, when the Lee family, lords of Berrington, were lords of the vill of Roden, was rebuilt in 1868 by the Co-operative Wholesale Society as a convalescent home for millworkers from Lancashire and Yorkshire. It is now a care home, in which English baritone Derek Hammond-Stroud passed his last days. White House, a Grade II listed 16th or 17th century vernacular timber framed house with whitened brick infill panel was formerly used as a post office. Foundations remain of a detached medieval chapel.

The hamlet is located on Roden Lane, the B5062 road, one mile southwest of High Ercall; a former toll house stands by the roadside. Local transport links are provided by Arriva in the form of bus route 822 to Wellington.

There is a large garden centre at Roden, and the huge greenhouses can be clearly seen from the main road through the village. The surrounding countryside is largely flat pastureland. Possible remains of medieval ridge and furrow field pattern near the river have been detected from the air (1991).

Roden had a long history of producing tomatoes, and was once covered in greenhouses owned by the Farmcare subsidiary of the Co-operative Wholesale Society; the society had purchased land there in 1896 for its first farm. By the 1950s some 90% of the Society's site was devoted to growing tomatoes. Most of the greenhouses have now been removed.

== See also ==
- Listed buildings in Ercall Magna
