= Robert Vernon (MP for Shropshire) =

English landowner, courtier and politician

Sir Robert Vernon KB (1577–1625) was an English landowner, courtier and politician who sat in the House of Commons from 1621 to 1622.

Vernon was the son of John Vernon of Hodnet, Shropshire and his wife Elizabeth Devereux, daughter of Sir Richard Devereux. He was the brother of Elizabeth Vernon, Countess of Southampton, and of Susan Vernon, second wife of Sir Walter Leveson, and a first cousin of Robert Devereux, 2nd Earl of Essex. After his father’s death in 1591, he was made a ward of Robert Devereux, 2nd Earl of Essex, and was knighted by him in Ireland in 1599. He joined Essex’ abortive rebellion in February 1601, but suffered no more than a few weeks’ imprisonment in the Gatehouse and a fine of £100.

He was appointed comptroller of the household to Queen Elizabeth and was made Knight of the Bath by her.

In 1621, he was elected Member of Parliament for Shropshire.

Vernon died at the age of about 48. He had married Mary Needham, daughter of Sir Robert Needham of Shavington. Their son Henry was created a baronet.

Parliament of England
Preceded by Sir Roger Owen; Sir Richard Newport	Member of Parliament for Shropshire; 1621–1622; With: Sir Francis Kynaston	Succeeded by Sir Richard Newport; Sir Andrew Corbet
