= Listed buildings in Ercall Magna =

Ercall Magna is a civil parish in the district of Telford and Wrekin, Shropshire, England. It contains 28 listed buildings that are recorded in the National Heritage List for England. Of these, one is listed at Grade I, the highest of the three grades, two are at Grade II*, the middle grade, and the others are at Grade II, the lowest grade. The parish contains the village of High Ercall, and smaller settlements including Roden and Rowton, and is almost entirely rural. Most of the listed buildings are houses, farmhouses and farm buildings. The other listed buildings include two churches, a churchyard wall, a former manor house, the remaining parts of a former Jacobean mansion, a former watermill and mill house, a mounting block, and a monument.

== Key ==
Grade	Criteria
I	Buildings of exceptional interest, sometimes considered to be internationally important
II*	Particularly important buildings of more than special interest
II	Buildings of national importance and special interest

== Buildings ==
Name and location	Photograph	Date	Notes	Grade
St Michael's Church, High Ercall; 52.75218°N 2.60202°W		12th century	The oldest parts of the church are the nave and the aisles, and the chancel dates from the 14th century. The church was damaged during the Civil War, and was repaired and reconstructed between 1657 and 1662. It was restored in 1864 by G. E. Street who added the porch and the vestry. It is built in sandstone with a tiled roof. The church consists of a nave, north and south aisles, a south porch, a chancel with a north chapel and a south vestry, and a west tower. The tower has angle buttresses, a stair turret, clock faces, a frieze, a cornice with gargoyles, and an embattled parapet. In the churchyard are the remains of an early medieval cross.	I
Stable, Poynton Manor; 52.75623°N 2.63802°W		15th century	The gabled west wall of the stable was originally part of a chapel, and contains a Perpendicular window. There is sandstone in the north wall, the rest of the building is timber framed with red brick infill and a tiled roof.	II
Poynton Manor House; 52.75672°N 2.63840°W	—	c. 1600	The manor house was extended in the 19th century. The earlier part is timber framed with rendering on the east front, and the roof is tiled. There are two storeys and attics, and the windows are casements. To the south are two gables with jettied upper floors and attics with moulded bressumers on brackets. The extension is to the north and is in brick.	II
Store northeast of Tern Farmhouse; 52.74764°N 2.56212°W	—	16th to 17th century	Originally a cottage, the building is timber framed with red brick infill and a tile roof. There are two storeys, and it contains later casement windows and a door.	II
Whitehouse Farmhouse; 52.76246°N 2.61040°W	—	16th to 17th century	A timber framed farmhouse with brick infill, bracketed eaves, and a hipped roof with wood shingles. There are three bays, and two storeys, the upper floor jettied on a moulded bressumer with brackets. The door and small casement windows are modern.	II
White House; 52.74553°N 2.62977°W	—	Late 16th or early 17th century	The house was extended in the 19th century. The original part is timber framed with brick infill, and consists of a three-bay main range, and a west cross-wing with a jettied gable. The extension is an east cross-wing in brick. The house has two storeys, a doorway with pilasters, casement windows, and tile roofs.	II
Ercall Hall; 52.75285°N 2.60279°W		1608	The remaining part of a Jacobean mansion on a moated site, it is built partly in sandstone and partly in red brick with blue brick diapering, and has a tile roof. There are three storeys, and two ranges at right angles. The windows are mullioned with cornices.	II*
Arcade southeast of Ercall Hall; 52.75245°N 2.60277°W		c. 1608	The arcade is in the garden of the hall. It is in stone, and is all that remains of an open loggia. The arcade consists of four moulded arches and five circular piers.	II*
9 Rowton; 52.77511°N 2.57471°W	—	17th century	A timber framed cottage with rendered infill and a tile roof. There is one storey and an attic and two bays. The windows are small casements, and there is a gabled dormer.	II
Wall northeast of Ercall Hall; 52.75304°N 2.60255°W	—	17th century	The wall extends along the north side of the garden. It is in brick on sandstone foundations, and part of it is a retaining wall to earthworks. The wall contains three pointed archways.	II
White Lodge; 52.75924°N 2.62415°W	—	17th century	The house was extended in the 19th century. The original part is timber framed and faced in red brick, with roughcast gable ends and a tile roof. There are two storeys and an attic, three bays, and the windows are casements. The extension to the south is in brick and has two storeys and two bays.	II
Wall, gate and gate piers, Almshouses; 52.75395°N 2.60115°W	—	Late 17th century	The wall encloses the garden at the front of the almshouses. It is in red brick, and in the centre is a gateway with wrought iron gates, and a pair of gate piers in brick with gabled buttresses and stone pyramidal caps.	II
The Almshouses; 52.75411°N 2.60108°W	—	1694	The almshouses are in red brick with tile roofs. They have one storey and attics, and a U-shaped plan, with a central four-bay range, and projecting gabled wings with parapets. The windows are mullioned and transomed, and contain casements, and there are five gabled dormers. Above the central doorway is a large inscribed datestone.	II
Churchyard boundary wall 52.75229°N 2.60109°W	—	18th century	The wall surrounds the churchyard of St Michael's Church on all four sides. It is in sandstone, and on the west and south sides has a plinth and coping.	II
Farm buildings southwest of Ercall Hall; 52.75264°N 2.60331°W	—	18th century	The farm building is in red brick with a dentil eaves course and a tile roof. It contains stone mullion windows and ventilation holes. At the southwest end is a 17th-century timber framed barn with brick infill, mostly faced in brick.	II
Vicarage Cottage; 52.75133°N 2.60597°W	—	18th century	A red brick cottage with dentil eaves, and a tile roof with a gabled parapet at the south end. There is one storey and an attic, two bays, and a lean-to on the south end. The windows are casements with lozenge glazing, chamfered surrounds, and hood moulds. There is a gabled dormer, and to the south is a gabled porch with a hipped roof.	II
Ercall Mill and Mill House; 52.74309°N 2.61594°W		Late 18th century	The former water mill and adjoining house are in brick with dentil eaves, and roofs of slate and tile. The mill has three storeys, and contains a segmental-headed window in each floor, a door in the ground and middle floors, and a gabled wheelhouse to the southwest. The house is at right angles, and has three storeys, one bay, casement windows, and a porch in the angle. To the northeast is a 19th-century two-storey, one-bay extension.	II
Rock Farmhouse; 52.77489°N 2.57542°W	—	Late 18th century	A red brick farmhouse with a dentil eaves course and a tile roof, two storeys and two bays. The windows are sashes with segmental heads, and there is a lower brick outbuilding to the left.	II
The Firs; 52.77590°N 2.57584°W	—	c. 1800	A red brick house with a dentil eaves course, and a tile roof with stone coped gables. There are two storeys and an attic and three bays. The central doorway has a reeded architrave, a panelled frieze, a cornice, and a rectangular fanlight. The windows are replacement casements, those in the lower floors with segmental heads.	II
High House Farmhouse; 52.77531°N 2.57415°W	—	Late 18th to early 19th century	A red brick farmhouse with a dentil eaves course and a tile roof. There are two storeys and three bays. In the centre is a gabled porch, and the windows are replacement casements.	II
The Old Vicarage; 52.75321°N 2.60464°W	—	Early 19th century	A brick house with string courses and a tile roof. There are two storeys and attic, two bays, the right bay gabled, and a rear wing. The windows are sashes, those in the ground floor with three lights.	II
Baxter House; 52.77447°N 2.57554°W	—	Early 19th century	A red brick house with a dentil eaves course and a tile roof. There are two storeys and an attic, and three bays. The central doorway is round-headed with a semicircular fanlight, and a cornice on consoles, and the windows are replacement casements.	II
Bleak House; 52.77566°N 2.57615°W	—	Early 19th century	A red brick house with dentil eaves and a tiled roof with stone coped gables. There are two storeys, two bays, and an earlier rear wing. The windows are sashes with plain lintels.	II
Church Farmhouse; 52.77455°N 2.57287°W	—	Early 19th century	A red brick farmhouse with a dentil eaves course and a tile roof. There are two storeys and three bays. In the centre is a gabled porch, and the windows are replacement casements with segmental heads, the window above the porch being blind.	II
New House; 52.79706°N 2.56443°W	—	Early 19th century	A red brick house with a hipped slate roof. There are two storeys, three bays, and a recessed bay on the left. The doorway has a rectangular fanlight with a hood on console brackets, and there is a porch in the angle. The windows are sashes with segmental heads.	II
Mounting block, White House; 52.74510°N 2.62850°W	—	19th century (probable)	The mounting block stand by the side of the road. It is cut from a single piece of sandstone.	II
Baxter Monument; 52.77536°N 2.57469°W		Late 19th century (probable)	The monument commemorates Richard Baxter, a 17th-century church leader. It is in stone and consists of a squat obelisk on a plinth with an inscribed bronze shield.	II
All Hallows Church, Rowton; 52.77523°N 2.57115°W		1881	The church is an enlargement of a medieval church, and consists of a broad nave and gabled west porch, and a short chancel. The nave is mainly in sandstone, and its east wall and the chancel are in brick. The roof is tiled, and at the west end is a small corbelled-out bellcote with a spire.	II
