= John Beard (trade unionist) =

British trade unionist and politician

John Beard CBE
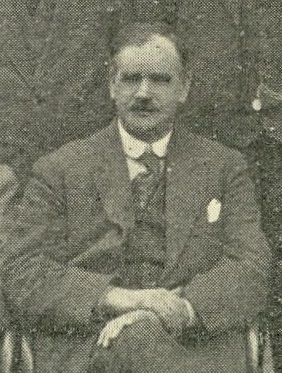
- Beard in 1922
- Born: John Cecil Beard; 9 December 1871; Ellerdine, Shropshire, England
- Died: 25 September 1950 (aged 78); Ellerdine, Shropshire, England
- Occupations: Trade unionist, politician

John Cecil Beard CBE (9 December 1871 – 25 September 1950) was a British trade unionist and politician.

== Life ==
Beard was born in Ellerdine Heath in Shropshire in 1871, son of a farm labourer. His family were Primitive Methodists, whose local chapel ran an elementary day school at Ellerdine where Beard had his full-time education until leaving at the age of ten years.

After leaving school he helped his father when then working in a brickyard carrying bricks for the building of an extension to Peplow Hall, then as labourer on a farm at Muckleton, Shawbury and at age fourteen for a builder at nearby Wytheford who was then working on the Apley Castle estate at Wellington. He briefly left Shropshire when he worked down a mine in north Staffordshire where he joined the Miners' Association union before he took up work as an insurance agent, becoming a founder of the Planet Insurance Company.

He was a founder member of the Workers' Union in 1898, and it appointed him as its Shropshire organiser. In this role, after a failed attempt to organise in the Ironbridge coalfields he recruited large numbers of farm labourers to the union, and successfully campaigned for an increase in their wages. By 1900, the union in Shropshire grew to 20 branches, although most had an ephemeral existence. He moved to Birmingham in 1904 to become the union's national agricultural organiser, and there became involved in the Labour Party.

Beard, who had been one of ten self-described Labour members elected at the founding of High Ercall Parish Council in Shropshire in 1894, was elected as a member of Birmingham City Council in 1910, representing Saltley, in which post he was leading figure in the creation of the Birmingham Municipal Bank. He left Birmingham in 1920 when he became more involved in union affairs in London

In 1913, Beard was elected as national president of the Workers' Union. He led a major, successful, strike in the chain-making industry that year, further increasing his prestige in the union, and was elected to the general council of the Trades Union Congress (TUC) in 1920. However, by 1927, the Workers' Union's finances were a major problem, and Beard led negotiations with Ernest Bevin which led to it merging into the Transport and General Workers' Union (TGWU) two years later. In 1929/30, Beard served as President of the TUC, and in 1931 as the TUC's joint representative to the American Federation of Labour. He retired in 1936, and was appointed Commander of the Order of the British Empire (CBE) in the 1938 Birthday Honours. In 1915, Beard founded initially for the W.U.'s Midlands region a monthly magazine called The Record, which went national in 1916 and was later adopted by the TGWU.

In retirement, Beard served on the Wheat Commission and the Agricultural Wages Board until his death. He settled in Kingsbury, London but revisited Shropshire. He published in 1949 a book of reminiscences of his early life in the county, My Shropshire Days on Common Ways.

Beard died in his sleep while staying at the home of a boyhood friend at Rose Cottage in Ellerdine, aged 78. His funeral service took place on 29 September 1950 at Bethel (ex-PM) Chapel at Ellerdine Heath, followed by cremation at Perry Barr, Birmingham, after which his ashes were scattered on the graves of relatives at All Hallows churchyard, Rowton.

== Family ==
Beard married Dora Cadman, of Old Park, Dawley, Shropshire, who was sister of Congregationalist minister and religious broadcaster Samuel Parkes Cadman. The couple had one son and five daughters.

Trade union offices
Preceded by Robert Morley	President of the Workers' Union; 1913–1929	Succeeded by Position abolished
Preceded by Ben Tillett	President of the Trades Union Congress; 1929–1930	Succeeded by Arthur Hayday
Preceded by Allan Findlay and Arthur Shaw	Trades Union Congress representative to the American Federation of Labour; 1931; With: Frank Wolstencroft	Succeeded by Charles Dukes and Bill Holmes
