= Francis Kynaston =

English lawyer, courtier, poet and politician

Sir Francis Kynaston or Kinaston (1587–1642) was an English lawyer, courtier, poet and politician who sat in the House of Commons from 1621 to 1622. He is noted for his translation of Geoffrey Chaucer's Troilus and Criseyde into Latin verse (as rime royal, Amorum Troili et Creseidae Libri Quinque, 1639). He also made a Latin translation of Henryson's The Testament of Cresseid.

== Life ==
Kynaston was born at Oteley Park, near Ellesmere, Shropshire, the eldest son of Sir Edward Kynaston and his wife Isobel Bagenal, daughter of Sir Nicholas Bagenal. His father was High Sheriff of Shropshire in 1599. On 11 December 1601 Kynaston matriculated at Oriel College, Oxford. He graduated B.A. from St Mary Hall on 14 June 1604 and M.A. at Oxford on 11 November 1611. He was called to the bar at Lincoln's Inn in 1611. He was knighted by James I at Theobalds on 21 December 1618.

In 1621 Kynaston was elected Member of Parliament for Shropshire. Believed to have been cupbearer to James I, he became esquire of the body by 1624 and continued to hold the post under Charles I until 1642.

At court Kynaston was the centre of a literary coterie. In 1635 he founded an academy of learning, called the Musæum Minervæ, for which he obtained a licence under the great seal, a grant of arms, and a common seal; Charles also contributed from the treasury. On 27 February 1636 Prince Charles, the Duke of York, and others visited the museum, and a masque by Kynaston, entitled Corona Minervæ, was performed in their presence. In July of the same year Sir George Peckham bequeathed money to the institution. At this time, Kynaston was living at Covent Garden in London. The Musaeum, which was beset by plagues in 1635 and 1637, financial difficulties and opposition from the universities and Inns of Court, closed by 1639. Its site was marked by Kynaston's Alley, Bedfordbury.

Shortly after this, Kynaston was preoccupied with promoting a certain ‘hanging furnace,’ recommended by him to the lords of the admiralty for ships of war.

In 1642, at the beginning of the English Civil War, Kynaston was appointed a Commissioner of Array for Shropshire by the Royalist authorities but appears to have had no personal involvement or trouble. According to the Oxford Dictionary of National Biography he died, intestate during 1642 and was buried at Oteley (sic) but letters of administration for his estate were granted to his son Edward in 1649.

Kynaston married, firstly, Margaret Lee, daughter of Sir Humphry Lee, 1st Baronet of Langley, in 1613. They had one son, Edward (c. 1613 – 1656), and four daughters - Frances (b. 1612), Rachel, Ann (d. 1642) and Barbara (d. 1619). Margaret died in 1623, following which he married Margaret, sister of Charles Mainwaring. The couple had no children and she survived Kynaston, dying in 1661.

== Works ==
Kynaston published a translation of Chaucer's ‘Troilus and Cressida,’ with a commentary, prefaced by fifteen short poems by Oxford writers, including William Strode and Dudley Digges (Oxford, 1635) which credited him with having rescued Chaucer's work from the obscurity into which it had then fallen, making it understandable to readers in Kynaston's day. Kynaston also contributed to the Musæ Aulicæ by Arthur Johnston, a rendering in English verse of Johnston's Latin poems, London, 1635, and was author of an heroic romance in verse, Leoline and Sydanis, containing some of the legendary history of Wales and Anglesey, published with Cynthiades: Sonnets to his Mistresse (technically not precisely of the sonnet form) addressed by Kynaston to his mistress under the name of Cynthia (London, 1642).

== Notes ==
Parliament of England
| Preceded by Sir Roger Owen; Sir Richard Newport | Member of Parliament for Shropshire; 1621–1622; With: Sir Robert Vernon | Succeeded by Sir Richard Newport; Sir Andrew Corbet |
