= Longdon Halt railway station =

Disused railway station in Shropshire, England

Longdon Halt

General information
- Location: Longdon-on-Tern, Shropshire; England
- Coordinates: 52.7303°N 2.5497°W
- Grid reference: SJ630149
- Platforms: 2

Other information
- Status: Disused

History
- Post-grouping: Great Western Railway

Key dates
- 20 October 1934: Opened
- 1963: Closed
Location

Longdon Halt railway station was a station in Longdon-on-Tern, Shropshire, England. The station was opened in 1934 and closed in 1963. There were two short wooden edged platforms with wooden waiting shelters. Both platforms were accessible from steps down the shallow cutting leading from the road over bridge.

Preceding station	Disused railways	Following station
Crudgington; Line and station closed	Great Western Railway; Wellington and Drayton Railway	Wellington; Line closed, station open
