= RTITB National Junior Mechanic Competition 1987 =

National Junior Mechanics Competition (NJMC)
- Nations
- United Kingdom
- Those Eligible
- Apprentices and Full Time Students
- Qualifying Ages
- Under 18 Years Old
- Winning Team
- SoundWell Technical College

The 1987 National Junior Mechanics Competition (NJMC) (formerly the Apprentice Competition) event for the Road Transport Industry Training Board (RTITB) National Mechanics Competition was held on 24 June 1987 at MOTEC 1 (Multi Occupational Training and Educational Centre) located at High Ercall, a former RAF base.

The RTITB's Chairman, John Armstrong, revealed that 230 teams entered 1987's National Junior Mechanics Competition (NJMC). After regional heats, quarter-finals and semi-finals the final day consisted of a morning practical round contested by 10 teams, only 4 teams qualified for the final round.

The team from Soundwell Technical College, Bristol, England won the competition for the 4th time, having last been victorious in 1981. Carlisle College were placed 2nd, after leading in the practical round.

Highlights of the final were shown on Central Television news.

Austin Rover's UK Services Director, Roy Davies, presented the Winner's shield to Soundwell's Team Captain Mark Mannion.

== Semi Final (Practical Round) Results ==
RANK	PRACTICAL ROUND	POINTS
1.	(England) Carlisle College	318
2.	(England) Soundwell College	306
3.	(England) South Devon College	296
4.	(Scotland) Stevenson College	288
5.	(England) Burton Upon Trent College	284
6.	(England) Mid Kent College	263
7.	(England) Woolwich College	256
8.	(England) Trust Motors (Leeds)	226
9.	(England) Chesterfield College	226
10.	(England) Suffolk College	220

== Final results ==
RANK	FINAL	POINTS
Gold	(England) Soundwell College; Mark Mannion (Captain); David Gawler; Adrian Canham; John Smith; Ian Headford (Reserve); Mike Newby (Manager); John Winter (Assistant Manager)	42
Silver	(England) Carlisle College; Justin Ellis (Captain); Paul Moffat; Stephen Hill; Andrew Wilson; Andrew Hodgson (Reserve); Steve Doughty (Manager); Michael Clarke (Assistant Manager)	40
Bronze	(England) South Devon College; Mark Cutmore (Captain); Colin Samsom; Andrew Watters; Brian Trebilcock; Antony Dryland (Reserve); Colin Drew (Manager)	32
4.	(Scotland) Stevenson College; Alan Milne (Captain); Douglas Pugh; Bruce Unrau; Kevin Macaulay; William Blackley (Reserve); Alan Skene (Manager)	23

== Previous Winners ==
Year	Winners
1986	(England) Beverley College
1985	(England) Oxford College
1984	(England) Guildford College

== Future achievements of the 1987 Contestants ==
Mark ‘Cutty’ Cutmore, the Captain of third placed South Devon College pursued a career in the Royal Air Force, after his apprenticeship as a Mechanic. After graduating from the Royal Air Force’s Initial Officer Training, Cutty trained as a pilot and was selected to fly the Jaguar aircraft. Based in Scotland, Cutty trained as an Electronic Warfare Instructor, seeing active service over ex-Yugoslavia. He also represented the Royal Air Force as the Jaguar Display Pilot. Cutty joined the Red Arrows in 1999, flying as Reds 3, 5 and 9. After leaving the Red Arrows, Cutty was responsible for Jaguar Force training, later returning to the front line as a Flight Commander. After leaving the Royal Air Force Cutty joined The Blades display team as Blade 4, retiring after 10 display seasons in December 2017.

Justin Ellis, Captain of the runners-up Carlisle College, worked his way up through the ranks, starting as an apprentice right through to Service Manager at a Suzuki and Jeep Dealership in Carlisle. Whilst at Suzuki, Justin won the prestigious Suzuki Technician of the Year award in 2000. Justin also qualified as a Suzuki Master Technician and Jeep Master Diagnostic Technician. He later specialised in 4x4 vehicles, with particular interest in Chrysler, Suzuki, Jeep and Kia brands. In 2008 Justin founded City Garage, Tyne Street, Carlisle.

Ian Headford of Soundwell College left the automotive industry to follow a career in computing. Ian developed the popular Outlook Connector for MDaemon application for Interconnect Direct Limited an IT Software company.

Mark Mannion, Captain of the winners Soundwell College, left the automotive industry to pursue a career in IT. In 2007 Mark became Managing Director and co-founder of Extra Technology, an Automation Consultancy company, specialising in Workload Automation, Robotic Process Automation and AI. In 2022, Mark sold Extra Technology to BP3 Global in a deal funded by £1B private equity investor Horizon Capital.

Paul "Moff the Mullchanic" Moffat of Carlisle College is now a renowned Motorcycle Mechanic. Paul received factory training in Aprilia, Kawasaki, Ducati and was one of Yamaha’s Omega technicians. His forte is classic British and Japanese motorcycles.

Bruce Unrau of Stevenson College became a senior member of the Caledonian Brewery production team.

== Future of the RTITB ==
The Road Transport Industry Training Board was hit by scandal in 1997 and lost the right to issue TEC (A-level equivalent) certificates. The NJMC competition did not continue after 1997. .
