= Richard Newport, 1st Baron Newport =

English landowner and politician

- Born: 7 May 1587
- Died: 8 February 1651 (aged 63); Whornes Place, Cuxton, Kent
- Buried: Moulins, France
- Spouse: Rachel Leveson
- Father: Sir Francis Newport
- Mother: Beatrix Lacon

Richard Newport, 1st Baron Newport (7 May 1587 – 8 February 1651) was an English landowner and politician who sat in the House of Commons at various times between 1614 and 1629. He supported the Royalist cause in the English Civil War and was created Baron Newport in 1642.

== Biography ==
Newport was the son of Sir Francis Newport of High Ercall and Beatrix Lacon, daughter of Rowland Lacon. Newport was educated in Brasenose College, Oxford, from 1604 to 1607 and graduated with a Bachelor of Arts. In 1614 he was elected member of parliament for Shropshire. He was elected MP for Shrewsbury in 1621. In 1624 he was elected MP for Shropshire again and was re-elected in 1625, 1626 and 1628. He sat until 1629 when King Charles decided to rule without parliament for eleven years. He was appointed High Sheriff of Shropshire for 1626–27.

In 1642, Newport provided King Charles I of England with the sum of £6000 in exchange for a barony, enabling him to use artillery in the Battle of Edgehill and was duly elevated to the Peerage of England as Baron Newport, of High Ercall, in the County of Salop on 14 October, having been knighted at Theobalds House in Hertfordshire in 1615. He also fortified his country house, High Ercall Hall, and made it available as a Royalist stronghold and garrison. During the Siege of High Ercall Hall the house was severely damaged and eventually captured by Parliamentary forces in 1646. After the execution of the king in 1649, Newport fled to France.

== Family ==
Newport married, before 1615, Rachel Leveson (d. 31 January 1661), daughter of Sir John Leveson (21 March 1555 – 14 November 1615), and sister of Sir Richard Leveson (1598–1661), by whom he had three sons and four daughters. Newport died aged 63 in Moulins-en-Tonnerrois and was succeeded in the barony by his oldest son Francis. His second son Andrew was a courtier and member of parliament.

== Notes ==
Parliament of England
Preceded by Sir Roger Owen; Sir Robert Needham	Member of Parliament for Shropshire; 1614; With: Sir Roger Owen	Succeeded by Sir Robert Vernon; Sir Francis Kynaston
Preceded by Lewis Prowde; Francis Berkeley	Member of Parliament for Shrewsbury; 1621–1622; With: Francis Berkeley	Succeeded by Francis Berkeley; Thomas Owen
Preceded by Sir Robert Vernon; Sir Francis Kynaston	Member of Parliament for Shropshire; 1624–1629; With: Sir Andrew Corbet 1624–1625; Sir Richard Leveson 1626; Sir Andrew Corbet 1628–1629	Parliament suspended until 1640
Peerage of England
New creation	Baron Newport; 1642–1651	Succeeded by Francis Newport
