= High Ercall =

Village in Shropshire, England

Coordinates: 52.754°N 2.603°W

- Location within Shropshire
- Population: 1,639 (2011)
- OS grid reference: SJ593175
- Civil parish: Ercall Magna
- Unitary authority: Telford and Wrekin
- Ceremonial county: Shropshire
- Region: West Midlands
- Country: England
- Sovereign state: United Kingdom
- Post town: TELFORD
- Postcode district: TF6
- Dialling code: 01952
- Police: West Mercia
- Fire: Shropshire
- Ambulance: West Midlands
- UK Parliament: The Wrekin

High Ercall (/ɑːrkəl/ AR-kəl), also known in the past as Ercall Magna (/ɑːrkəl mæɡnə/), is a village in the borough of Telford and Wrekin and ceremonial county of Shropshire, England. The civil parish is still called Ercall Magna, and had a total population of 1,679 at the 2001 census, reducing to 1,639 at the 2011 census. The parish includes the villages of Rowton, Ellerdine and Cold Hatton, and a number of hamlets including Cotwall, Osbaston, Poynton and Roden.

The village lies on the junction of the B5062 and B5063 roads.

== History, architecture ==
The etymology of the name Ercall (also seen in Child's Ercall) is obscure. The second part of its name, recorded in the forms "Archelou" and "Erkalwe" in the 13th century, has been suggested as derived from a Celtic word, perhaps an old Welsh name Ercal.

High Ercall was recorded in the Domesday Book as "Archelou": it was stated to have been held by Earl Eduin in the time of Edward the Confessor, when it was worth £20. At the time of the survey it contained two mills and a fishery yielding "1502 great eels" annually.

It is thought a church may have stood in High Ercall since Saxon times, but the present St Michael's Church shows mostly medieval work with a tower dating from the 14th century. The base of the tower is badly weather-beaten. The parishioners, however, have a more romanticised explanation, that the damage is due to people sharpening their weapons on it in ancient times. In the churchyard, as well as graves covering several centuries, there is a sundial from the 18th-century which records the time in Jerusalem, Rome and Plymouth in Massachusetts.

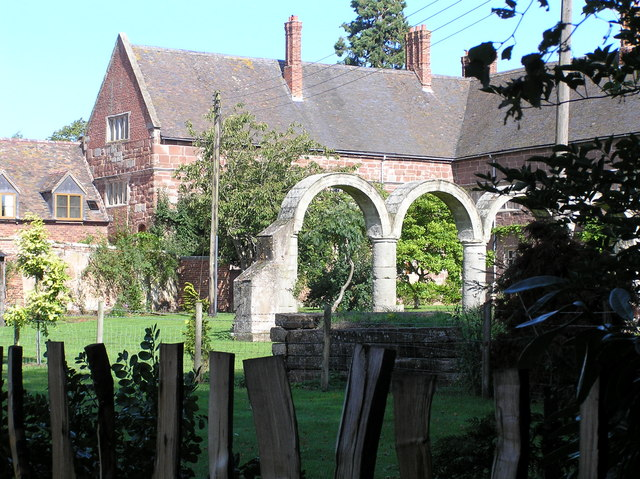
High Ercall Hall (old 16th century building) with arches from demolished 1608 building.

The village is clustered around what remains of High Ercall Hall, originally a fortified 13th-century manor owned by the Arkle family; in the seventeenth century the house was owned by the Newport family, having been rebuilt in 1608 for Sir Francis Newport, the father of Richard Newport, 1st Baron Newport. The Newports were prominent royalists and during the English Civil War Richard garrisoned the Hall for the King. Between 1644 and 1646 the house withstood repeated attacks by local Parliamentarian forces, culminating in a prolonged siege, using artillery, from July 1645. The Royalist commander at High Ercall, Sir Vincent Corbet, eventually surrendered on 28 March 1646. The history and archaeology of this event was covered by the Time Team episode Siege House in Shropshire (series 9, episode 8).

The village also contains some almshouses of 1694, built in brick with small dormer windows.

A short distance from the village is a World War II airfield which as RAF High Ercall was the home of 29 MU, a Royal Air Force maintenance unit. 68 Squadron operated from High Ercall from April 1941 for eleven months before moving to Catterick. The MU opened in 1941 and closed in 1957. The airfield site later became the headquarters for the Road Transport Industry Training Board (RTITB) Multi Occupational Training and Educational Centre (MOTEC 1), home of the RTITB National Junior Mechanic Competition 1987.

An outdoor war memorial to 59 servicemen from the parish of Ercall Magna who have died in wars since 1914, in African iron Greystone granite, was unveiled in the village in April 2017.

== Amenities ==
In addition to a primary school and the church, there is in the village a tennis club.

== Notable people ==
- Sir Richard Newport (by 1511–1570), politician, of family who owned the manor of High Ercall.
- Magdelen Herbert nee Newport (1561 – 1627) estate manager and literary patron, daughter of Richard
- Sir Francis Newport (c1555-1623), politician, son of Richard, lived High Ercall Hall, which he had rebuilt 1608.
- Richard Newport, 1st Baron Newport (1587–1651), latter's son, Civil War Royalist politician, who held Ercall Hall as fortress, made peer in 1642 as Baron Newport of High Ercall.
- Francis Newport, 1st Earl of Bradford (1620–1708), latter's son, Royalist soldier and politician, owned Ercall Hall.
- Andrew Newport (1622–1699), latter's brother, Royalist politician, baptized at the church.
- Richard Baxter (1615–1691), puritan divine, born at Rowton in the parish and baptized at the church.
- Sir Francis Geary, 1st Baronet (1709–1796), Royal Navy Admiral, brought up in High Ercall.
- John Douglas (1721–1807), later Bishop of Salisbury, was vicar of High Ercall 1750–62.
- Archibald Alison (author) (1757–1839), Scottish essayist, was vicar of High Ercall.
- John Ashley Kilvert (1833-1920), survivor of the Crimean War Charge of the Light Brigade and later businessman and Mayor of Wednesbury, was born and educated in High Ercall.
- John Beard (trade unionist) (1871–1950), president of the former Workers' Union, born and died at Ellerdine Heath in the parish.
- Derek Hammond-Stroud (1926–2012), baritone opera singer, died resident at Roden Hall care home in the parish.

=== Sports ===
- Bertha Steedman (1866–1945), born at High Ercall, tennis player, nine times winner of All England Championships at Wimbledon.
- Mary Steedman (1867–1921), born at High Ercall, her sister and wife of Gilbert Vane (Vicar of High Ercall 1889–1895), tennis player, a semi-finalist at Wimbledon. Her husband and daughter are buried in the churchyard.
- John Gwynne (1945-2022), born at High Ercall, sports commentator and reporter, best known for his darts commentary.

== See also ==
- Listed buildings in Ercall Magna
