= Osbaston, Telford =

Coordinates: 52.764°N 2.597°W

Osbaston
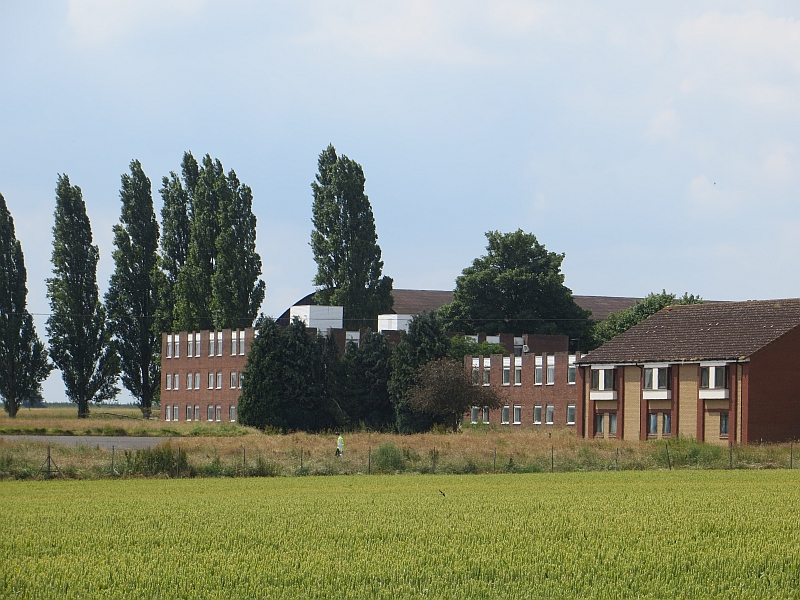
- RAF High Ercall, Osbaston

- Location within Shropshire
- OS grid reference: SJ598187
- Civil parish: Ercall Magna
- Unitary authority: Telford and Wrekin
- Ceremonial county: Shropshire
- Region: West Midlands
- Country: England
- Sovereign state: United Kingdom
- Post town: TELFORD
- Postcode district: TF6
- Dialling code: 01952
- Police: West Mercia
- Fire: Shropshire
- Ambulance: West Midlands
- UK Parliament: The Wrekin

Osbaston is a hamlet in the English county of Shropshire.

Osbaston forms part of the civil parish of Ercall Magna and the unitary authority of Telford and Wrekin, it lies eleven miles north-west from the centre of Telford.
