= Walter Leveson =

English politician and landowner

Sir Walter Leveson
- Born: 1550
- Died: 20 October 1602 (aged 51–52)
- Spouses: Anne Corbet; Susan Vernon
- Issue: Sir Richard Leveson
- Father: Sir Richard Leveson
- Mother: Mary Fitton

Sir Walter Leveson (1550 – 20 October 1602) was an Elizabethan Member of Parliament and a Shropshire and Staffordshire landowner who was ruined by involvement in piracy and mental illness.

== Background and education ==
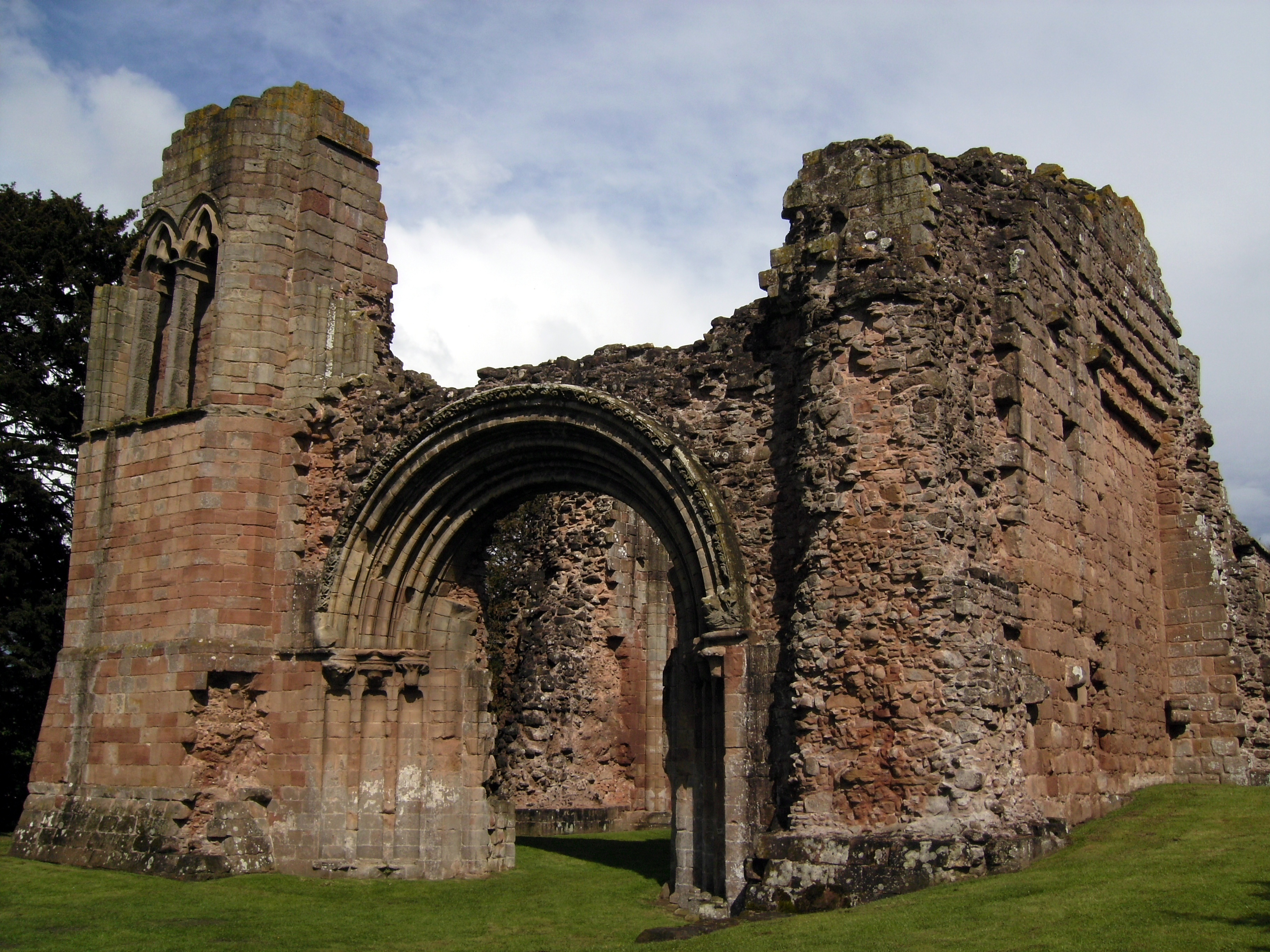
Western end of Lilleshall abbey. The Leveson family lived at a hunting lodge on the site in the 16th and early 17th centuries.

Walter Leveson was the son of Sir Richard Leveson (died 1560) of Lilleshall Abbey and the grandson of James Leveson (died 1547), a Wolverhampton wool merchant who bought Lilleshall in 1539 after the dissolution of the lesser monasteries and built a house on the site. In 1540 James Leveson also bought Trentham Priory, another recently dissolved Augustinian house, and in 1543 the manor of Lilleshall, a large estate around the abbey site which had formerly been part of the abbey demesne. These formed the nucleus of the family estates. The family name is pronounced /ˈljuːsən/ LEW-sən, and could be rendered in many ways in the 16th century, including Lewson, Luson and Lucen.

Leveson's mother was Mary Fitton (1529–1591), daughter of Sir Edward Fitton (died 1548) of Gawsworth, Cheshire, and sister of Sir Edward Fitton (1527–1579) of Gawsworth, a soldier and adventurer who made his fortune in the Tudor conquest of Ireland and rose to be Lord President of Connaught. The family name was sometimes rendered as Futton.

Walter Leveson had two sisters, Mary Leveson, who married Sir George Curzon of Croxall, Derbyshire, and Elizabeth Leveson, who married William Sheldon (died 1587), second son of William Sheldon (died 23 December 1570) of Beoley and Mary Willington.

Sir Richard Leveson died in 1560, when Walter was about 8 years old. As a minor whose father held land of the Crown by knight service, Walter became a royal ward. His wardship was sold to Sir Francis Knollys, whose wife, Catherine Carey, was a cousin of Queen Elizabeth, and who made a fortune from similar royal grants. Walter did not come into full possession of his family's estates until 1572.

Walter Leveson was educated at Shrewsbury School, then a fairly new institution, to which he was admitted in 1562.

== Landowner ==
Leveson's main estates were at Lilleshall and Trentham, although he inherited or acquired many smaller estates and houses. The estates were assessed at £313 at the beginning of his wardship – an income commensurate with landed gentry status. However, Leveson was regionally powerful and influential, not least because he also had lucrative business interests in the North Sea trade – interests which were to prove his undoing. He was ruthless in pursuing his interests in his estates. After a long dispute, he managed to recover possession of Leegomery, near Wellington, Shropshire from his sister Elizabeth and her husband, William Sheldon.

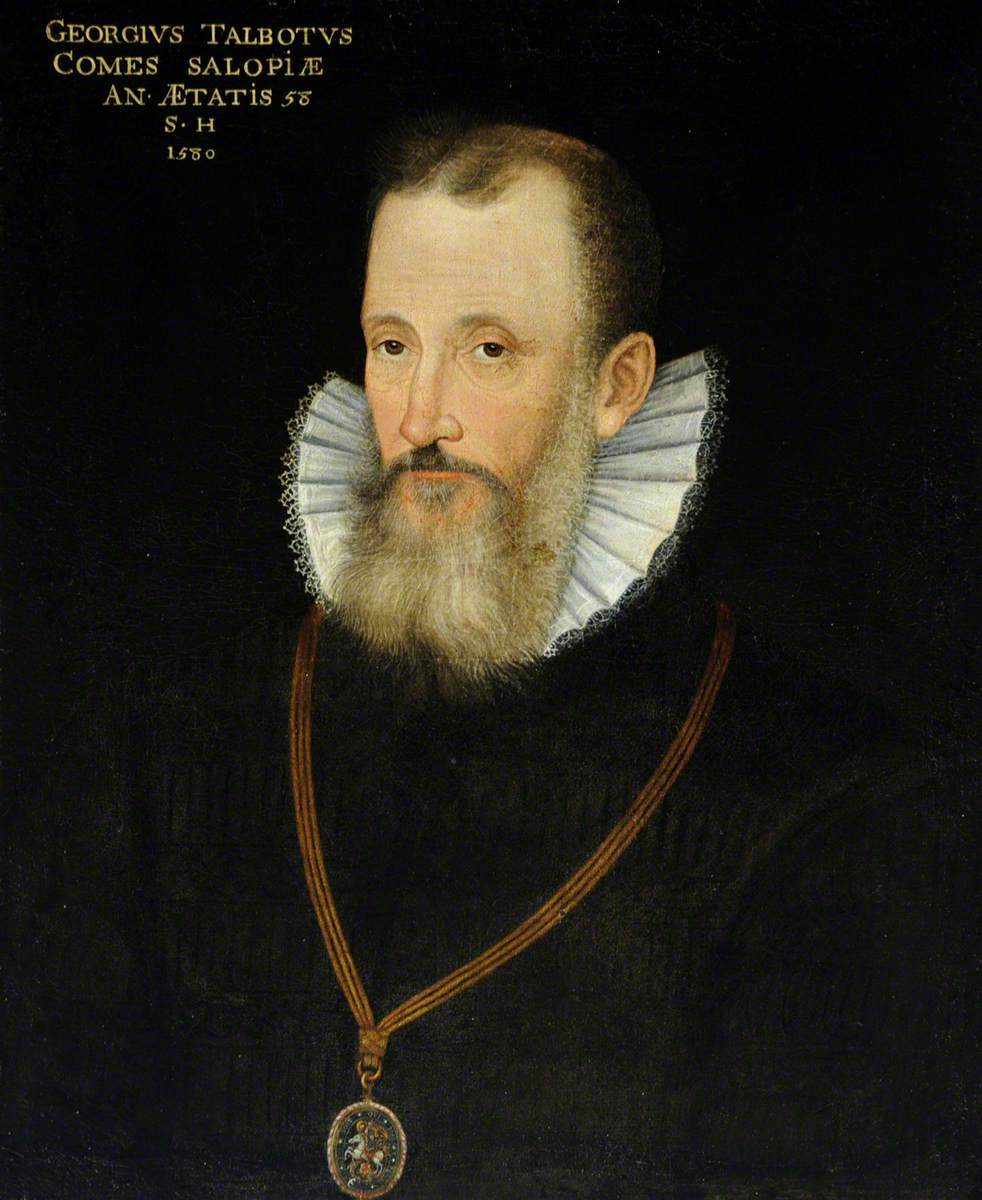
George Talbot 6th Earl of Shrewsbury, a major landowner who made important concessions to Leveson

Leveson, like all his family, was a vigorous encloser. He did all he could to establish effective control of marginal or disputed lands around his estates. This was especially so in the Weald Moors, a large, extra-parochial area, stretching west of Lilleshall, where tenants in all the surrounding manors had common grazing rights. The landowners all wanted to maximise their profit from the moors by draining and improving them, and were determined to have defined boundaries. In 1574 Leveson and the lord of Kynnersley agreed on a fixed boundary. In 1582 George Talbot, 6th Earl of Shrewsbury, who was lord of Wrockwardine, sold his interest in the moor to Leveson for a perpetual rent. Leveson then set about enclosing and improving so that he could let out separate holdings. Very soon the whole area from Wrockwardine to Kynnersley was enclosed by Leveson or his tenants, apart from a few remaining areas of marshy soil. On Leveson's estate at Little Wenlock the tenants had access to the woods for timber, although both their tenth and the rest of the woodland were in poor condition because of poor management and constant extraction of timber for building. Leveson enclosed all the woodland, simply abrogating the commoners' rights.

Agriculture and animal husbandry were not the only ways to exploit the estates. By 1580 Leveson had water-powered trip hammers at Lubstree on Humber Brook, on the moors near Kynnersley. It seems that these were operated by successive member of the Dawe family. Leveson had a bloomery by a pool in Lilleshall village. He also installed a blast furnace, one of the earliest in the West Midlands, possibly at Donnington Wood, near Wrockwardine, where both wood for charcoal burning and ironstone were available. This was also an area of coal mining, although coal was used for domestic heating rather than industrially.

Landed property was the essential foundation for public office, and Leveson was wealthy enough to secure such office very quickly after coming into his estates. In 1575 he was made a Justice of the Peace in Shropshire and within two years he was also a justice in Staffordshire. He was pricked High Sheriff of Shropshire for 1575–6, although it was not until 1586-7 that he became High Sheriff of Staffordshire. By then he had been appointed deputy to Robert Dudley, 1st Earl of Leicester in his position as Vice-Admiral of the Coast for North Wales. In 1587 he was knighted. This coincided with the onset of the problems which overwhelmed him with debt in later life.

Financial problems forced Leveson increasingly to adopt emergency measures after 1590. In that year he sold two of the smaller estates to Sir Rowland Hayward: Little Dawley and Little Wenlock. However he kept together his main estates at Lilleshall and Trentham, ensuring that they remained part of the Leveson patrimony.

Leveson constantly needed ready cash to keep his creditors at bay, and one way of realising the future value of his estates was to sell leases. In the areas of Lilleshall exploited by the open field system, where leases had typically been for periods of 21 years or less, he began to grant longer leases, generally for three lives. He resorted to this strategy also at Weald Moor, selling leases for three lives to his tenants so long as they agreed to maintain the infrastructure of roads, bridges and watercourses. In 1592 he granted 13 leases at Donnington Wood on a single day, this time mainly for short terms, allowing the tenant to clear the enclosed areas for pasture. However, he was in partnership with his brothers-in-law, Vincent and Richard Corbet, to exploit the industrial wealth, so he reserved the right to the timber, underwood and minerals. In the previous year Leveson had leased all his Shropshire ironworks, furnaces, forges, and hammers to his brothers-in-law for 10 years.

== Parliamentary career ==
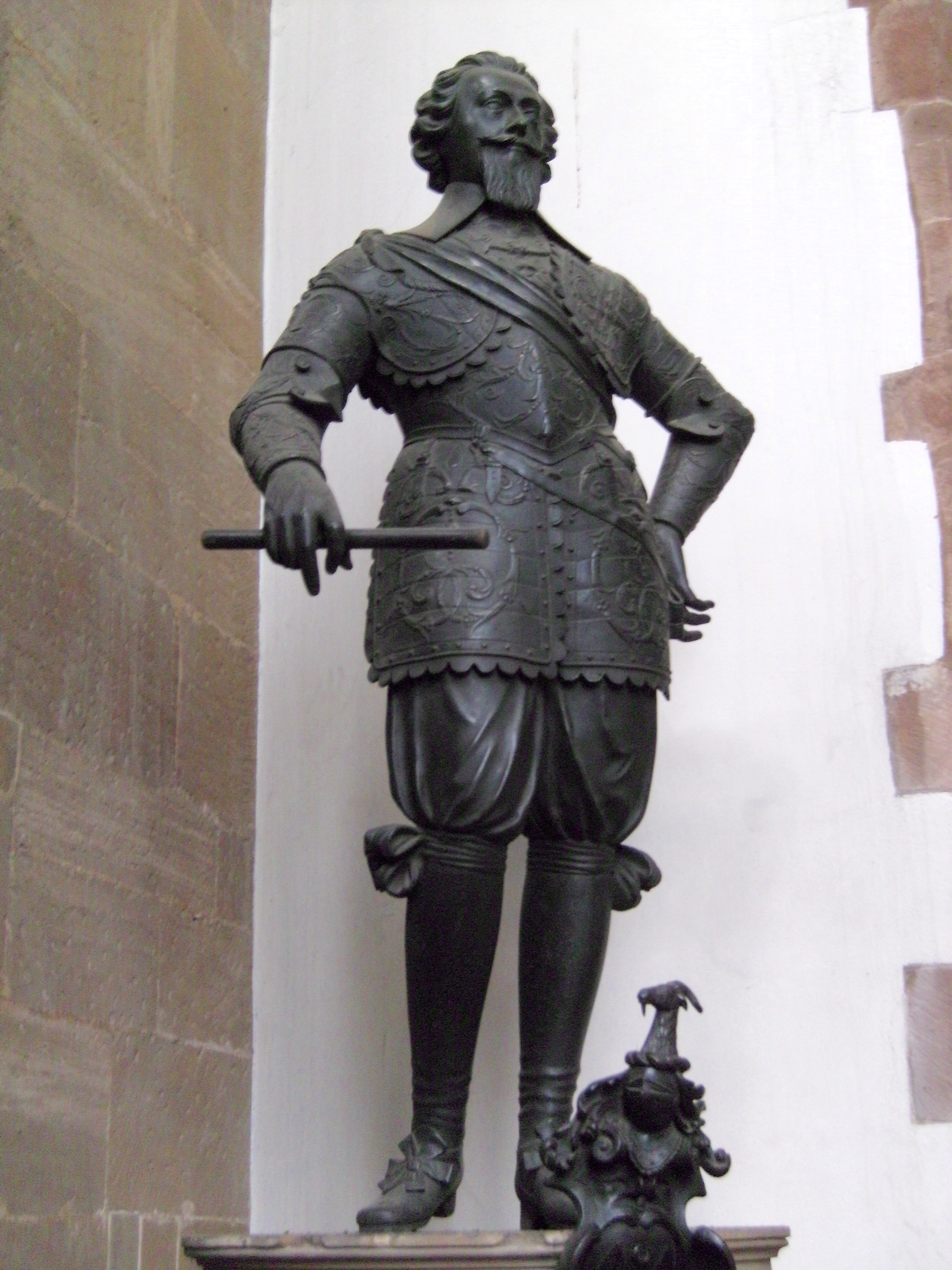
Vice Admiral Richard Leveson. Walter's son. Statue in St Peter's Collegiate Church, Wolverhampton.

Leveson represented Shropshire in three successive parliaments: those of 1584, 1586–87, and 1589 (elected in 1588). This was a notable record for the period, when landowners in the region were generally reluctant to devote too much time to political business, which could be expensive. Walter's father, Sir Richard, had been a knight of the shire for Shropshire. Walter's father-in-law, the able and energetic Sir Andrew Corbet, had been vice-president of the powerful Council of Wales and the Marches. The Levesons and the Corbets together had ample power and wealth in the county to secure the election of their own candidates. As a result, the members of parliament for the county were drawn from a small pool. In 1584 Leveson was elected alongside Francis Bromley, the son of the powerful judge George Bromley and nephew of Thomas Bromley, the Lord Chancellor: both immensely powerful men in the region. In 1586 the other knight of the shire was Richard Corbet, Leveson's brother-in-law. In 1588 Walter Leveson was placed first in order of precedence over his own son, Sir Richard Leveson.

Leveson was to sit in parliament only once more: in 1597–98. This time he sat for Newcastle-under-Lyme. The change of constituency was significant. Overwhelmed by debt, he sought the protection of parliamentary privilege for a few months. As he could no longer depend even on his family and in-laws to support him, he quit Shropshire for Newcastle, his local borough, where, as lord of Trentham, he could exercise unrivalled influence.

== Decline and fall ==
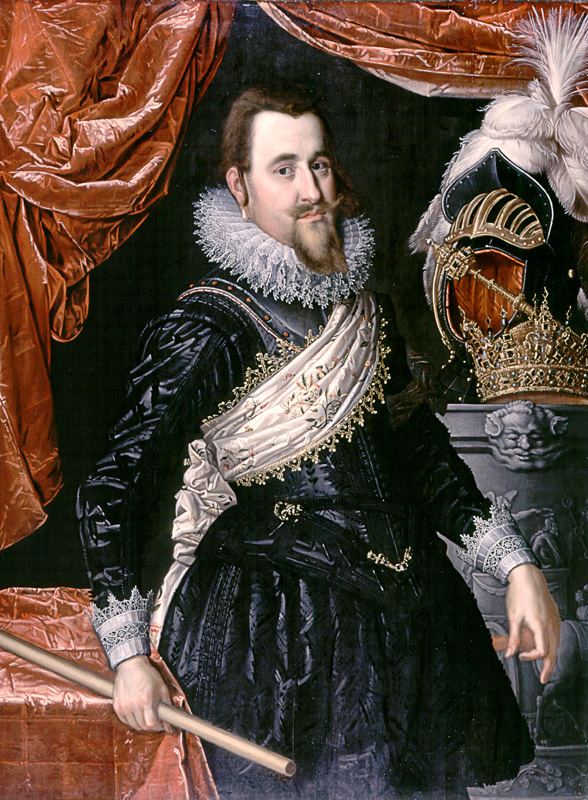
Christian IV of Denmark.

The vast change in Leveson's fortunes began with a complaint in December 1587 that his men had seized goods from Danish vessels at a port in Norway. The principal complainant was one John Paul, who appears to have suffered considerable losses. Denmark–Norway was a single entity held together by a personal union of crowns at this time, and although correspondence about the case is always said to emanate from Christian IV of Denmark, he was actually a minor, and power resided in a regency council until 1596. The delicate situation in Denmark, and the importance of the country as part of an alliance of Protestant powers, made it imperative that the English authorities respond rapidly and in an exemplary manner. The Admiralty court ordered Leveson to pay compensation of £2300, a vast sum, and committed him to prison pending payment. He came to terms with his creditor, and on 25 August 1588 a letter in King Christian's name – but signed by the governors Kaas, Munck, Rosenkrantz, and Valckendorff – was received by the English ambassador in Copenhagen:

"Thanking her Majesty for the restitution promised for a spoil committed by Sir Walter Luson upon the King's subject John Paul; and praying that the said John, now coming over to receive satisfaction according to the agreement between him and Luson, may be assisted by her Majesty's favour, should Luson seek to make any delays. Also that he may be relieved of all interest and charges."

Leveson was out of prison in time to take part in the elections of 7 November 1588. However, this cannot have been the end of the matter. There were clearly other letters from Denmark, and as late as March 1590 a draft reply from England made the point that "Sir Walter Leweson, knight, hath been apprehended for payment to be made unto Paulson the Dane" and that "John Paulson complains against Sir Walter Leweson, now in prison, from whom if so much might be paid as would deliver the poor man from prison it would be some satisfaction."

In the meantime there had been further complaints. This time Leveson's crews were among a number accused of attacking Dutch shipping in the North Sea, and the offences predated the attacks in Norway.

"In August and November, 1586, Sir Walter Lucen's ships spoiled 3 fishing boats and another, all of Holland, off the Scottish coast. Goods worth over 2,850l. sterling taken, and some of the men murdered and buried in the sands near the Isle of Wight, "not as Christians, but as dogs". No redress yet, despite complaints and letters from the States. "One of them, named John Jacobson Decker, died for mere thought and pensiveness of heart, crying out to his last hour against Sir Walter Lucen". Yet Lucen gave satisfaction for a Danish ship spoiled by the same people at about the same time. Despite his promises made before the Lord High Admiral, Lucen will never appear before indifferent judges unless compelled by the Queen or Council's express command."

Once again, this was an attack on the shipping of an allied, largely Protestant nation at a time when England was involved in confrontation with Catholic Spain and the French Catholic League. Leveson was far from the only offender, for Sir Walter Raleigh is named in the same complaint. However, Leveson's crew had behaved far worse than others, killing allied sailors. This case too was prolonged by Leveson's prevarication and broken promises. On 5 July, for example, the States-General of the Netherlands was complaining that he had not even turned up for the arranged hearing. He even failed to appear when summoned by the Privy Council. He did manage to obtain temporary royal protection for part of 1590, and his appearance in parliament in 1597 was part of a similar strategy of avoidance. However, for the rest of his life he was hounded by his creditors.

In March 1598, no longer having parliamentary immunity, Leveson was cornered by his creditors at Lambeth, and committed to the Fleet prison. While he was imprisoned, one Robert Wayland accused him of sorcery and other "ungodly practices". The allegations included attempts to poison several people, including his daughter-in-law, Margaret, daughter of Charles, Lord Howard of Effingham, the Lord High Admiral. Embarrassing to his now eminent son, Sir Richard Leveson, and potentially fatal to himself, these allegations alarmed Leveson enough to make him appeal to the most important men in court and government. A letter of December 1598 to Robert Devereux, 2nd Earl of Essex was summarised thus for Sir Robert Cecil:

"In extremity of law his property and all monies owing to him are in her Majesty, by reason of some secret outlawries upon malice taken out against him. Although her Majesty does not usually take advantage thereof of her subjects, yet some of his adversaries, because of his last marriage, are confederate to entitle her thereto. For preventing this, prays Essex to move the Queen to grant that property to him (Essex), into whose hands he is willing to put his whole estate, or else to his brother Vernon. Lies imprisoned for debt, but has more money owing to him than his debts amount to, and by suing his own debtors in the Queen's right he can recover the same to satisfy his creditors and pay the fines due for his outlawries."

Leveson had come to the conclusion that all his misfortunes were due to some wide-ranging plot against him, although the motives of his persecutors varied in his telling of the tale. Here it was jealousy of his second marriage to Susan Vernon, who was Essex's first cousin. Later he became convinced that his son and one Ethell were at the root of the conspiracy, as he intimated to Cecil in April 1600:

"Let not my letters, I beseech you, be troublesome to you, for out of my grieved soul I write. I desire you that my accuser may come to my face, and if it be Ethell, either send for him into England, or give me leave to send for him. Meantime, I desire you to suspend your opinion of me, and if before his face I do not justify myself an honest man, let me receive the extremest punishment that may be inflicted."

By the end of the year, Leveson was telling Cecil that he had "lately fallen ill, which will turn to very great inconvenience, and groweth only by his being closed in a dark melancholy lodging." He died in the Fleet on 20 October 1602, leaving large debts to his son and heir, Richard, who outlived him by less than three years and was often out of the country. The burden of administering the estates thus fell on Walter's second cousin, Sir John Leveson of Halling, Kent, and subsequently on John's wife, Christian, who was ultimately able to stabilise the situation. It was the son of John and Christian, another Richard Leveson (1598–1661), who was left to inherit what remained of the Leveson fortune.

== Marriages and family ==
Leveson married firstly Anne Corbet the daughter of Sir Andrew Corbet of Moreton Corbet and Jane Needham, the daughter of Sir Robert Needham of Shavington, by whom he had his son and heir, Sir Richard Leveson. A daughter, Penelope Leveson, married the courtier Sir John Tunstall.

Leveson married secondly Susan Vernon, also known as Susanna, the granddaughter of George Vernon (d.1555), and the daughter of John Vernon (d.1592) of Hodnet, Shropshire, by Elizabeth Devereux (c.1541-c.1583), the daughter of Sir Richard Devereux (d. 13 October 1547) of Weobley by his wife, Dorothy Hastings, daughter of George Hastings, 1st Earl of Huntingdon (1487–1544), by whom he had no issue. Susan was the sister of Elizabeth Vernon, later Countess of Southampton, and Sir Robert Vernon, Comptroller of the Household to Queen Elizabeth I, and a first cousin of Robert Devereux, 2nd Earl of Essex.
