= Derek Hammond-Stroud =

English opera singer (1926–2012)

Derek Hammond-Stroud OBE (10 January 1926 – 14 May 2012) was an English baritone opera singer best known for his performances of German lieder and his international performances in opera, particularly the roles of Alberich in Wagner's Der Ring des Nibelungen, Herr Faninal in Der Rosenkavalier and Beckmesser in Die Meistersinger von Nürnberg. He also made recordings, including a series of recordings of the Gilbert and Sullivan patter roles.

== Life and career ==
Born in London, Hammond-Stroud was educated at the Salvatorian College, Harrow and studied optometry at Northampton Institute, graduating in 1949. He then studied voice at Trinity College of Music in London and abroad with Elena Gerhardt and Gerhard Hüsch.

His concert debut was in 1955, with the UK premiere of Joseph Haydn's L'anima del filosofo (also known as Orfeo ed Euridice) at the St Pancras Festival. Hammond-Stroud made his lieder recital debut in 1956 at the Wigmore Hall, accompanied by Gerald Moore. His stage debut came in 1957 as Publio in La Clemenza di Tito. With Sadler's Wells Opera, his roles included Papageno in The Magic Flute, Dr. Bartolo in Il barbiere di Siviglia and Melitone in Forza del Destino. There, he was also noted for his superb comic acting and fine diction in several Gilbert and Sullivan roles, including Ko-Ko in The Mikado.

For ten years from 1961, Hammond-Stroud was a principal baritone with the English National Opera. He also appeared regularly at The Proms beginning in 1968. He became particularly known for performances as Alberich in Wagner's Der Ring des Nibelungen, Herr Faninal in Der Rosenkavalier and Beckmesser in Die Meistersinger von Nürnberg. In such roles, Hammond-Stroud sang "with a strong, agreeable tone" and "brought the words vividly to life." He also excelled in such modern opera roles as the vicar in Albert Herring. Operatic engagements included Covent Garden, the Metropolitan Opera, Munich State Opera, Theater an der Wien, the Netherlands Opera, the Teatro Colón in Buenos Aires, and Glyndebourne.

Hammond-Stroud performed numerous recitals in partnership with Moore, Geoffrey Parsons and others, including performances at the Royal Festival Hall, Wigmore Hall, Concertgebouw in Amsterdam and the Schubert-Saal in Vienna. His concert and oratorio performances included appearances at the Edinburgh, Aldeburgh, Cheltenham, Windsor and English Bach Festivals. In 1986 he inaugurated the Malta Festival of Music with a performance of Schubert's Winterreise song cycle. He appeared regularly at the BBC Prom Concerts, and sang in Spain, Iceland and Denmark. He also taught extensively. In retirement, from the late 1990s, he enjoyed playing chess and studying philosophy.

After hospitalisation, he moved into Shropshire in 2009 to go into a care home at Roden near Shrewsbury. He died there three years later, aged 86.

== Recordings and television ==
Hammond-Stroud recorded extensively in both opera and Lieder. He sang in the BBC television premieres of Sir William Walton's The Bear and Façade at the Royal Albert Hall, the Aeolian Hall and at the Edinburgh Festival. For the BBC, between 1966 and 1989, Hammond-Stroud also recorded his ENO and other Gilbert and Sullivan roles, including nearly the entire series of "patter" roles in 1989, as well as the roles of Reginald Bunthorne and Lord Chancellor in the 1982 Brent Walker videos of Patience and Iolanthe. He was praised for his 1979 live recording of Schubert's Winterreise, with Geoffrey Parsons.

== Honours ==
In 1976 Hammond-Stroud was made an Honorary Member of the Royal Academy of Music and in 1982 an Honorary Fellow of Trinity College of Music. He was the recipient of the Sir Charles Santley Memorial Gift and in 1987 was appointed an Officer of the Order of the British Empire (OBE).
