= Ellerdine =

Hamlet in Shropshire, England

Coordinates: 52.783°N 2.580°W

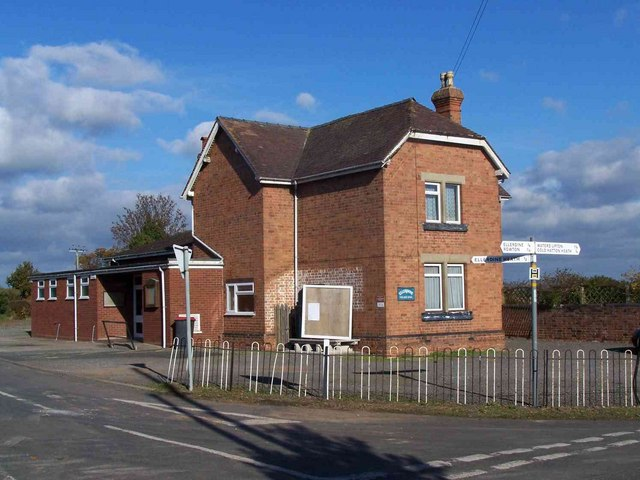
- Ellerdine village hall

- Location within Shropshire
- OS grid reference: SJ608207
- Civil parish: Ercall Magna
- Unitary authority: Telford and Wrekin
- Ceremonial county: Shropshire
- Region: West Midlands
- Country: England
- Sovereign state: United Kingdom
- Post town: TELFORD
- Postcode district: TF6
- Dialling code: 01952
- Police: West Mercia
- Fire: Shropshire
- Ambulance: West Midlands
- UK Parliament: The Wrekin

Ellerdine (/ɛlərdaɪn/) is a small hamlet located six miles north of the market town of Wellington, Shropshire.

It is located at the convergence of six ancient footpaths and comprises two small communities; Ellerdine and Ellerdine Heath and is located within the parish of Ercall Magna, the administrative centre of which is in the neighbouring village of High Ercall. The village consists of a number of scattered farms and cottages with a small cluster of council houses.

Local attractions include Ellerdine Lakes, one of the main trout fisheries in the county

The area is served by one Public House officially known as The Royal Oak, the establishment is known locally as The Tiddly

The village benefits from the presence of a well equipped Village Hall

== History ==
Prior to the Norman Conquest it is recorded that Ellerdine was held by a free man named Dodo. It is next recorded that Henry II gifted the manor to Iorwerth Goch as a reward for his services as an interpreter during the Welsh-English border wars. The manor subsequently passed through several hands. By the nineteenth century, the manor was in the possession of Henry de Vere Vane, 9th Baron Barnard of the County of Durham. Following his death in 1918, the manor passed to his son Christopher William Vane, 10th Baron Barnard, who in 1930, split up the manor and sold off the plots, giving first refusal to the tenants, many of whom took the opportunity to purchase their own properties.

Historically there was a standing stone within the village, thought to date from medieval times but it has recently been removed

In 1926, fourteen council houses were built near the village school, each with its own pigsty, they all shared a communal water pump. Twenty-eight years later in 1954 another ten homes were constructed opposite and the area received a brick water tower complete with an electric pump to supply water to all the houses. This remained in use until 1965, when mains water was piped to the village.

John Beard (1871-1950), the trade union leader, was born at Ellerdine Heath, educated at the local Primitive Methodist day school, and died while staying at the village. His ashes were scattered in nearby Rowton churchyard.

== The railway ==
Ellerdine Halt was a stop on the Wellington and Market Drayton Railway, which was opened in 1867 and operated by the Great Western Railway Company. In 1930, Ellerdine Siding was opened, with a large weighbridge and a brick hut for its custodian. However, lack of use forced the line to close to passenger traffic on 9 September 1963, and to freight four years later.

== Religion and Education ==
The Wesleyan Methodists are the only religious group to build a place of worship within the village boundaries. Emmanuel Chapel was opened at Ellerdine Heath in 1813. However, in 1847, a section of the congregation split away to establish a Primitive Methodist group, they built another Chapel further down the lane, which was named Bethel Chapel and in 1866 they opened a Methodist day school attached. The two chapels rejoined in the late 1960s, the Bethel Chapel was closed and demolished and the Emmanuel Chapel was renamed The Ellerdine Heath Wesleyan Methodist Chapel and is still in use today

The Anglican community in Ellerdine worship at All Hallows Church in the nearby village of Rowton. The church was built by architect Geoffrey Smith in 1881 and is served from High Ercall

The founders of The John & Eliza Bourne Trust were residents of Ellerdine and lived at White House Farm.

In the 1880s the Primitive Methodist School became The Ellerdine School and a new building was opened in January 1884, it was later designated a County Primary School but was closed on 31 August 1992.
