= Moulins-en-Tonnerrois =

- Commune
- Location of Moulins-en-Tonnerrois
- Location within France Location within Bourgogne-Franche-Comté
- Coordinates: 47°43′57″N 4°02′07″E
- Country: France
- Region: Bourgogne-Franche-Comté
- Department: Yonne
- Arrondissement: Avallon
- Canton: Chablis
- Area^{1}: 15.13 km^{2} (5.84 sq mi)
- Highest elevation: 296 m (971 ft)
- Lowest elevation: 193 m (633 ft)
- Population (2023): 111
  - Density: 7.34/km^{2} (19.0/sq mi)
- Time zone: UTC+01:00 (CET)
  - Summer (DST): UTC+02:00 (CEST)
- INSEE/Postal code: 89271 /89310
- ^{1} French Land Register data, which excludes lakes, ponds, glaciers > 1 km^{2} (0.386 sq mi or 247 acres) and river estuaries.

Moulins-en-Tonnerrois is a commune in the Yonne department in Bourgogne-Franche-Comté in north-central France.

== See also ==
- Communes of the Yonne department
