= Cold Hatton =

Village in Shropshire, England

Coordinates: 52.786°N 2.559°W

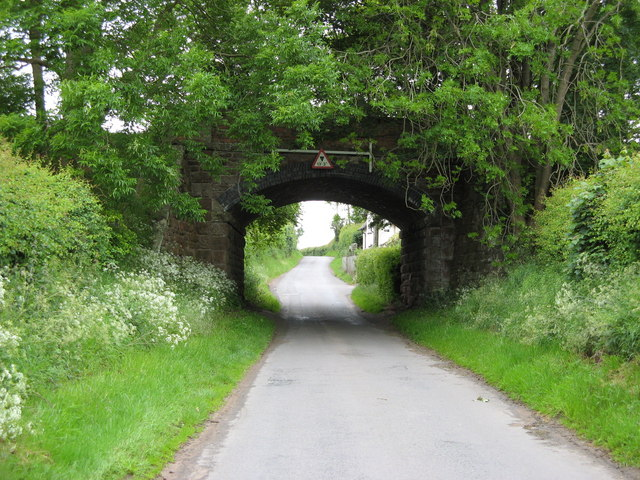
- Former railway bridge, Cold Hatton

- Location within Shropshire
- OS grid reference: SJ623211
- Civil parish: Ercall Magna
- Unitary authority: Telford and Wrekin
- Ceremonial county: Shropshire
- Region: West Midlands
- Country: England
- Sovereign state: United Kingdom
- Post town: TELFORD
- Postcode district: TF6
- Dialling code: 01952
- Police: West Mercia
- Fire: Shropshire
- Ambulance: West Midlands
- UK Parliament: The Wrekin

Cold Hatton is a small village in Shropshire, England, approximately six miles south of Hodnet near the confluence of the River Tern and River Meese. It is in the civil parish of Ercall Magna. Since 1998 it has been part of the Telford and Wrekin unitary district.

== Etymology ==
The name Hatton is derived from the Old English hæþ-tun, meaning "settlement on the heath". The affix "cold", in English placenames, usually is taken to refer to a village's cold or exposed location. There is another hamlet called Cold Hatton Heath immediately to the east.

== History ==
The area was formerly a manor held by Lilleshall Abbey, and later formed part of the estates of the Duke of Sutherland, who had a number of houses built in the village using local red sandstone.
