= St Michael's Church, High Ercall =

Coordinates: 52.7522°N 2.6021°W

- St Michael and All Angels' Church, High Ercall
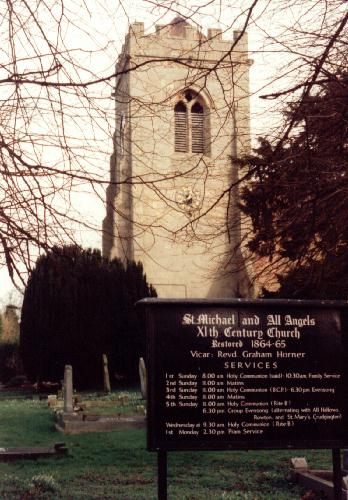
- Tower of St Michael's Church, High Ercall

- Location in Shropshire
- OS grid reference: SJ 595 174
- Location: High Ercall, Shropshire
- Country: England
- Denomination: Anglican
- Website: High Ercall S.Michael and All Angels, High Ercall

History
- Status: Parish church

Architecture
- Functional status: Active
- Heritage designation: Grade I
- Designated: 18 June 1959
- Architect: G. E. Street (restoration)
- Architectural type: Church
- Style: Transitional, Gothic

Specifications
- Materials: Sandstone, tiled roofs

Administration
- Province: Canterbury
- Diocese: Lichfield
- Archdeaconry: Salop
- Deanery: Wrockwardine
- Parish: Ercall Magna

Clergy
- Vicar: Preb David Chantrey

St Michael's Church is in the village of High Ercall, Shropshire, England. It is an active Anglican parish church in the deanery of Wrockwardine, the archdeaconry of Salop, and the diocese of Lichfield. Its benefice is united with those of twelve local churches. The church is recorded in the National Heritage List for England as a designated Grade I listed building.

== History ==
The nave and aisles date from the late 12th century, and the chancel from the early 14th century. The north chapel was endowed in 1334. The church was badly damaged in 1645–46 during the Civil War, and was repaired and reconstructed between 1657 and 1662. In 1864 G. E. Street carried out a restoration, and added the south porch and vestry. In 1998 a new bell-ringing floor was inserted in the tower, which allowed the creation of a kitchen and toilets below it.

== Architecture ==
=== Exterior ===
St Michael's is constructed in sandstone ashlar, and has a tiled roof. The colour of the sandstone in the tower is mainly grey, and elsewhere it is a mixture of red and grey. The plan consists of a three-bay nave, north and south aisles, a south porch, a chancel with a north chapel and a south vestry, and a west tower.

The tower is Perpendicular in style. It has a west window, and a stair turret to the north. On the north, west and south sides are clock faces, and above them are three two-light bell openings. At the top of the tower is an embattled parapet with a low spirelet and a weathervane. Below the parapet are gargoyles and a quatrefoil frieze. The base of the tower is badly weather-beaten. The parishioners, however, have a more romanticised explanation, that the damage is due to people sharpening their weapons on it in ancient times.

There are three-light windows along both aisles, in the north and east walls of the chapel, and in the east and south walls of the chancel. All the north and south windows in the body of the church are straight-headed. There are doorways on both sides of the aisles, that on the south side being in the porch.

=== Interior ===
Inside the church are three-bay arcades in Transitional style, with circular piers, and capitals carved with volutes, foliage, and rams' heads. The two-bay arcade between the chancel and chapel is carried on octagonal piers. The nave, chancel, and chapel each has a double-hammerbeam roof. In the north wall of the nave is a re-set early Norman tympanum. The reredos, sedilia, piscina, pulpit, and font are all in a simple design by Street. The chandelier is by William Bradshaw, and is dated 1730. The floors are tiled throughout. Under the chapel arch is the stone effigy of a recumbent knight, dated by his armour to the 1330s. Also in the church is a bronze sundial plate dated 1718. This was removed from the churchyard in 1998 and re-set on a stoup. In the chapel and tower is stained glass of 1863–64 by Lobin et fils of Tours. Elsewhere are windows by Heaton, Butler and Bayne dating from between 1895 and 1910. The two-manual pipe organ was built in 1856 by Walker. It was rebuilt in 1894 by Charles Martin, and restored in 1956, again by Walker. There is a ring of eight bells. Six of these were cast between 1707 and 1767 by Rudhall of Gloucester, and the other two in 1812 by John Briant.

On the north wall are two memorial Rolls of Honour. The older is to men of the parish "of Ercall Magna" who served, including those who died, in World War I (called "the European War" on the roll) which bears the motto, Honour to those who helped to right the wrong and is designed surrounded with shields bearing flags of the British home nations and allied nations, and pictures showing battleships, a gun, tank, aircraft and soldiers in a trench. The page indicates it was printed at the Co-Operative Printing Works in Longsight, Manchester. The other is to members of No. 247 Squadron RAF, (known as the China-British Squadron) who died in World War II, during which the unit were stationed at RAF High Ercall. To the side of the list of names is a poem titled The China Brits.

== External features ==
In the southern part of the churchyard are the remains of a churchyard cross dating from the early-medieval period. It consists of a truncated shaft, and a base that contains a vertical hollow. The cross is included in the Grade I listing of the church. It is also a scheduled monument. The boundary wall of the churchyard, constructed in sandstone, is listed at Grade II.

In the churchyard, as well as graves covering several centuries, there is a sundial from the 18th-century which records the time in Jerusalem, Rome and Plymouth in Massachusetts.

The churchyard contains nine Commonwealth war graves, of six British soldiers of World War I and a British airman and two Canadian airmen of World War II.

== See also ==
- Grade I listed churches in Shropshire
- Listed buildings in Ercall Magna
