= Noel Hill =

Noel Hill may refer to:

- George Noel Hill (1893–1985), British architect
- Noel Hill (musician) (1958), Irish concertina-player
- Noel Hill & Tony Linnane, 1978 album
- Noel Hill (rugby league) (1927–1965), Australian rugby league footballer

Barons Berwick of Attingham:

- Noel Hill, 1st Baron Berwick (1745–1789)
- Thomas Noel Hill, 2nd Baron Berwick (1770–1832)
- William Noel-Hill, 3rd Baron Berwick (1773–1842)
- Richard Noel-Hill, 4th Baron Berwick (1774–1848)
- Richard Noel Noel-Hill, 5th Baron Berwick (1800–1861)
- William Noel-Hill, 6th Baron Berwick (1802–1882)
- Richard Henry Noel-Hill, 7th Baron Berwick (1847–1897)
- Thomas Henry Noel-Hill, 8th Baron Berwick (1877–1947)
- Charles Michael Wentworth Noel-Hill, 9th Baron Berwick (1897–1953)

== See also ==
- Noel Hill (Antarctica)
