= Sophia Dubochet =

English courtesan (1794–1875)

The Right Honourable The Lady Berwick

Personal details
- Born: Sophia Dubochet; 29 June 1794
- Died: 29 August 1875 (aged 81) Leamington Spa
- Spouse: Thomas Noel Hill, 2nd Baron Berwick (m. 1812; died 1832)
- Domestic partner: George Coventry, 8th Earl of Coventry
- Relations: Harriette Wilson (sister)
- Parent(s): John James Dubochet; Amelia Cook Dubochet

Sophia Dubochet (29 June 1794 – 29 August 1875), also known as "Sophia Wilson", was an English courtesan, who became the wife of Thomas Noel Hill, 2nd Baron Berwick.

== Early life ==
Sophia was the daughter of John James Dubochet, a Swiss clockmaker who worked in Mayfair, London, and his wife, Amelia (née Cook) Dubochet. Another of their daughters was Harriette Wilson. Another sister, Amy, later had an illegitimate child by George William Campbell, 6th Duke of Argyll, who had also been Harriette's lover.

== Personal life ==
According to Harriette's memoirs, the teenage Sophia, "a remarkably shy, proud girl", was being pursued by Viscount Deerhurst, and Harriette recommended to her mother that Sophia be sent away to school. However, she eloped with Deerhurst, who, when found by her family, "declared that nothing wrong had occurred, he having passed the night with Sophia in mere conversation". Nevertheless, he moved her into squalid lodgings.

Sophia quickly built up her own circle of admirers, including William FitzGerald, 2nd Duke of Leinster, and George Lamb. Initially, she claimed to dislike Berwick, but was eventually persuaded to marry him.

=== Marriage to Lord Berwick ===
On 8 February 1812, seventeen year old Sophia married forty-one year old Thomas Noel Hill, 2nd Baron Berwick at St Marylebone Parish Church, London, after an on-off courtship. They had no children. At Brighton, the new Lady Berwick was both admired and reviled for her lack of "illustrious descent". A local paper commented that "the late abuse of the press has in no degree diminished the vivacity so characteristic of her ladyship and family." However, it has been suggested that, after her marriage, Sophia deliberately snubbed her sisters.

The couple's extravagance was such that Lord Berwick went bankrupt in 1827. They were forced to sell most of their property, lease the house to his brother and live abroad. Lord Berwick died in Naples in 1832 and the barony was inherited by his younger brother, William Noel-Hill who became the 3rd Baron Berwick. Lady Berwick retired to Leamington Spa, where she died in her eighties.

== Legacy ==
Her portrait in miniature was painted by Richard Cosway in about 1812, and is held in the collection at Attingham Park.
