= Linda White Mazini Villari =

Author and translator

Linda White Mazini Villari (née White) (1836–1915) was an author and translator. She translated many of the works of her second husband, Pasquale Villari, into English. She was the widow of Vicenzo Mazini.

== Family ==
Linda Mary White was born in 1836, the daughter of James White and Mary, née Lind, a botanical artist. She married the silk merchant Vincenzo Constanzo Mazini (ca. 1829–1869) in October 1861 in Kensington; they had a daughter, Costanza Maria Orsola Mazini (born 1863). Costanza married the artist William Stokes Hulton and was the mother of Teresa and Gioconda Hulton. Teresa became the 8th Lady Berwick of Attingham Park, Shropshire.

Linda Villari's second marriage to Pasquale Villari produced a son, Luigi Villari.

== Publications ==
- In the Golden Shell. A story of Palermo (London, 1872)
- In Change unchanged (2 volumes, London, 1877)
- Camilla's Girlhood (T Fisher Unwin, London, 1885)
- On Tuscan Hills and Venetian Waters (T Fisher Unwin, London, 1885)
- When I was a child; or, Left behind (T F Unwin, London, 1885)
- Here and there in Italy and over the Border (W H Allen & Co, London, 1893)
- Oswald von Wolkenstein. A memoir of the last Minnesinger of Tirol (J M Dent & Co, London, 1901).

== Translations ==
=== Works by Pasquale Villari ===
- Niccolò Machiavelli and his times (2 volumes, London, 1878)
- Life and times of Girolamo Savonarola (2nd edition, 2 volumes, T Fisher Unwin, London, 1889)
- The Two First Centuries of Florentine History (2 volumes, T Fisher Unwin, London, 1894–1895)
- The Barbarian Invasions of Italy (T Fisher Unwin, London, 1902)
- Studies, Historical and Critical (T Fisher Unwin, London, 1907).

=== Other works ===
- Mór Jókai, Life in a Cave, from the Hungarian (W Swan Sonnenschein & Co, London, [1884])
- HRH Prince Luigi Amedeo di Savoia, Duke of the Abruzzi, The Ascent of Mount St Elias, Alaska (A Constable & Co, Westminster, 1900)
