= William Stokes Hulton =

British artist (1852–1921)

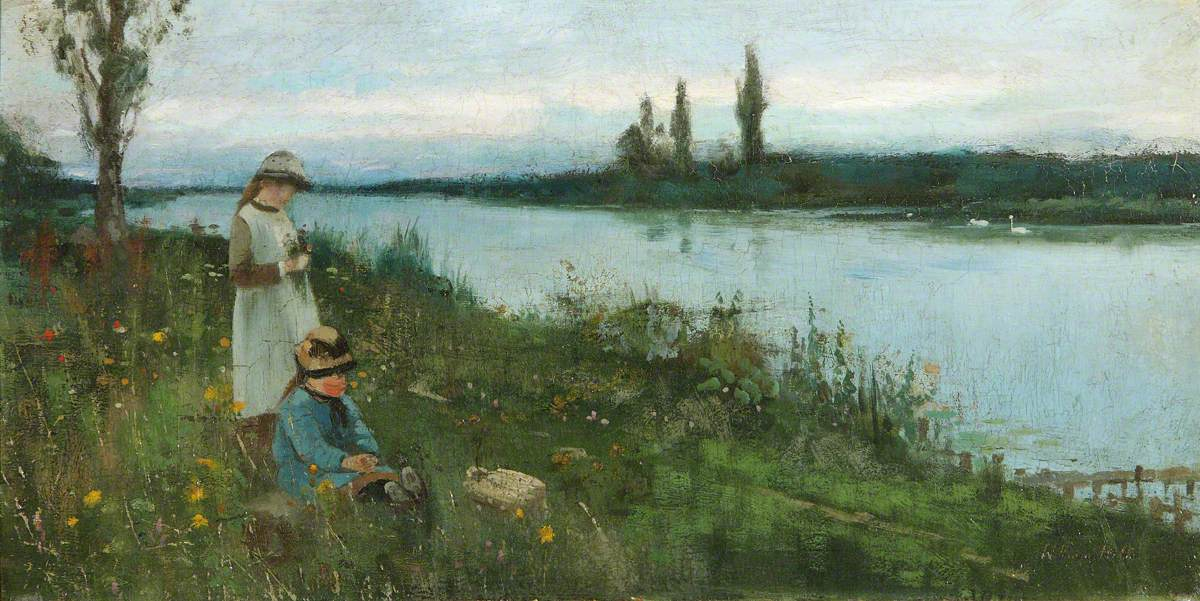
On the Banks of the Ouse, by Hulton, 1900

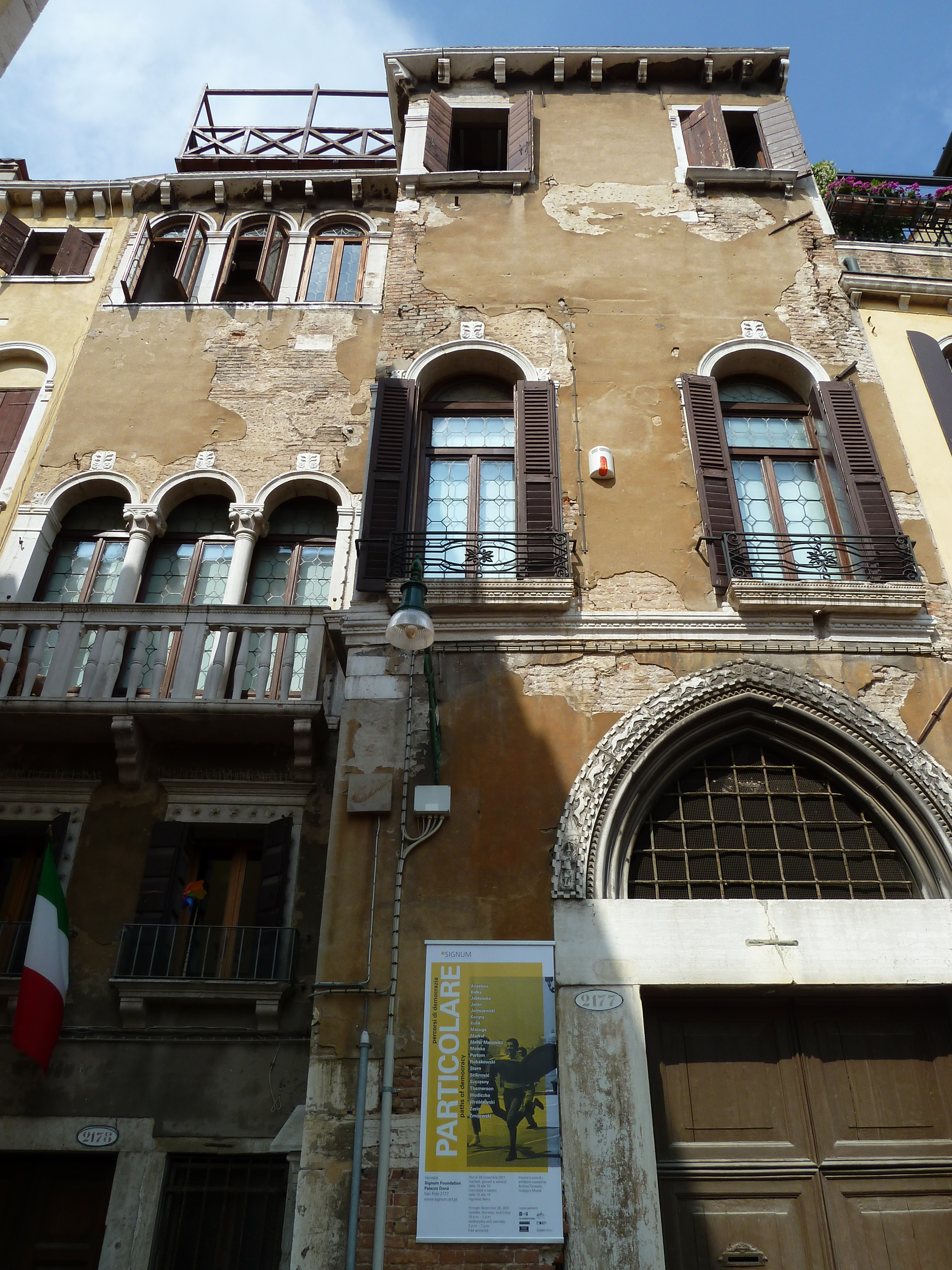
Palazzo Donà, Venice, in 2011

William Stokes Hulton (23 October 1852 – 1921) was a British artist.

William Stokes Hulton was born in 1852, the son of Rev. Campbell Basset Arthur Grey Hulton (1813–1878) and Sarah Stokes Fletcher.

He was friends with John Singer Sargent as well as Reginald Barratt and Walter Sickert, with whom he would go on painting trips to Italy.

Hulton married Costanza, the daughter of English author and translator Linda White Mazini Villari, and stepdaughter of Pasquale Villari, an Italian historian and politician. The Hultons lived in Palazzo Donà in Venice.

They had two daughters. Gioconda "Gio" Hulton was born in Venice on 5 October 1887, died 18 September 1940 in a motor coach accident while travelling to arrange repatriation to England, and was buried in Nice, France. Edith Teresa "Bim" Hulton, known as Teresa, was born in 1890. In 1919 she married Thomas Henry Noel-Hill, 8th Baron Berwick. She lived at Attingham Park until her 1972 death in a car accident.
