= Charles Baldwyn =

British politician (1729–1801)

Charles Baldwyn (1729–1801) was a British politician who sat in the House of Commons from 1766 to 1780.

Baldwyn was the son of Charles Baldwyn of Bockleton and his wife Elizabeth Allgood, daughter of John Allgood of Newcastle upon Tyne and was baptized on 29 September 1729. He matriculated at St Mary Hall, Oxford in 1747. In April 1751 his father died and he succeeded to the estates. He married Catherine Childe, daughter of William Lacon Childe, MP for Shropshire on 14 May 1752. The Baldwyns were old Shropshire gentry and several generations of the family had sat in Parliament for Ludlow.

Baldwyn was elected Member of Parliament for Shropshire in a by-election on 8 May 1766 which was uncontested after a threat of Whig opposition. He was the choice of the Shropshire Tories and of Lord Powis, a ministerialist by preference under George II and George III. Baldwyn was re-elected unopposed in 1768 and 1774. In 1779, at the end of his parliamentary career, The Public Ledger published a character sketch of him as ‘A puzzle-headed country gentleman, of Tory principles. Votes constantly with the minister, and avers that Kings and Governments, let their actions be what they will, must and ought to be supported. The extent of his compliance with Governments is somewhat exaggerated On matters about which the country gentlemen felt strongly, Baldwyn would go against the Government. Less than a dozen speeches by him are recorded during his 14 years in Parliament.

Baldwyn did not stand in 1780 by which time his financial position was precarious. He received a secret service pension but it is uncertain how long he had it but payments are mentioned between March 1779 and July 1780. On 27 Aug. 1782 Baldwyn wrote to Shelburne, then First Lord of the Treasury:

I little thought I should be under the necessity of ever becoming so humble a petitioner [...] being disappointed of assistance where I had the greatest reason to expect it, I have no prospect of being able to extricate myself from my difficulties, or even preserve my liberty, unless I [...] obtain some relief from Government [...] though an advocate for public economy, I am persuaded you wish to encourage such acts of royal benevolence, as are unmixed with corruption. [...]

He enclosed a printed leaflet of three pages, Case of Charles Baldwyn, Esq. He claimed to have ruined himself for the sake of his eldest son, who now refused to come to his financial rescue. The story is unconvincing: it is one of bad bargains with every member of the family he had to deal with; and while denying that he had gambled, he admits having speculated: he purchased ‘estates when land sold very dear’; borrowed money ‘the interest whereof is since raised’; and afterwards was ‘under a necessity of selling estates very cheap’. Still, he claims that, while he ‘impaired his finances [...] he has served his son to whose welfare indeed he had in a great measure sacrificed his own fortune, his liberty, all the comforts of life, and perhaps his life itself, for as he finds his health much injured, he doubts not but his existence will be shortened by his uneasiness of mind.’

Baldwyn died on 28 September 1801.

Parliament of Great Britain
Preceded by Sir John Astley; Richard Lyster	Member of Parliament for Shropshire; 1766–1780; With: Sir John Astley 1766-1772; Sir Watkin Williams-Wynn 1772-1774; Noel Hill 1774-1780	Succeeded by Noel Hill; Sir Richard Hill
