= Le Invasioni Barbariche in Italia =

Le Invasioni Barbariche in Italia is Professor Pasquale Villari's popular account of the barbarian invasions of the Roman Empire from the Antonines to the coronation of Charlemagne in 800 A.D. as Holy Roman Emperor. The book was first published in 1901 by Ulrico Hoepli in Milan.

The book, with 3 maps and about 500 pages, was intended to be easy to read and appealing to the general reader of Italian. Hoepli published the second, third, and fourth editions in 1905, 1920 and 1928. In the book, Villari's main focus is on the Teutonic invasions of the 3rd through 6th centuries A.D.

In 1902 Fisher Unvwin published a 2-volume translation (The Barbarian Invasions of Italy) by Linda Villari, the wife of Pasquale Villari.

Madame Villari's translation is verbally as accurate as might have been expected; but somehow it lacks the attractiveness of the original.

The figures of the chief actors in this strife of centuries — Alaric, Attila, Genseric, Theodoric, Justinian, Belisarius, Alboin — are well and forcibly drawn by Professor Villari.
