= Pasquale Villari =

Italian historian and politician (1827–1917)

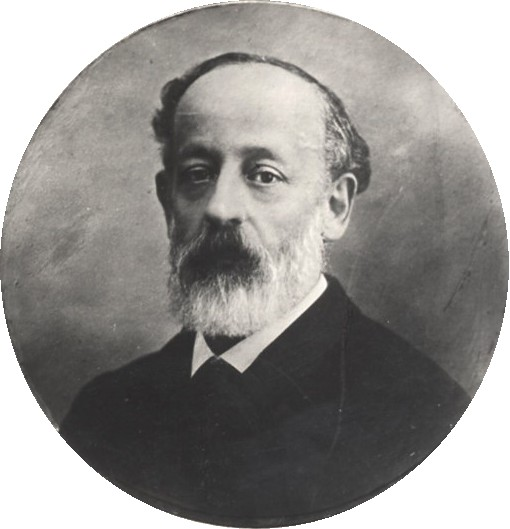
Senator Pasquale Villari

Pasquale Villari (3 October 1827 – 11 December 1917) was an Italian historian and politician. Many of his works were translated into English by his wife, Linda White Mazini Villari, with whom he had Luigi Villari.

== Early life and publications ==
Villari was born in Naples and took part in the risings of 1848 there against the Bourbons and subsequently fled to Florence. There he devoted himself to teaching and historical research in the public libraries with the object of collecting new materials on Girolamo Savonarola. He published the fruits of his research in the Archivio Storico Italiano in 1856, and in 1859 he published the first volume of his Storia di Girolamo Savonarola e de' suoi tempi, in consequence of which he was appointed professor of history at Pisa. A second volume appeared in 1861, and the work, which soon came to be recognized as an Italian classic, was translated into various foreign languages.

It was followed by a work of even greater critical value, Niccolò Machiavelli e i suoi tempi (1877–82). In the meanwhile Villari had left Pisa and was transferred to the chair of philosophy of history at the Institute of Studii Superiori in Florence, and he was also appointed a member of the council of education (1862). He served as a juror at the international exhibition of that year in London, and contributed an important monograph on education in England and Scotland.

== Enters politics ==
In 1869 he was appointed under-secretary of state for education, and shortly afterwards was elected member of parliament, a position which he held for several years. In 1884 he was appointed senator, and became vice-president of the senate in 1887. In 1891-1892 he was minister of education in the Marchese di Rudini's first cabinet, and introduced valuable reforms into the curriculum of the schools. In 1893-1894 he collected a number of essays on Florentine history, originally published in the Nuova Antologia, under the title of I primi due secoli della storia di Firenze, and in 1901 he produced Le Invasioni Barbariche in Italia, a popular account in one volume of the events following the dissolution of the Roman Empire.

== Other works ==
Among his other literary works may be mentioned: Saggi Critici (1868); Arte, Storia, e Filosofia (Florence, 1884); Scritti varii (Bologna, 1894); another volume of Saggi Critici (Bologna, 1896); and a volume of Discussioni critiche e discorsi (Bologna, 1905), containing his speeches as president of the Dante Alighieri Society. His most important political and social essays are collected in his Lettere Meridionali ed altri scritti sulla questione sociale in Italia (Turin, 1885), and Scritti sulla questione sociale in Italia (Florence, 1902). The Lettere Meridionali (originally published in the newspaper L'Opinione in 1875) produced a deep impression, as they were the first exposure of the real conditions of southern Italy.

== Family ==
Pasquale's younger brother Emilio Villari became a physicist. In 1876, the historian married Linda Mazini (née White), an English woman.

His son Luigi Villari was also a historian. His stepdaughter, Costanza, married the artist William Stokes Hulton. They had two daughters, Gioconda Mary Hulton and Edith Teresa Hulton. Edith Teresa Hulton became the 8th Lady Berwick of Attingham Park in Shropshire upon her marriage to Thomas Henry Noel-Hill, 8th Lord Berwick, in 1919.
