= Sir Watkin Williams-Wynn, 4th Baronet =

British politician and landowner (1749–1789)

Sir Watkin Williams-Wynn Bt
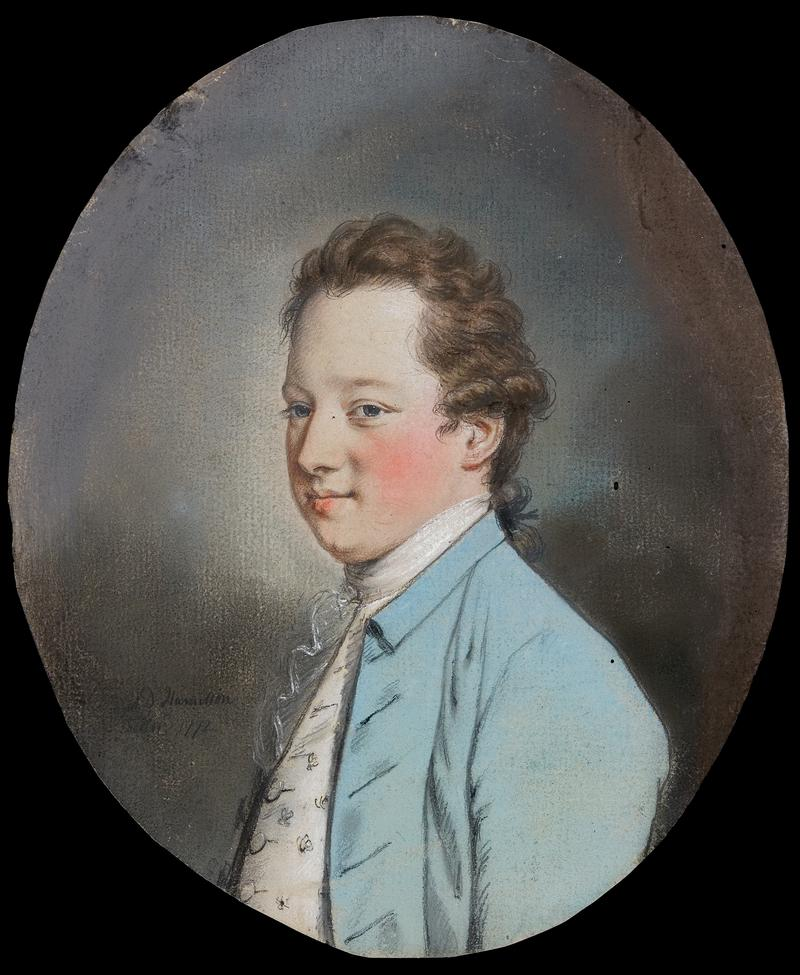
- Portrait by Hugh Douglas Hamilton, 1772

Member of Parliament for Denbighshire
- In office 1774–1789
- Preceded by: Sir Lynch Cotton, Bt.
- Succeeded by: Robert Watkin Wynne

Member of Parliament for Shropshire
- In office 1772–1774 Serving with Charles Baldwyn
- Preceded by: Richard Lyster; Charles Baldwyn
- Succeeded by: Noel Hill; Charles Baldwyn

Personal details
- Born: 23 September 1749
- Died: 24 July 1789 (aged 39)
- Spouses: Lady Henrietta Somerset (m. 1769; died 1769) Lady Charlotte Grenville (m. 1771)
- Children: 7, including Watkin, Charles, and Henry
- Parent(s): Sir Watkin Williams-Wynn, 3rd Baronet; Frances Shackerley

Sir Watkin Williams-Wynn, 4th Baronet (23 September 1749 – 24 July 1789) was a British politician and landowner who represented Shropshire and Denbighshire in the House of Commons of Great Britain from 1772 to 1789. The Williams-Wynn baronets had been begun in 1688 by the politician Sir William Williams, 1st Baronet, but had inherited, in the time of the 3rd baronet, Sir Watkin's father, the estates of the Wynn baronets, and changed their name to reflect this.

== Early life ==
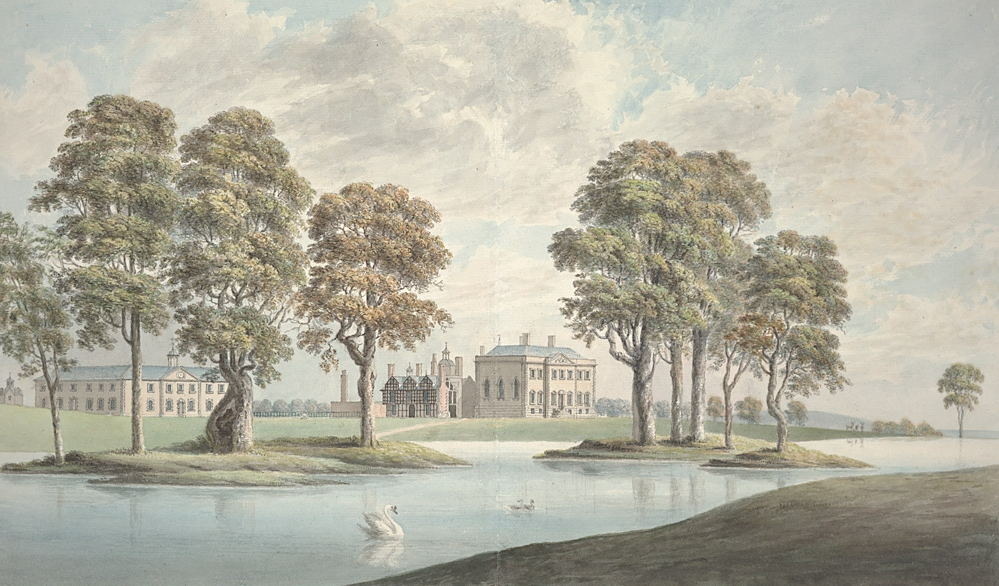
Wynnstay the family seat, 1793

Williams-Wynn was the eldest son of the second marriage of his father, Sir Watkin Williams-Wynn, 3rd Baronet, to Frances Shackerley of Cheshire. He was a baby when his father was killed by a fall from his horse while out hunting, and he inherited the extensive Wynnstay estates, the largest in North Wales. These straddled at least five Welsh counties and extended into Shropshire in England, and yielded an estimated rental income of £20,000 – a very substantial sum at the time, whose spending he tackled with enthusiasm and considerable success.

On his coming of age in 1770, he held an extravagant party for 15,000 guests; the bills record consumption of "31 bullocks, 50 hogs, 50 calves, 80 sheep, 18,000 eggs...." An embroidered suit which he may have worn on this occasion is in the possession of the National Museum of Wales.

== Career ==
Williams-Wynn's family had been powerful in politics for several generations, and Sir Watkin effectively controlled several Parliamentary seats and led a Tory faction in the House of Commons, though he was less involved in politics than his father, and tended not to lead his faction decisively. The influence of the family had declined during his long minority.

He served as a Member of Parliament for Shropshire from 1772 to 1774, and for Denbighshire from 1774 until his death in 1789 aged 39. He was criticised for poor attendance. He was Lord Lieutenant of Merionethshire from 1775 to 1789.

=== Patron of the arts ===
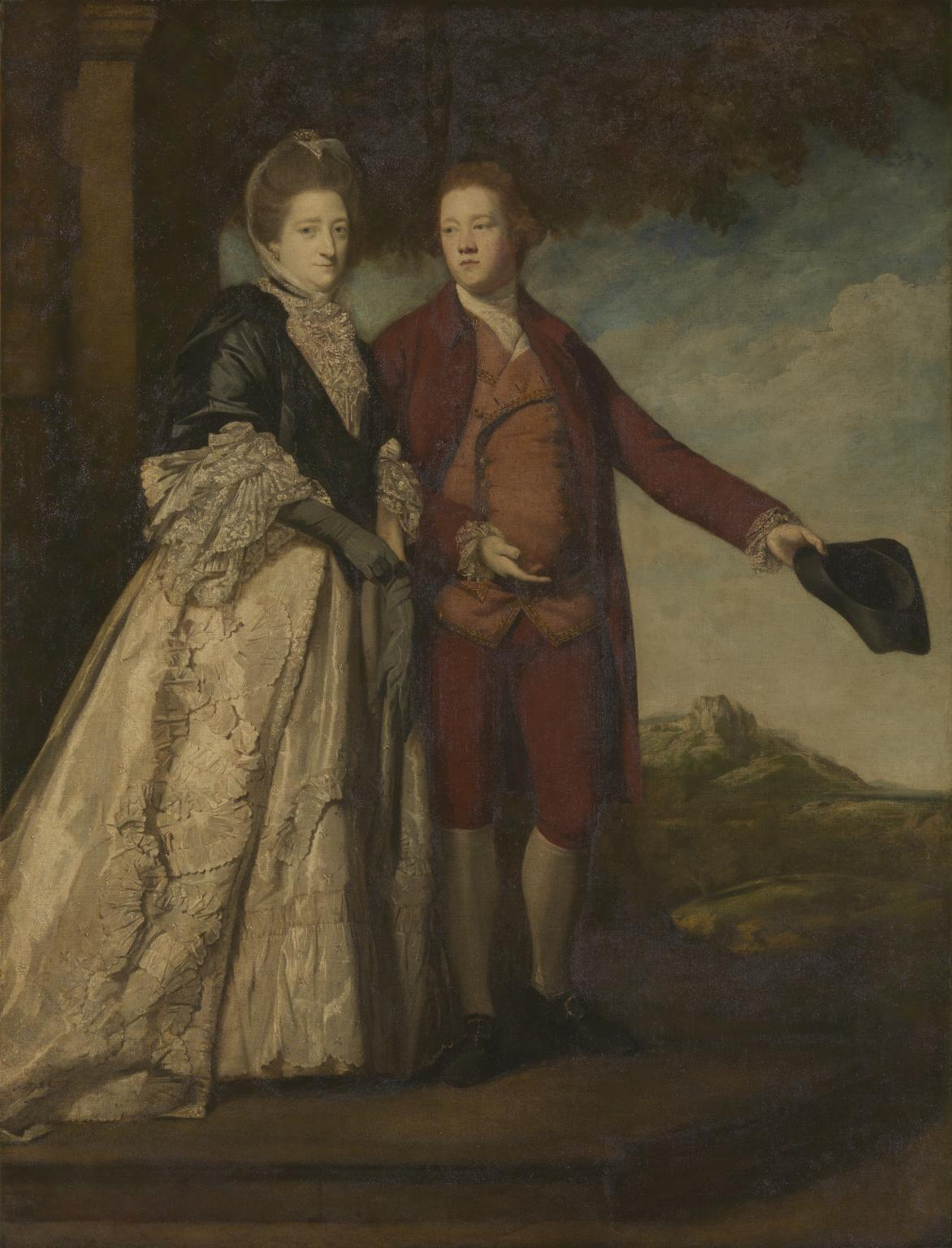
Portrait of Williams-Wynn and his mother by Sir Joshua Reynolds, ca. 1768

Sir Watkin made a Grand Tour to Europe from June 1768, returning by February the next year for his wedding in April. In Rome Pompeo Batoni painted him with some companions, and a classical subject, Bacchus and Ariadne was commissioned later, in 1774. The Rococo silver-gilt toilet service he gave to his first wife, by the London goldsmith Thomas Heming, is now in the National Museum of Wales. The Neoclassical grave monument for her is by Joseph Nollekens, in St Mary's Church, Ruabon, Clwyd.

Sir Watkin played a significant role in the development of art in Wales, as an early patron of landscape painting there, which was to become the largest area of artistic activity in Wales. He brought both Richard Wilson and Paul Sandby to his seat at Wynnstay. Wilson was commissioned to produce two large landscapes Dinas Bran from Llangollen and View near Wynnstay which were displayed at the Royal Academy Exhibition of 1771. Sandby stayed six weeks in the summer of 1770, giving lessons to the family as well as painting, on his first visit to Wales. The next year Sandby returned and from 21 August to 4 September 1771 he and Sir Watkin toured through the mountains of northern Wales. From the sketches made on the tour Sandby published twelve aquatint Views in North Wales in 1776, and five of his Views in Wales in 1777. Matching sets from South Wales came from his tours there with Sir Joseph Banks, who commissioned the whole series. A more ambitious tour together, to Italy, was planned but cancelled after Sir Watkin's second marriage.

He supported the Concerts of Antient Music, and is caricatured by James Gilray in a depiction of King George III of Great Britain attending one he organised.

== Personal life ==
He was married twice, first in April 1769 to Lady Henrietta Somerset, daughter of Charles Somerset, 4th Duke of Beaufort. As Williams-Wynn was a minor (under 21) he had to get Parliamentary permission by a special Act for the marriage settlement. Lady Henrietta died very shortly afterwards in July 1769.

Secondly, in December 1771 he married Lady Charlotte Grenville, daughter of a former Whig Prime Minister. Together, they had four sons and three daughters, including:

- Sir Watkin Williams-Wynn, 5th Baronet (1772–1840), who married Lady Henrietta Antonia Clive, eldest daughter of Edward Clive, 1st Earl of Powis, and Henrietta Clive, Countess of Powis, in 1817.
- Frances Williams-Wynn (1773–1857), who remained unmarried, and whose political Diaries were published posthumously in 1864.
- Charlotte Williams-Wynn (1775–1819), who married Lt-Col William Shipley, MP for Flint Boroughs and St Mawes, and son of the Very Rev. William Davies Shipley.
- Charles Williams-Wynn (1775–1850), who married Mary Cunliffe, daughter of Sir Foster Cunliffe, 3rd Baronet, and Harriet Kinloch, in 1806.
- Henrietta Elizabeth Williams-Wynn (1780–1852), who married Thomas Cholmondeley, 1st Baron Delamere of Vale Royal.
- Sir Henry Williams-Wynn (1783–1856), who married Hon. Hester Frances Smith, daughter of Robert Smith, 1st Baron Carrington, in 1813.

Sir Watkin died on 24 July 1789.

=== Residence ===
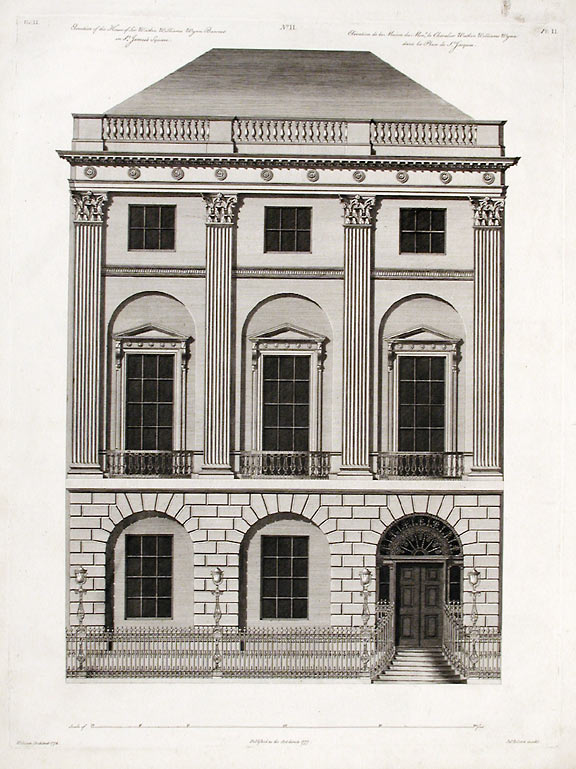
20 St James's Square

Sir Watkin commissioned Robert Adam to build 20–21 St James's Square in London which was constructed between 1771 and 1775. Sir Joshua Reynolds received several commissions from Sir Watkin, some of which remain with the family. These include a portrait of him with his first wife in "Van Dyck" costume, and another of his second wife with her children, in around 1784, one with his mother (1768–69, National Gallery, London), one of Sir Watkin presiding over the Society of Dilettanti (1777, now on loan to Brooks's), and one of his eldest son as John the Baptist.

== Coat of arms ==
Coat of arms of Sir Watkin Williams-Wynn, 4th Baronet
Crest An eagle displayed or. Escutcheon Quarterly, 1st and 4th, Vert three eagles displayed in fesse or (Wynn), 2nd and 3rd, Argent two foxes counter-salient Gules the dexter surmounted of the sinister (Williams). Motto Eryr Eryror Eryri (The eagle of the eagles of Snowdon)

== Notes ==
Parliament of Great Britain
Preceded by Richard Lyster; Charles Baldwyn	Member of Parliament for Shropshire; 1772–1774; With: Charles Baldwyn	Succeeded by Noel Hill; Charles Baldwyn
Preceded by Sir Lynch Cotton, Bt.	Member of Parliament for Denbighshire; 1774–1789	Succeeded by Robert Watkin Wynne
Honorary titles
Preceded by William Vaughan	Lord Lieutenant of Merionethshire; 1775–1789	Succeeded by Watkin Williams
Baronetage of England
Preceded by Watkin Williams-Wynn	Baronet (of Gray's Inn); 1749–1789	Succeeded by Watkin Williams-Wynn
