= Luigi Villari =

Italian historian and diplomat (1876–1959)

Luigi Villari (1876–1959), son of Pasquale Villari and Linda White Mazini Villari, was an Italian historian, traveler and diplomat. He worked in the Italian Foreign Office and was later a newspaper correspondent. Villari served as Italy's Vice-Consul in three American cities: New Orleans (1906), Philadelphia (1907) and Boston (1907–10). He devoted most of his life to the study of international problems, more especially to the relations between Italy and the English-speaking countries. He also authored numerous books and travelogues including those dedicated to his travels in the late Russian Empire.

== Selected publications ==
- Villari, Luigi, ed. (1905). The Balkan question: The Present Condition of the Balkans and of European Responsibilities. New York: E. P. Dutton and Company – via Internet Archive.
- Villari, Luigi (1906). Fire and sword in the Caucasus. London: T. F. Unwin – via HathiTrust.
