= William Mostyn Owen =

British land-owner and politician

William Mostyn Owen (c. 1742–11 March 1795), born William Mostyn, was a British land-owner and politician who sat in the House of Commons from 1774 to 1795.

== Early life ==
William Mostyn was born c. 1742, the eldest son of William Mostyn of Bryngwyn, and his wife Grace Wynn, daughter of Robert Wynn of Plas Newydd.

He was educated at Oriel College, Oxford, where he matriculated in 1761, and studied law at the Middle Temple, where he was admitted in 1759. He later succeeded to the estate in Woodhouse, Shropshire, of his cousin, John Lloyd Owen, and thereafter took the name Owen.

== Career ==
Until the early 1770s, the two main families in Montgomeryshire were the Wynns of Wynnstay and the Herberts of Powis Castle. Up to 1772, the families were allied in their agreement over whom to return as the county's single Member of Parliament; Edward Kynaston was their choice, but he died in 1772, followed by Henry Herbert, 1st Earl of Powis. The Wynns appointed one of their kin, Watkin Williams, after Kynaston's death, but at the 1774 election, the Dowager Lady Powis nominated Owen as the Herbert candidate, in opposition to Williams. A long contest followed, and Owen received the support of the smaller land-owners, whilst Williams gained the backing of the most substantial ones; in the end the Herberts contributed the most money and Owen won the election.

In Parliament, despite initially voting with Frederick North, Lord North, he switched to the opposition for the rest of his premiership. This upset Lord Powis, who supported the government, but at the 1780 election, the Wynns, who were opposition supporters, backed Owen and he was re-elected unopposed; the same was true for 1784. During the 1780s, he again voted with the opposition for the most part and opposed William Pitt the Younger throughout his premiership. He was considered a Portland Whig by 1792, but his ill health caused his attendance to decline, and he died on 11 March 1795. He was never recorded speaking in the house.

== Personal life ==
He married Rebecca Dod, daughter of Thomas Dod of Edge, Cheshire (c. 1688–1759). With her, he had the following issue:

- William Mostyn Owen (died 1849), who succeeded to his father's estates, and who married Harriet Elizabeth Cumming, eldest daughter of Major T. Cumming of Bath and had issue.
- The Reverend Edward Henry Owen (died 1839), a Fellow of All Souls College, Oxford, and rector of Cound, Shropshire (from 1816), who married Elizabeth Sophia Hinchliffe, second daughter of the Rev. Edward Hinchliffe of Barthomley, Cheshire, and had issue.
- Rebecca Owen, who married John Humffreys of Llywn, Montgomeryshire.
- Frances Maria Owen (died 1840), who married Richard Noel-Hill, 4th Baron Berwick (1774–1848), and had issue.
- Harriet Owen, who married John Mytton of Halston, Shropshire (1768–1798)
- Sobieski Owen (died 1858), who married Richard Betenson Dean (1772–1850), chairman of the board of Customs.
- Eloisa Owen (died 1872), who married the Rev. Henry Cotton, Rector of Hinstock, Vicar of Great Ness, Shropshire, and had issue.
- Laura (Mostyn) Owen (died 1864).

He died on 11 March 1795 and was succeeded in his estate by his eldest son, William Mostyn Owen.

=== Descendants ===
Through his eldest son, his granddaughter was, Frances Mostyn Owen, who was married to MP Robert Myddelton Biddulph (1805–1872), the brother of Thomas Myddelton Biddulph (1809–1878), an officer in the British Army and courtier, both of them sons of MP Robert Myddelton Biddulph (1761–1814).

Through his daughter, Frances Maria Owen, he was grandfather to Richard Noel Noel-Hill, 5th Baron Berwick (1800–1861). Through another daughter, Harriet Owen, he was the grandfather of John Mytton (1796–1834), an eccentric Member of Parliament for Shrewsbury from 1819 to 1820.

Parliament of Great Britain
Preceded by Watkin Williams	Member of Parliament for Montgomeryshire; 1774–March 1795	Succeeded by Francis Lloyd
