= Harriette Wilson =

English courtesan and writer

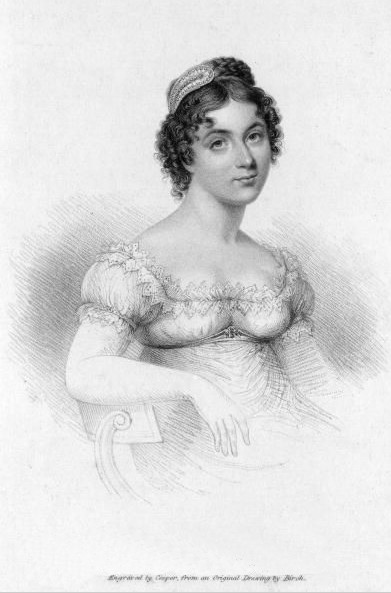
- Portrait engraved by Cooper, from original drawing by Birch
- Born: 2 February 1786; Mayfair, London, England
- Died: 10 March 1845 (aged 59); Chelsea, London, England
- Occupations: Memoirist, Courtesan, poet
- Spouse: William Henry Rochfort
- Parent(s): John James Dubouchet; Amelia Cook Dubochet

Harriette Wilson (2 February 1786 – 10 March 1845) was an English courtesan and writer. The author of The Memoirs of Harriette Wilson: Written by Herself (1825), she was a famed Regency era courtesan who became the mistress of the Earl of Craven at the age of 15. Later in her career, she went on to have formal relationship arrangements with the Duke of Wellington and other prominent people.

== Early life ==
Harriette Dubouchet's birth at 2 Carrington Street, in Shepherd Market, Mayfair, London, was recorded in the parish register of St George, Hanover Square. Her father was a Swiss clockmaker who worked in Mayfair, London, and kept a shop with his wife, Amelia, née Cook. Her father is said to have assumed the surname of Wilson about 1801.

One of the fifteen children of Swiss John James Dubouchet (or De Bouchet), Wilson was one of four sisters in the family who pursued careers as courtesans. Her sisters Amy, Fanny and Sophia also became courtesans. In her memoir, Wilson claims that Amy sets a poor example for the others, introducing them to their licentious reputations and careers:

We were all virtuous girls when Amy, one fine afternoon, left her father's house and sallied forth, like Don Quixote, in quest of adventures. The first person who addressed her was one Mr. Trench; a certain short-sighted, pedantic man, whom most people know about town. I believe she told him that she was running away from her father. All I know for certain is that, when Fanny and I discovered her abode, we went to visit her, and when we asked her what on earth had induced her to throw herself away on an entire stranger whom she had never seen before, her answer was, "I refused him the whole of the first day; had I done so the second he would have been in a fever."

As the sisters grew more sophisticated in their sexual and social prowess, Harriette began to observe how her eldest sister challenged her. Amy was "often surnamed one of the Furies," as Wilson writes. Amy bore the Duke of Argyll's child later in her life. The duke was one of Harriette's former lovers, demonstrating one example of Amy "stealing" her younger sister's clients. Fanny, in contrast, remained a close friend to Wilson and is described as agreeable. The youngest sister, Sophia, married respectably into the aristocracy, becoming the bride of Lord Berwick at age 17.

== Career ==
Wilson began her career at the age of fifteen, becoming the mistress of William Craven, 1st Earl of Craven, 7th Baron Craven. Among her other lovers with whom she had financial arrangements was Arthur Wellesley, 1st Duke of Wellington, who reportedly commented "publish, and be damned" when informed of her plans to write her memoirs. Wilson even attracted George IV's attention, who claimed he would "do anything to suppress what Harriette had to reveal of [his mistress] Lady Conyngham".

Wilson makes a claim in her memoir about Frederick Lamb, 3rd Viscount Melbourne (brother of the future Prime Minister) assaulting her. She attributes his violent act toward her to the jealousy that she had become acquainted with the Duke of Argyll and a lover, a Lord Ponsonby. According to her account, Lamb attacked her because she refused him. Most politicians with whom she had relationships paid high sums to keep their interactions with her private.

Her decision to publish was partly based on the broken promises of her lovers to provide her with an income in her older age. The Memoirs of Harriette Wilson, Written By Herself, first published in 1825, is celebrated for the opening line: "I shall not say how and why I became, at the age of fifteen, the mistress of the Earl of Craven." It was reprinted by the Navarre Society in 1924, as was a follow-up title Paris Lions and London Tigers (1825) with an introduction by Heywood Hill in 1935, although how much of this latter title was the work of Harriette Wilson herself is debatable.

== Legacy ==
Despite modern speculations that Wilson was mistress to the Prince George, Prince of Wales, there is no evidence of such in her memoir. She records a time when, while still serving as a courtesan to Lord Craven, she writes a letter to the Prince of Wales: "I am told that I am very beautiful, so perhaps you would like to see me." She speculates that the response from the prince requesting her visit arrives via Colonel Thomas. Indignant that the prince would request she travel to meet him, she responds:

SIR,— To travel fifty-two miles this bad weather, merely to see a man, with only the given number of legs, arms, fingers, &c., would, you must admit, be madness in a girl like myself, surrounded by humble admirers who are ever ready to travel any distance for the honour of kissing the tip of her little finger; but, if you can prove to me that you are one bit better than any man who may be ready to attend my bidding, I'll e'en start for London directly. So, if you can do anything better in the way of pleasing a lady than ordinary men, write directly: if not, adieu, Monsieur le Prince.

Wilson's clients were politically associated with the Prince of Wales, but in her memoir she does not record meeting or bedding him. However, it is said that "Wilson reminds us that the long-term mistress of the Prince of Wales, having been promised £20,000 which never materialised, died a pauper." Wilson might not have met the man or bedded him, but she was aware that the Prince of Wales, like the many other politicians, did not ultimately financially support their courtesans—and her memoir represents this controversial failing of English officeholders.

== Fictional portrayal ==
- Harriette Wilson appears in the Jane Austen mystery novel, Jane and the Barque of Frailty, by Stephanie Barron. (Harriette and Jane Austen were contemporaries.)
- Harriette Wilson's memoirs Publish and Be Damn'd: The Memoirs of Harriette Wilson was adapted for the BBC Radio 4 series Classic Serial by Ellen Dryden and broadcast in June 2012

== Sources ==
- Wilson, Frances (2003). The Courtesan's Revenge: The Life of Harriette Wilson, the Woman Who Blackmailed the King. London: Faber & Faber ISBN 0-571-20504-6
- Harriette Wilson's Memoirs: The Greatest Courtesan of her Age; selected and edited with an introduction by Lesley Blanch. London: John Murray, 1957. Also published as The Game of Hearts: Harriette Wilson and her Memoirs (edited and introduced by Lesley Blanch), London: Gryphon Books, 1957. Harriette Wilson's Memoirs. Selected and edited with an Introduction by Lesley Blanch. London: The Folio Society, 1964. Harriette Wilson's Memoirs. Selected and edited by Lesley Blanch (introduction: pp. 3–59; The lady and the game; Harriette Wilson's memoirs: pp. 61–442). London: Phoenix Press, 2003.
- Valerie Grosvenor Myer (with an introduction by Sue Limb): Harriette Wilson, Lady of Pleasure. Ely: Fern House, 1999.
- Kenyon-Jones, Christine. "Poetic Licentiousness" The Guardian, 23 August 2003.
