= Sir John Astley, 2nd Baronet =

British landowner and Tory politician

Sir John Astley, 2nd Baronet (baptized 24 January 1687 – 29 December 1771) was a British landowner and Tory politician who sat in the House of Commons for 44 years from 1727 to 1771.

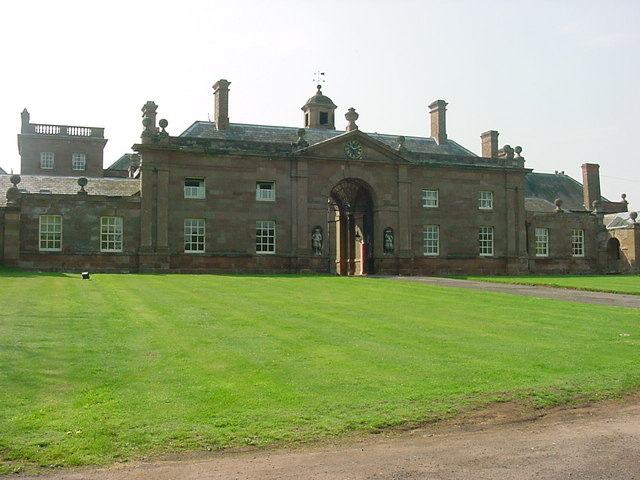
Patshull Hall

The son of Sir Richard Astley, 1st Baronet and Henrietta Borlase, he was baptised in Patshull in Staffordshire on 24 January 1687. Only one year later, he succeeded to his father's baronetcy and estate. In about 1730 he commissioned architect James Gibbs to build Patshull Hall, a substantial Georgian mansion house situated near Pattingham in Staffordshire.

Astley was Member of Parliament (MP) for Shrewsbury from 1727 and 1734 and for Shropshire from 1734 to 1772.

He died in 1771 aged 84. On 27 May 1711, he had married Mary Prynce, daughter of Francis Prynce of Shrewsbury, in Tibberton, Shropshire. They had a son, who predeceased his father, and four daughters. On his death in 1771 aged 84, therefore, the title became extinct. In about 1765 he sold Patshull Hall to George Pigot, 1st Baron Pigot for £100,000.

Parliament of Great Britain
| Preceded by Orlando Bridgeman; Sir Richard Corbet | Member of Parliament for Shrewsbury; 1727–1734; With: Richard Lyster | Succeeded by Sir Richard Corbet; William Kinaston |
| Preceded by John Walcot; William Lacon Childe | Member of Parliament for Shropshire; 1734–1771; With: Corbet Kynaston 1734–1740; Richard Lyster 1740–1766; Charles Baldwyn 1766–1771 | Succeeded by Sir Watkin Williams-Wynn; Charles Baldwyn |
Baronetage of England
| Preceded by Richard Astley | Baronet (of Patshull); 1688–1771 | Extinct |
