= List of mayors of Shrewsbury =

This is a list of notable Mayors of Shrewsbury, the county town of the county of Shropshire, England, since the first recorded mayoralty in 1638. Prior to 1638 the leading citizens of the borough were the two Bailiffs. From 1974 to 2009 the position had the title Mayor of Shrewsbury and Atcham.

== Notable Mayors of Shrewsbury ==
Mayors of Shrewsbury include:

- 1638-39 Thomas Jones (1st Mayor of Shrewsbury)
- 1657-58 Thomas Hunt (MP for Shrewsbury, 1645–53)
- 1685-86 Sir Francis Edwardes, 1st Baronet (MP for Shrewsbury, 1685–89; died on service in Ireland, 1690)
- 1696-97 John Kynaston (High Sheriff of Shropshire, 1689–90; MP for Shrewsbury, 1694–1709)
- 1726-27 John Adams (1677-1752) (father of William Adams (Master of Pembroke))
- 1737-38 Robert More (MP for Shrewsbury, 1754–61)
- 1762-63 Robert Clive (Clive of India; MP for Shrewsbury, 1761–1774)
- 1775-76 William Owen, (Captain (Royal Navy); founder of Campobello colony in New Brunswick, Canada; killed in India, 1778. Possibly Shrewsbury's first disabled Mayor, having lost an arm in 1760.)
- 1777-78 Charlton Leighton (later Sir Charlton, 4th Baronet) (MP for Shrewsbury 1777 and 1780–84)
- 1778-79 Noel Hill, 1st Baron Berwick (MP for Shrewsbury, 1768–74 and for Shropshire, 1774–84)
- 1806-07 Sir Baldwin Leighton, 6th Baronet (General of the British Army)
- 1807-08 Charles Bage (Wine Merchant)
- 1809-10 Joseph Bromfield (Architect)
- 1811-12 Sir John Hill, 3rd Baronet (MP for Shrewsbury, 1784–96 and 1805)
- 1819-20 Rev Hugh Owen (Clergyman and topographer)
- 1822 Rice Wynne
- 1824-25 Rev Richard Hill (later 4th Baron Berwick) (Rector of Berrington, Shropshire)
- 1835 (part year) Robert Burton (Banker, head of Salop Bank)
- 1835-36 William Hazledine (Ironmaster)
- 1836-37 Sir John Bickerton Williams (Nonconformist historian and first knight made by Queen Victoria)
- 1842-43 Edward Haycock (Architect)
- 1843-44 Robert Burton
- 1861-62 William James Clement (Surgeon and MP for Shrewsbury, 1865–70)
- 1872-73 Samuel Pountney Smith (Architect)
- 1886-87 George Butler Lloyd (Banker, MP for Shrewsbury, 1913–22)
- 1887 Vincent Crump Confectioner
- 1888 Major General The Hon. William Henry Herbert (son of Edward Herbert, 2nd Earl of Powis Gentleman
- 1889 George Jones Holt Wine Merchant
- 1890 Edmund Cresswell Peele Solicitor
- 1891 George Evans Gentleman - Retired Businessman - plumber
- 1892 William Lyon Browne Gentleman
- 1893 William Gowen Cross Chemist
- 1894 William Maynard How Solicitor
- 1895 Edmund Cresswell Peele Solicitor
- 1896 Edward Corbett Army Officer
- 1897 Thomas Pidduck Deakin, Hotel Proprietor
- 1898 Richard Scoltock Hughes, Shoemaker
- 1899-1900 Richard Scoltock Hughes, Shoemaker
- 1900-02 Samuel Meeson Morris Solicitor (two terms?)
- 1902-03 Herbert Robert Henry Southam, Brewer (Conservative)
- 1903-04 William Francis Watkins, Tailor
- 1904-05 Henry John Hearn, Brewer
- 1905-06 Richard Edward Jones, Maltster

== 21st century ==
- 2000 Reginald Jones (Retired bus driver, lifelong Shrewsbury resident)
- 2000–2001 John Peter Jones (Head Teacher (Special Education))
- 2001–2002 Charles Forshaw (Retired)
- 2002–2003 George Henry Mills Richey (Lt Col Retired)
- 2003–2004 Eileen Dorothy Sandford (Retired)
- 2004–2005 Miles Kenny (Property Manager)
- 2005–2006 David Farmer
- 2006–2007 Roger Evans (Retired)
- 2007–2008 John Cooke (Farmer)
- 2008–2009 Anne Chebsey (Biomedical Scientist)
- 2009–2010 Alan Townsend (Retired Teacher)
- 2010–2011 Kathleen Owen
- 2011–2012 Tony Durnell (Shropshire & Shrewsbury Town Councillor)
- 2012–2013 Keith Roberts (Retired Police Officer)
- 2013–2014 Jon Tandy (Former Post Office Worker)
- 2014–2015 Beverley Baker (Costume and accessory designer)
- 2015–2016 Miles Kenny
- 2016–2017 Ioan Jones
- 2017–2018 Jane Mackenzie
- 2018–2019 Peter Nutting
- 2019–2020 Phil Gillam
- 2020–2021 Gwen Burgess
- 2021–2022 Julian Dean
- 2022–2023 Elisabeth Roberts
- 2023–2024 Becky Wall
- 2024–2025 David Vasmer
- 2025–2026 Alex Wagner
