= Noel Hill, 1st Baron Berwick =

British politician and landowner

The Right Honourable The Lord Berwick

Member of Parliament for Shropshire
- In office 1774–1784
- Preceded by: Sir Watkin Williams-Wynn; Charles Baldwyn
- Succeeded by: John Kynaston; Sir Richard Hill

Member of Parliament for Shrewsbury
- In office 1768–1774
- Preceded by: Thomas Hill; Robert Clive
- Succeeded by: Charlton Leighton; Robert Clive

Personal details
- Born: Noel Hill; 16 April 1745 St James's, London
- Died: 6 January 1789 (aged 43) Marylebone, London
- Party: Whig
- Spouse: Anna Vernon (after 1768)
- Children: 6
- Parent(s): Thomas Hill; Susanna Maria Noel
- Education: St John's College, Cambridge

Noel Hill, 1st Baron Berwick (16 April 1745 – 6 January 1789), was an English landowner and politician who sat in the House of Commons from 1768 to 1784 when he was raised to the peerage.

== Early life ==
Hill was the youngest and only surviving son of Thomas Hill, and his wife Susanna Maria Noel. He was born at his father's London home, 3 Cleveland Court, St James's.

Venn describes his schooling as private and he is known to have been tutored by future preacher John William Fletcher. He entered St John's College, Cambridge, where he graduated with a Bachelor of Arts (B.A.) in 1763, and a Master of Arts (M.A.) in 1766. He also studied law, being admitted to the Inner Temple in 1765, without qualifying as barrister.

== Career ==
Hill sat as Whig Member of Parliament for Shrewsbury between 1768 and 1774 and for Shropshire between 1774 and 1784. On 19 May 1784 he was raised to the Peerage of Great Britain as Baron Berwick, of Attingham in the County of Shropshire.

He also served as Mayor of Shrewsbury in 1778–79 and of Oswestry in 1779–80.

== Personal life ==
On 17 November 1768, Berwick was married to Anna Vernon at St George's Hanover Square Church in London. Anna was the second daughter of Henry Vernon and the former Lady Henrietta Wentworth (the third daughter of Thomas Wentworth, 1st Earl of Strafford). They had three sons and three daughters, including:

- Thomas Noel Hill, 2nd Baron Berwick (1770–1832), who married Sophia Dubochet, daughter of Swiss clock-maker John James Dubochet, in 1812.
- William Noel-Hill, 3rd Baron Berwick (1773–1842), an MP who died unmarried.
- Richard Noel-Hill, 4th Baron Berwick (1774–1848), who married Frances Maria Owen, second daughter of William Mostyn Owen, MP for Montgomeryshire.
- Hon. Henrietta Maria Hill (d. 1831), who married Charles Brudenell-Bruce, 1st Marquess of Ailesbury in 1793.
- Hon. Anna Matilda Hill (d. 1837)
- Hon. Amelia Louisa Hill (d. 1850)

Lord Berwick died on 6 January 1789, aged 43, at Portman Square, Marylebone, London, He was buried on 20 January 1789 at Atcham, Shropshire, England. All of his sons succeeded each other in his peerage.

=== Descendants ===
Through his daughter Henrietta, he was a grandfather of Lady Maria Carolina Ann Brudenell-Bruce (wife of the Count de Montreville), Lady Augusta Frederica Brudenell-Bruce (wife of Frederick Wentworth), George Brudenell-Bruce, 2nd Marquess of Ailesbury, Lady Elizabeth Brudenell-Bruce (wife of H.E. Lensgreve Christian Danneskiold-Samsøe), and Ernest Brudenell-Bruce, 3rd Marquess of Ailesbury.

== Coat of arms ==
Coat of arms of Noel Hill, 1st Baron Berwick
Notes Coat of arms of Baron Berwick Coronet A coronet of a Baron Crest 1st: A Stag statant Argent (Hill); 2nd: On the Battlements of a Tower a Hind statant Argent collared and chained Or (Noel); 3rd: A Stag's Head caboshed Sable in the mouth a Sprig of Oak proper (Harwood) Escutcheon Quarterly, 1st and 4th, Ermine on a Fess Sable a Castle with two Towers Argent on a Canton Gules a Martlet Or (Hill); 2nd, Or fretty Gules a Canton Ermine (Noel); 4th, Or a Chevron between three Stags' Heads caboshed Gules (Harwood Supporters Dexter: A Pegasus Argent gorged with a Plain Collar Sable thereon a Martlet Or; Sinister: A Stag Argent attired Or gorged with a Plain Collar Sable thereon a Leopard's Face Gold and a chain reflexed over the back also Gold Motto Qui uti scit ei bona

Parliament of Great Britain
Preceded by Thomas Hill; Robert Clive	Member of Parliament for Shrewsbury; 1768–1774; With: Robert Clive	Succeeded by Charlton Leighton; Robert Clive
Preceded by Sir Watkin Williams-Wynn; Charles Baldwyn	Member of Parliament for Shropshire; 1774–1784; With: Charles Baldwyn; Sir Richard Hill	Succeeded by John Kynaston; Sir Richard Hill
Peerage of Great Britain
New creation	Baron Berwick; 1784–1789	Succeeded by Thomas Noel Hill
