= Sir Orlando Bridgeman, 4th Baronet =

British politician (1695–1764)

Sir Orlando Bridgeman
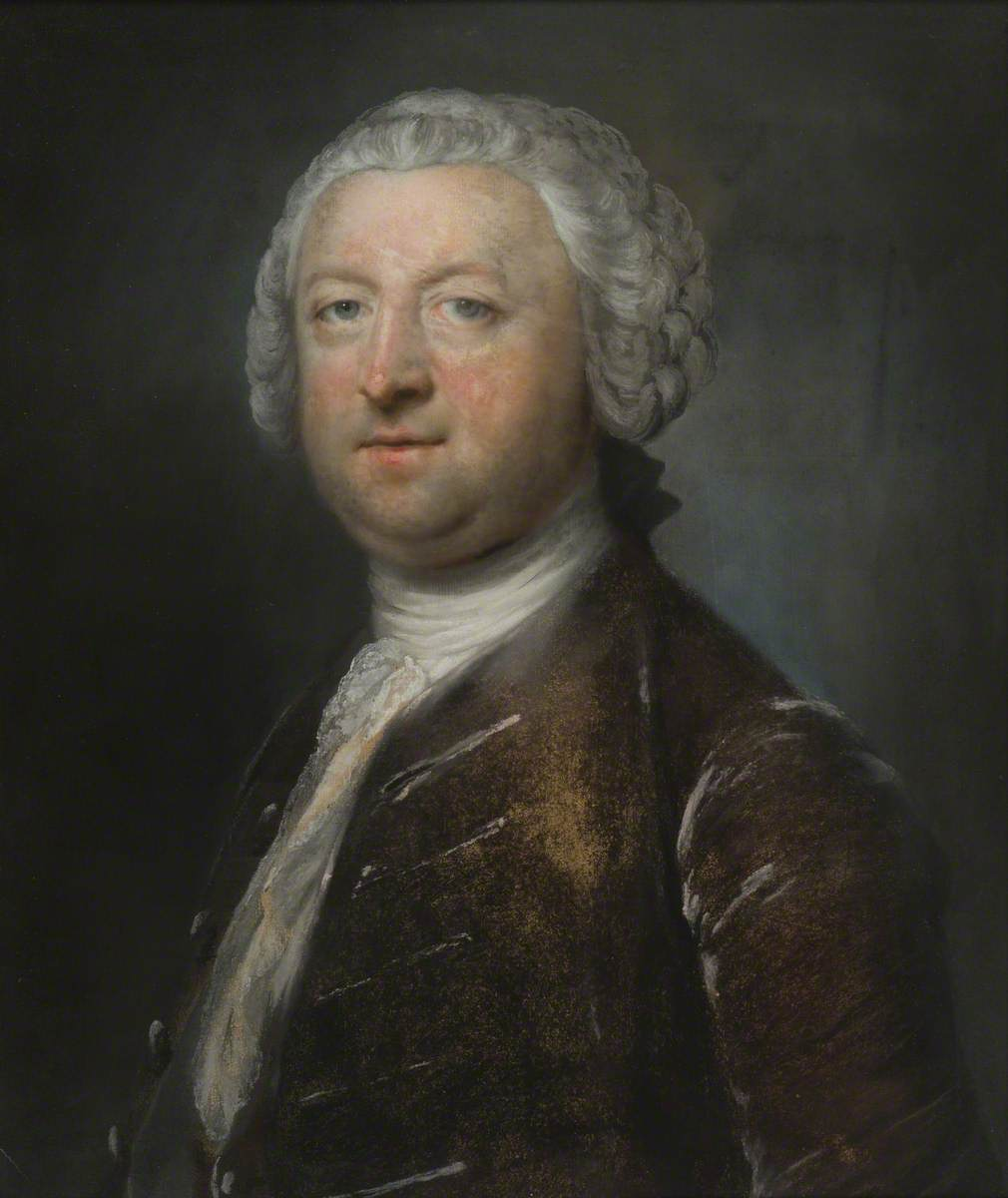
- Portrait by Francis Cotes, 1761

Member of Parliament for Shrewsbury
- In office 1723–1727 Serving with Sir Richard Corbet
- Preceded by: Corbet Kynaston; Richard Lyster
- Succeeded by: Richard Lyster; Sir John Astley

Personal details
- Born: 2 July 1695 Blodwell, Shropshire
- Died: 25 July 1764 (aged 69)
- Resting place: Weston Park, Staffordshire
- Spouse: Anne Newport
- Children: Henry Bridgeman, 1st Baron Bradford
- Parent(s): Sir John Bridgeman; Ursula Matthews

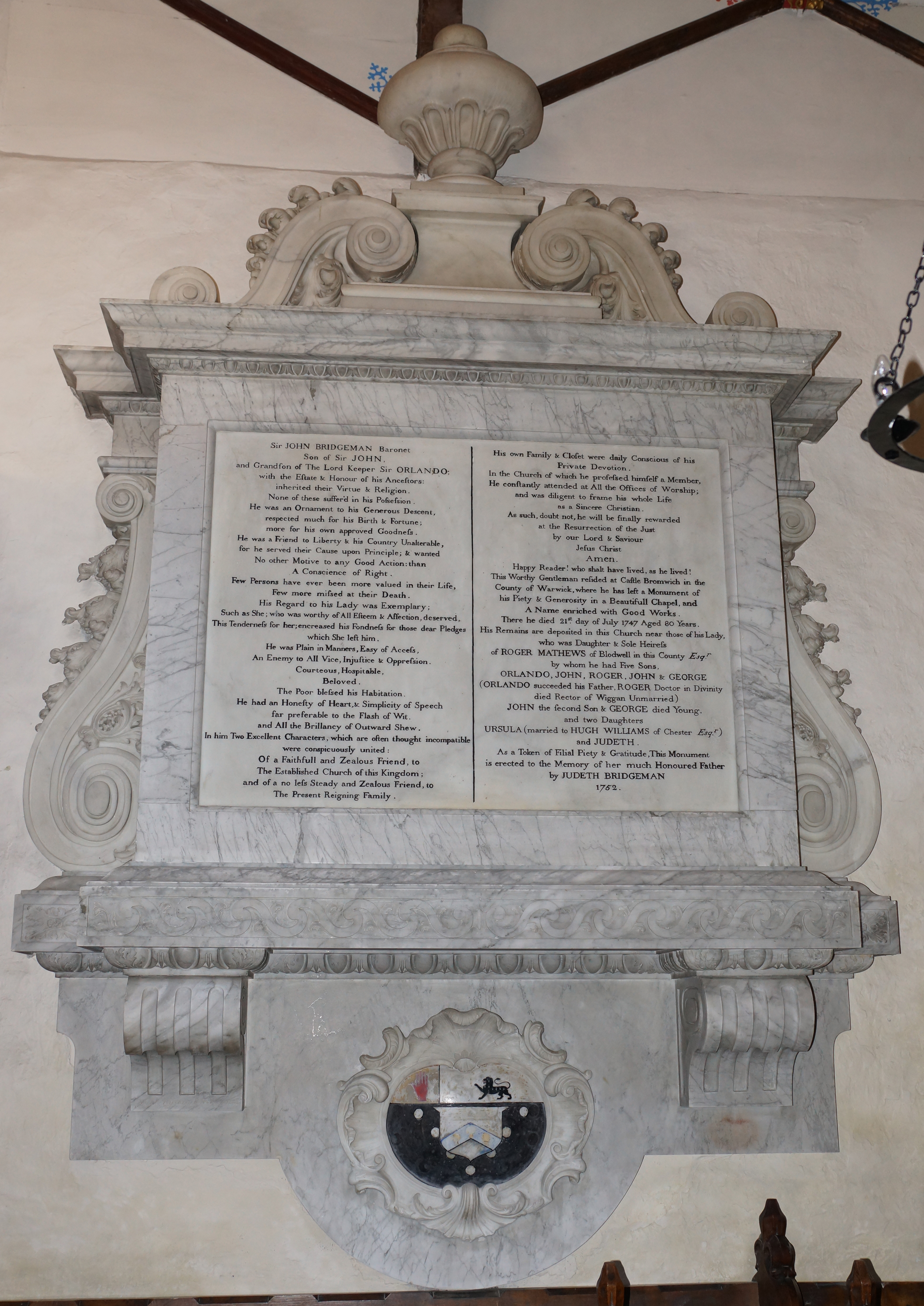
Mentioned on the monument in St Michael the Archangel, Llanyblodwel to his father, John Bridgeman

Sir Orlando Bridgeman, 4th Baronet (2 July 1695 – 25 July 1764) was a British baronet and politician.

== Life ==
Born in Blodwell in Shropshire, he was the oldest son of Sir John Bridgeman, 3rd Baronet and his wife Ursula, daughter of Roger Matthews. Bridgeman was educated at New College, Oxford and in 1713, he was called to the bar by the Inner Temple. In 1723, he entered the British House of Commons, sitting for Shrewsbury in the next four years. He succeeded his father as baronet on the latter's death in 1747.

== Family ==
On 8 April 1719, Bridgeman married Anne Newport, third daughter of Richard Newport, 2nd Earl of Bradford. They had three sons and two daughters. His wife died in 1752 and Bridgeman survived her until 1764, aged 69; both were buried at Weston Park in the county of Staffordshire. His oldest son having predeceased him, he was succeeded in the baronetcy by his second son Henry, who later was raised to the peerage as Baron Bradford.

Parliament of Great Britain
Preceded by Richard Lyster; Corbet Kynaston	Member of Parliament for Shrewsbury; 1723–1727; With: Sir Richard Corbet	Succeeded by Richard Lyster; Sir John Astley
Baronetage of England
Preceded by John Bridgeman	Baronet (of Great Lever); 1747–1764	Succeeded by Henry Bridgeman
