= Baron Hume of Berwick =

Barony in the Peerage of Great Britain

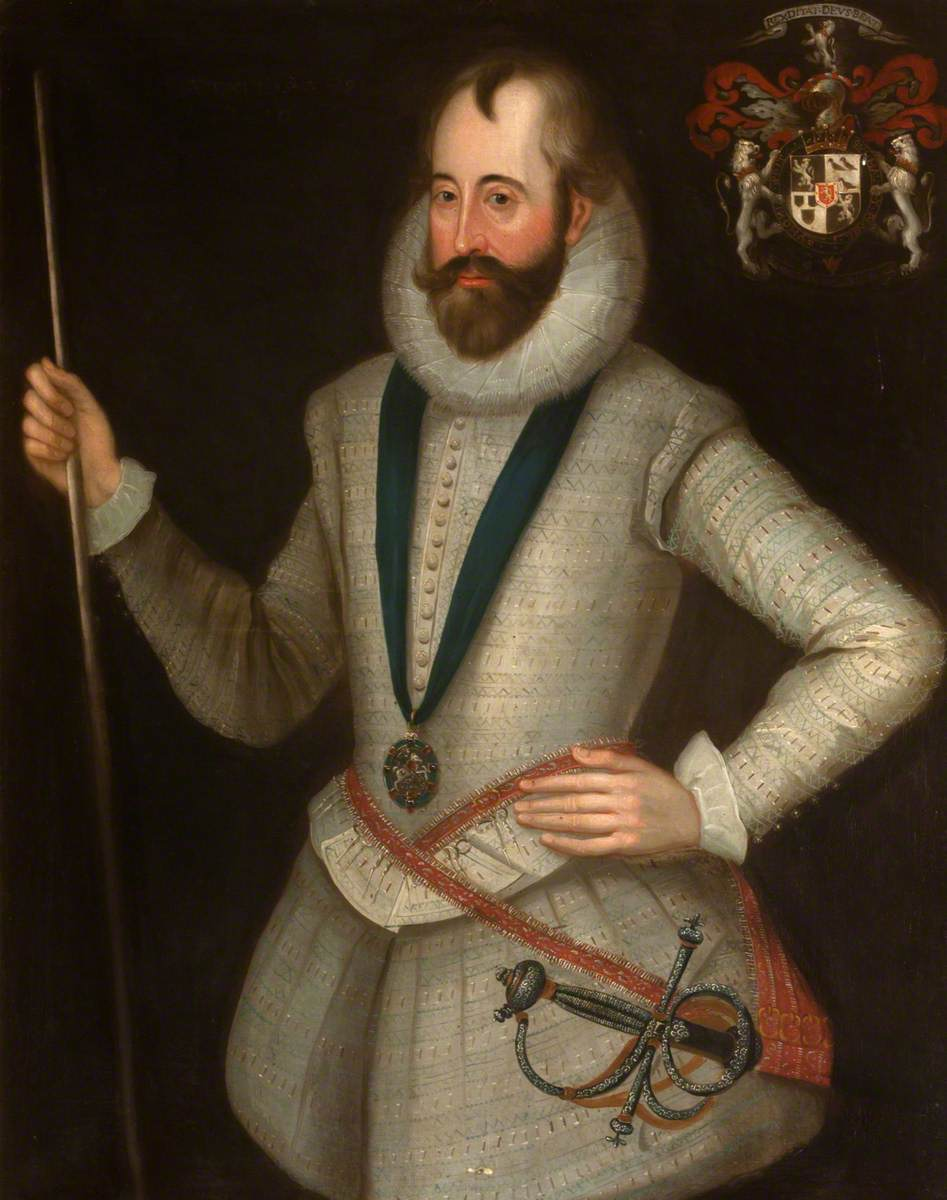
Inaugural titleholder George Home, 1st Earl of Dunbar, painted in 1610

Baron Hume of Berwick was a title which has been created twice. The first creation was in either the Peerage of England or the Peerage of Scotland. The second creation was in the Peerage of Great Britain.

== First creation ==
The title was first created as Baron Hume of Berwick on 7 July 1604, for George Home, Lord Treasurer of Scotland, member of the English Privy Council, and Keeper of the Great Wardrobe. (In 1605 he was further created Earl of Dunbar). Some sources say that it was created in the Peerage of England. The second edition of the Complete Peerage, however, states that "In vol iv [of the first edition of that work], sub DUNBAR, this was regarded as an English creation, following Crawfurd, who treats it as such on the authority of Dugdale. On further consideration, however, the Editors have come to the conclusion that the clause in the patent enabling the grantee to nominate a kinsman to succeed him in the dignity marks it as a Scottish creation, for such a power of nomination is unknown to the English Peerage." and that "He d. s.p.m. Jan 1610/11, since which time his honours have remained dormant.

Most sources cite the title as being extinct. However, the 2003 edition of Debretts gives an opposing view when it states: "The Lordship of Home (or Hume) of Berwick, cr by patent 1604 upon George Home... with remainder to his heirs for ever, is held to have descended to the Earls of Home through lady Anna Home".

This "Lady Anna Home" was the daughter of George Home, 1st Earl of Dunbar and the mother of James Home, 3rd Earl of Home.

The question of the continued existence of the title came to the fore again in 1963 when the Prime Minister, Alec Douglas-Home, 14th Earl of Home, was required to renounce all of his peerages under the new Peerage Act 1963, in order to sit in the House of Commons. Douglas-Home signed the historic 'Instrument of Disclaimer' on 23 October 1963, in which this peerage was inserted, along with all of his other peerages. Upon his death in 1995, his son, David Douglas-Home, 15th Earl of Home, resumed his father's disclaimed titles. It is said that he maintains a claim to the title of Lord Hume of Berwick, but no such claim has as yet been placed before the Crown.

Debretts also state this peerage is more likely to belong to the Peerage of Scotland given its unusual remainder. To circumvent this uncertainty with relation to Douglas-Home's disclaimer, the Lord Chancellor's office listed both "The Lordship of Hume of Berwick in the peerage of Scotland" and "The Barony of Hume in the Peerage of England" in the instrument of disclaimer, an obvious anomaly.

== Second creation ==
On 14 May 1776, Alexander Hume-Campbell, Lord Polwarth, son and heir of Hugh Hume-Campbell, 3rd Earl of Marchmont, was created Baron Hume of Berwick, in the Peerage of Great Britain, but the title became extinct when he died without issue.

== See also ==
- Baron Berwick
- Tony Lloyd, Baron Lloyd of Berwick
