= Robert Watkin Wynne =

Welsh politician

Robert Watkin Wynne (c. 1754 – 2 March 1806), of Garthmeilo, Merionethshire and Plas Newydd, Denbighshire, was a Welsh politician.

He was the only surviving son of Robert Wynne of Garthmeilio and Plas Newydd and educated at Westminster School (1767–71) and Jesus College, Oxford (1773). He succeeded his father in 1782 and was appointed High Sheriff of Merionethshire for 1798–1799.

He was a Member (MP) of the Parliament of Great Britain for Denbighshire from 28 August 1789 to 1796.

He married Anne Sobieski, the daughter of Thomas Dod of Edge, Cheshire; they had one son.

Parliament of Great Britain
Preceded by Sir Watkin Williams-Wynn, 4th Bt	Member of Parliament for Denbighshire; 1789–1796	Succeeded by Sir Watkin Williams-Wynn, 5th Bt
