= John Walcot =

British Tory politician

Walcot's Estate Act 1741
- Act of Parliament
- Parliament of Great Britain
- Long title: An Act for vesting Part of the Marriage Portion of Mary late Wife of John Walcot Esquire, and also Part of his settled Estate, in Trustees, for raising Money, to pay Debts; and for securing an Equivalent for the same, for the Benefit of his Heir Male.
- Citation: 15 Geo. 2. c. 31 Pr.
- Territorial extent: Great Britain

Dates
- Royal assent: 16 June 1742
- Commencement: 1 December 1741 (Note: Start of session.)

Status: Current legislation

John Walcot (1697–1765), of Walcot, Shropshire, was a British Tory politician who sat in the House of Commons from 1727 to 1734.

Walcot was baptised on 24 June 1697, the eldest son of Charles Walcot of Walcot and his second wife Anne Brydges, daughter of James Brydges, 8th Baron Chandos of Sudeley. He matriculated at Magdalen College, Oxford on 16 July 1715, aged 16, and was created MA on 6 March 1720. In 1726 he succeeded to his father's estate at Walcot. He married Mary Dashwood, daughter. of Sir Francis Dashwood, 1st Baronet MP of West Wycombe, Buckinghamshire, on 15 May 1732.

In 1727 Walcot purchased the manor of Bishop's Castle from his uncle, the Duke of Chandos, for £7,000, and so acquired the chief electoral interest there. He had an income of £3,000 a year, but was burdened with a debt of £22,000 and was advised by his uncle not to stand for Shropshire until he had paid off the debt.

Ignoring Chandos's advice, Walcot was returned as a Tory Member of Parliament for Shropshire at the 1727 British general election. He voted against the government. Although he did not stand again at the 1734 British general election, he continued to support his interest at Bishop's Castle, which put him further into debt. By 1742 he owed over £33,000 and had to obtain a private act of Parliament, Walcot's Estate Act 1741 (15 Geo. 2. c. 31 Pr.), to raise money on his wife's portion. Before the 1747 British general election he borrowed £8,500 from his banker, Samuel Child, who was standing for Bishop's Castle. By 1761, his debts had risen to over £48,000. He was forced to hide from his creditors, leaving his son and lawyer to sell his property Walcot Hall to Lord Clive for £92,000.

Walcot died in 1765 leaving two sons.

== Notes ==
Parliament of Great Britain
Preceded by John Kynaston; Robert Lloyd	Member of Parliament for Shropshire; 1727–1734; With: William Lacon Childe	Succeeded by Sir John Astley; Corbet Kynaston
