= Corbet Kynaston =

English politician (1690–1740)

Corbet Kynaston (28 January 1690 – 17 June 1740), of Hordley, Shropshire, was an English Tory politician who sat in the House of Commons between 1714 and 1740. His Jacobite sympathies resulted in his fleeing abroad to avoid arrest.

== Early life ==
Kynaston was the eldest son of John Kynaston and his first wife Beatrice Corbet (died 1703), daughter of Sir Vincent Corbet, 2nd Baronet, of Moreton Corbet, Shropshire. He was admitted at Inner Temple in 1720.

In 1710, Kynaston was one of the leading figures in the procession that accompanied Dr Sacheverell into Shrewsbury. At about the same time he inherited, through his mother, various estates in Shropshire.

== Political career ==
At the 1713 British general election he stood for Shrewsbury, with the support of his father, who headed a strong Tory interest in the borough. He lost the poll in a close contest but petitioned and on 14 March 1714 he was returned as Tory Member of Parliament for Shrewsbury. He is not recorded as having spoken in this Parliament, and was not an active participant.

Kynaston was returned unopposed as MP for Shrewsbury at the 1715 British general election. In September 1715 he was one of six MPs ordered to be arrested on a charge of having been involved in a plot related to a Jacobite invasion attempt. He left the country, leaving 12 pictures of the Duke of Ormonde at his country home, after distributing numerous them ‘to spirit up the mob to revenge their idol.’ He eventually surrendered himself on 9 January 1716, and was released soon afterwards. He was a consistent opponent of the Whig administration, voting against them in all recorded divisions, and still took part in Jacobite intrigues. He was re-elected at the 1722 British general election but was unseated on petition on 9 April 1723. He stood for Shrewsbury again in 1727 when he was defeated by Sir John Astley, a fellow Tory who had been awarded £24,000 damages against him in a lawsuit over transactions in South Sea stock. He went to France to avoid paying, and remained there until his father's death in 1733, when he came to terms with Astley. He was returned with Astley as MP for Shropshire in 1734, and continued voting against the Government. He was mayor of Oswestry in 1739, dying in office.

== Death and legacy ==
Kynaston died unmarried on 17 June 1740, aged 50, at Shelvock, Ruyton-XI-Towns, Shropshire, and was buried on 21 June at Moreton Corbet. His estates went to his half-brother Edward Kynaston. Corbet left debts of between £70,000 and £80000,000, suits from his creditors leading to an act of Parliament, the Corbet Kynaston's Estate Act 1747 (21 Geo. 2. c. 22 Pr., being passed to enable his estates to be sold. His Shrewsbury town mansion, Broom Hall, was acquired for conversion into the Salop Infirmary hospital founded in 1745.

Parliament of Great Britain
Preceded by Edward Cressett; Thomas Jones	Member of Parliament for Shrewsbury; 1714–1723; With: Edward Cressett 1714-1715; Thomas Jones1715; Andrew Corbet 1715-1722; Richard Lyster 1722-1723	Succeeded by Sir Richard Corbet; Orlando Bridgeman
Preceded by John Walcot; William Lacon Childe	Member of Parliament for Shropshire; 1734–1740; With: Sir John Astley	Succeeded by Sir John Astley; Richard Lyster
