= Sir Richard Corbet, 4th Baronet =

Sir Richard Corbet, 4th Baronet (1696–1774), of Longnor, Shropshire, was a British Whig politician who sat in the House of Commons for 24 years between 1723 and 1754.

Photograph of Longnor Hall from 1891.

Corbet was baptised on 21 May 1696, the eldest son of Sir Uvedale Corbet, 3rd Baronet, of Longnor, Shropshire, and his wife Lady Mildred Cecil, daughter of James Cecil, 3rd Earl of Salisbury. He was the grandson of Sir Richard Corbet, MP for Shrewsbury from 1678 to 1681. His father died on 15 October 1701 and he succeeded to the estates and baronetcy. His mother subsequently married Sir Charles Hotham, 4th Baronet. Corbet matriculated at New College, Oxford on 30 June 1713 aged 17. He lived mainly at Shrewsbury, and took an active interest in the business of the corporation.

Corbet's father had founded a Whig club at Shrewsbury in 1684, and Corbet followed in the Whig tradition. He stood for Parliament at Shrewsbury at the 1722 general election, and after a defeat in the poll, he was returned on petition as Whig Member of Parliament on 9 April 1723. He did not stand in 1727 but was elected after a close contest in 1734. He always voted for the Government. He was returned unopposed at the 1741 general election but faced another hard fought election in 1747, after which he decided not to seek re-election in 1754. He told Lord Powis of his decision, and asked him to consider maintaining the Whig interest.

Corbet died unmarried on 25 September 1774 and the baronetcy became extinct.

Parliament of Great Britain
Preceded by Richard Lyster; Corbet Kynaston	Member of Parliament for Shrewsbury; 1723–1727; With: Orlando Bridgeman	Succeeded by Richard Lyster; Sir John Astley
Preceded by Richard Lyster; Sir John Astley	Member of Parliament for Shrewsbury; 1734–1754; With: William Kinaston 1734-1749; Thomas Hill 1749-1754	Succeeded by Thomas Hill; Robert More
Baronetage of England
Preceded by Uvedale Corbet	Baronet (of Leighton); 1701-1774	Extinct
