= Thomas Noel Hill, 2nd Baron Berwick =

British peer and art patron (1770–1832)

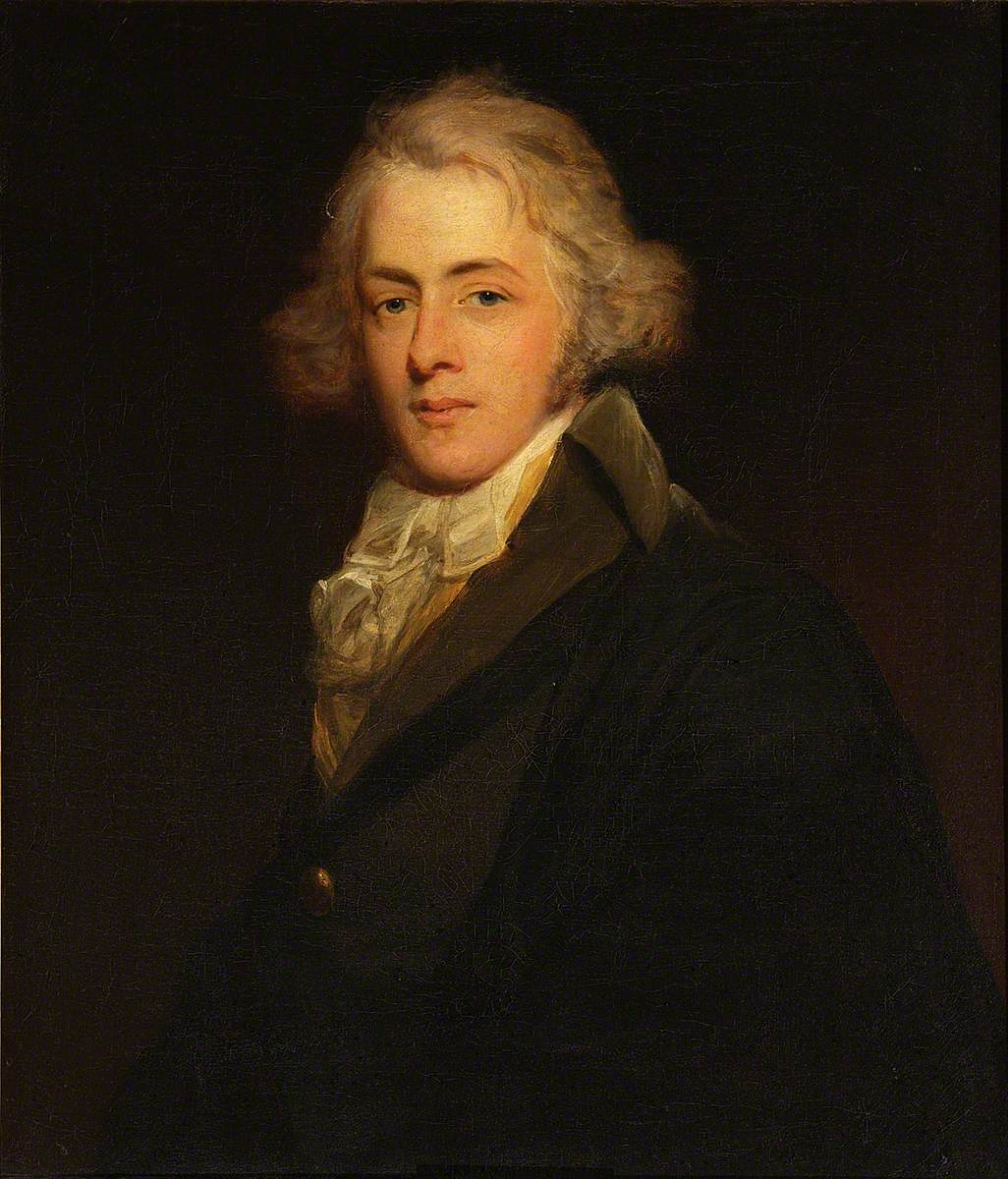
Thomas Noel-Hill (1770–1832), 2nd Baron Berwick of Attingham by George Romney. National Trust, Attingham Park

Thomas Noel Hill, 2nd Baron Berwick of Attingham, FSA (21 October 1770 – 3 November 1832), was a British peer and art patron.

The first son of Noel Hill, who was created Baron Berwick in 1784, and his wife Anna Vernon, he was educated at Jesus College, Cambridge, where he was in the same year as Edward Daniel Clarke, and graduated as M.A. in 1791. In 1792–94, he paid Clarke's expenses as a traveling companion to Germany, Switzerland and Italy; he employed Angelica Kauffman in painting. In 1801 Thomas Noel Hill became a Fellow, Society of Antiquaries (F.S.A.). On 8 February 1812 he married Sophia Dubochet, daughter of John James Dubochet, at St Marylebone Church, London. (Sophia and her famous sister Harriette Wilson were highly fashionable courtesans.) In 1827 and 1829 they were forced to hold bankruptcy auctions to pay off debts. At this point Thomas's younger brother William came to the rescue and purchased much of the furniture and then leased their home, Attingham Park. Thomas and Sophia escaped to Italy, where Thomas died childless at age 62 in Naples; upon his death his brother William Noel-Hill inherited the title.

== Coat of arms ==
Coat of arms of Thomas Noel Hill, 2nd Baron Berwick
Notes Coat of arms of Baron Berwick Coronet A coronet of a Baron Crest 1st: A Stag statant Argent (Hill); 2nd: On the Battlements of a Tower a Hind statant Argent collared and chained Or (Noel); 3rd: A Stag's Head caboshed Sable in the mouth a Sprig of Oak proper (Harwood) Escutcheon Quarterly, 1st and 4th, Ermine on a Fess Sable a Castle with two Towers Argent on a Canton Gules a Martlet Or (Hill); 2nd, Or fretty Gules a Canton Ermine (Noel); 4th, Or a Chevron between three Stags' Heads caboshed Gules (Harwood Supporters Dexter: A Pegasus Argent gorged with a Plain Collar Sable thereon a Martlet Or; Sinister: A Stag Argent attired Or gorged with a Plain Collar Sable thereon a Leopard's Face Gold and a chain reflexed over the back also Gold Motto Qui uti scit ei bona - English translation He who knows how to make use of the goods to him,

Peerage of Great Britain
Preceded by Noel Hill	Baron Berwick; 1789–1832	Succeeded by William Noel-Hill
