= Richard Lyster (Shropshire) =

British landowner and politician (c.1691–1766)

Richard Lyster (c. 1691 – 13 April 1766) of Rowton Castle, Shropshire, was a British landowner and Tory politician who sat in the House of Commons for 34 years between 1722 and 1766

Lyster was the eldest son of Thomas Lyster of Rowton Castle and his wife Elizabeth Beaw, daughter of Dr. William Beaw, Bishop of Llandaff. In 1702, he succeeded his father to Rowton. He was educated at Shrewsbury School, and matriculated at Christ Church, Oxford on 3 July 1708, aged 16, and entered Inner Temple in 1708. He married Anne Pigot, daughter of Robert Pigot of Chetwynd, Shropshire.

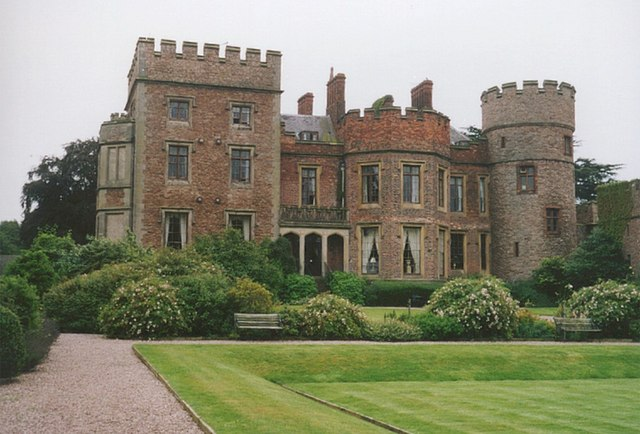
Rowton Castle

Lyster was descended from Sir Thomas Lyster, supporter of King Charles I, and was a strong Tory and supposed Jacobite. He was elected Member of Parliament for Shrewsbury at the 1722 general election by a large majority. When he was unseated on a party vote on 9 April 1723, he marched out of the House with his back to the Speaker and was called to order for a discourtesy to the House. In response, he said: ‘When you learn justice, I will learn manners’, and when it was proposed to bring him to the bar of the House, Prime Minister Robert Walpole said ‘Let him go, he has been hardly enough used’. He was elected MP for Shrewsbury at the 1727 general election. He was the only Member to vote against a motion for a grant to the Princess Royal on her marriage in 1733, and was defeated at the 1734 general election. He was returned unopposed as MP for Shropshire at a by-election on 11 December 1740 and was returned unopposed again at the general elections in 1741 and 1747. All known votes by him before 1754 were against the Government.

From 1753 onwards, Lyster abided by a compromise by which the Tory country gentlemen chose the Shropshire representation, and Lord Powis's friends chose for Shrewsbury. He was returned unopposed for Shropshire at the elections of 1754 and 1761. In September 1762, the Duke of Newcastle classed him as ‘contra’. In 1765 he had not yet taken his seat in that Parliament, and there was no record of his having spoken or voted in it.

Lyster died on 13 April 1766, aged 75. He had two sons and two daughters who all predeceased him.

Parliament of Great Britain
Preceded by Andrew Corbet; Corbet Kynaston	Member of Parliament for Shrewsbury; 1722–1723; With: Corbet Kynaston	Succeeded by Sir Richard Corbet; Orlando Bridgeman
Preceded by Sir Richard Corbet; Orlando Bridgeman	Member of Parliament for Shrewsbury; 1727–1734; With: Sir John Astley	Succeeded by William Kinaston; Sir Richard Corbet
Preceded by Sir John Astley; Corbet Kynaston	Member of Parliament for Shropshire; 1740–1766; With: Sir John Astley	Succeeded by Sir John Astley; Charles Baldwyn
