= Richard Noel-Hill, 4th Baron Berwick =

Richard Noel-Hill, 4th Baron Berwick of Attingham (7 November 1774 – 28 September 1848), was born in the parish of St. Martin-in-the-Fields, Covent Garden, London, England, and baptised there on 11 November.

He was the son of Noel Hill of Attingham, who was created Baron Berwick in 1784, and Anna Vernon. He married Frances Maria Mostyn-Owen, daughter of William Mostyn Owen and Rebecca Dod, on 16 January 1800 at St. Chad's, Shrewsbury.

Richard Noel-Hill, 4th Baron Berwick of Attingham, was baptised with the name of Richard Hill. He was educated in 1787 at Rugby School and graduated from St John's College, Cambridge, in 1795 with a Master of Arts (M.A.). He was ordained deacon (1797) and then priest in the Church of England in 1798. He was Rector from 1799 of both Berrington, Shropshire (to 1845), and of Thornton-in-the-Moors, Cheshire (to 1846). He was Mayor of Shrewsbury in 1824. On 19 March 1824, his name was legally changed to Richard Noel-Hill by Royal Licence. He succeeded to the title of 4th Baron Berwick of Attingham on 4 August 1842.

In 1847 he served as treasurer of the Salop Infirmary in Shrewsbury.

He died on 28 September 1848, aged 73, at Attingham, and was buried at the parish church of Atcham, Shropshire, on 6 October.

== Coat of arms ==
Coat of arms of Richard Noel-Hill, 4th Baron Berwick
Notes Coat of arms of Baron Berwick family Coronet A coronet of a Baron Crest 1st: A Stag statant Argent (Hill); 2nd: On the Battlements of a Tower a Hind statant Argent collared and chained Or (Noel); 3rd: A Stag's Head caboshed Sable in the mouth a Sprig of Oak proper (Harwood) Escutcheon Quarterly, 1st and 4th, Ermine on a Fess Sable a Castle with two Towers Argent on a Canton Gules a Martlet Or (Hill); 2nd, Or fretty Gules a Canton Ermine (Noel); 4th, Or a Chevron between three Stags' Heads caboshed Gules (Harwood Supporters Dexter: A Pegasus Argent gorged with a Plain Collar Sable thereon a Martlet Or; Sinister: A Stag Argent attired Or gorged with a Plain Collar Sable thereon a Leopard's Face Gold and a chain reflexed over the back also Gold Motto Qui uti scit ei bona

Peerage of Great Britain
Preceded by William Noel Hill	Baron Berwick; 1842–1848	Succeeded by Richard Noel Noel-Hill
