= William Lacon Childe =

British Tory politician

William Lacon Childe (3 March 1700 – 14 December 1757) of the Birch, Kinlet, Shropshire was a British Tory politician who sat in the House of Commons from 1727 to 1734

Childe was the eldest son of Thomas Childe of the Birch, Kinlet and his wife Sarah Acton, daughter of Sir Edward Acton Bt MP of Aldenham, Shropshire. In 1708, he succeeded his father. He matriculated at Christ Church, Oxford on 25 May 1715. In 1720, he succeeded his uncle, Sir Lacon William Childe, at Kinlet, Shropshire. He married Catherine Pytts, daughter of Samuel Pytts MP of Kyre, Worcestershire.

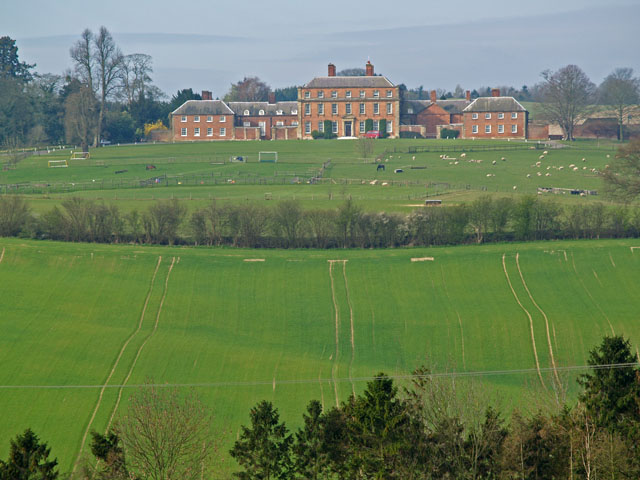
Kinlet Hall

Childe was returned unopposed as Tory Member of Parliament for Shropshire at the 1727 British general election. He voted consistently with the Opposition and was one of a group of Shropshire MP who brought in a bill to prevent irregularity in the delivery of election writs. He replaced the old manor house at Kinlet by Kinlet Hall between 1727 and 1729, commissioning the architect Francis Smith of Warwick to create the present Palladian style mansion. He did not stand at the 1734 British general election but contested Bridgnorth at the 1741 British general election where he was defeated. He did not stand again.

Childe died on 14 December 1757 aged 57 leaving three daughters.

Parliament of Great Britain
| Preceded by John Kynaston; Robert Lloyd | Member of Parliament for Shropshire; 1727–1734; With: John Walcot | Succeeded by Sir John Astley; Corbet Kynaston |
