= Noel Hill (Antarctica) =

Hill in the South Shetland Islands

Coordinates: 62°13′14″S 58°43′53″W

Noel Hill is a conspicuous slate knob, 255 m high, on the Barton Peninsula in the west part of King George Island, South Shetland Islands. The name was used by Scottish geologist David Ferguson in a 1921 report based upon his investigations of King George Island in 1913–14.
