= William Noel-Hill, 3rd Baron Berwick =

British politician and diplomatist

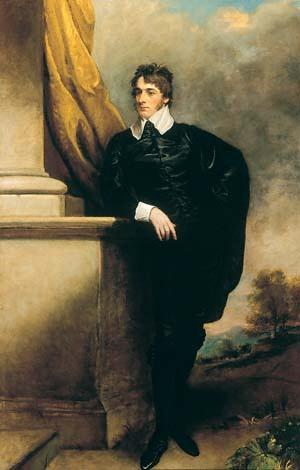
William Noel-Hill, 3rd Baron Berwick, attributed to Richard Cosway

William Noel-Hill, 3rd Baron Berwick, PC, FSA (21 October 1773 – 4 August 1842) was a British peer, politician and diplomatist.

Born William Hill, he was the second son of Noel Hill, who was created first Baron Berwick in 1784, and his wife, Anna, a maternal granddaughter of Thomas Wentworth, 1st Earl of Strafford. He was educated at Rugby School and Jesus College, Cambridge, graduating M.A. in 1793.

He was Tory Member of Parliament for Shrewsbury from 1796 to 1812, when he retired on account of his absences abroad. In 1814 he replaced his brother-in-law Lord Ailesbury (who had inherited his father's earldom) as MP for Marlborough and kept the seat until the 1818 general election, although he spent little time in Parliament.

He held command, as major, of the Shrewsbury Yeomanry Cavalry from its inception in 1798 until 1804, when the command was handed to Charles Dallas, and of the Shropshire Militia as lieutenant-colonel from 1801 to 1814, although diplomatic duty abroad took him away from duty in this country.

Hill went to France as attaché to the British chargé d'affaires in Paris in November 1801, and was on duty during the truce brought about by the Peace of Amiens. When war with Napoleon resumed he was briefly in captivity but escaped to England. In 1805, Hill was appointed ambassador to Ratisbon (though the Napoleonic Wars prevented him from taking up office), to the Kingdom of Sardinia, whose court was exiled by the war in Cagliari in 1807 and at Turin in 1814 following Napoleon's defeat, and to the Kingdom of the Two Sicilies at Naples in 1824. That same year he and his younger brother assumed the additional surname of Noel, from his grandfather, and was created a Privy Councillor. In 1822, he had rejected George Canning's offer of the post of Parliamentary Under-Secretary of State for Foreign Affairs.

In 1832, he inherited the barony of Berwick from his childless older brother, Thomas. Although he was briefly engaged to Lady Hester Stanhope, he died unmarried and without legitimate issue at Red Rice, Hampshire, in 1842, aged sixty-eight, and his title passed to his younger brother, Richard. He was buried in the family vault at St Eata's parish church, Atcham.

== Coat of arms ==
Coat of arms of William Noel-Hill, 3rd Baron Berwick
Notes Coat of arms of Baron Berwick Coronet A coronet of a Baron Crest 1st: A Stag statant Argent (Hill); 2nd: On the Battlements of a Tower a Hind statant Argent collared and chained Or (Noel); 3rd: A Stag's Head caboshed Sable in the mouth a Sprig of Oak proper (Harwood) Escutcheon Quarterly, 1st and 4th, Ermine on a Fess Sable a Castle with two Towers Argent on a Canton Gules a Martlet Or (Hill); 2nd, Or fretty Gules a Canton Ermine (Noel); 4th, Or a Chevron between three Stags' Heads caboshed Gules (Harwood Supporters Dexter: A Pegasus Argent gorged with a Plain Collar Sable thereon a Martlet Or; Sinister: A Stag Argent attired Or gorged with a Plain Collar Sable thereon a Leopard's Face Gold and a chain reflexed over the back also Gold Motto Qui uti scit ei bona

== Notes ==
Parliament of Great Britain
Preceded by William Pulteney and John Hill	Member of Parliament for Shrewsbury; 1796–1800; With: William Pulteney	Succeeded by Parliament of the United Kingdom
Parliament of the United Kingdom
Preceded by Parliament of Great Britain	Member of Parliament for Shrewsbury; 1801–1812; With: William Pulteney 1801–05, John Hill 1805–06, Henry Grey Bennet 1806–07, Thomas Jones 1807–11, Henry Grey Bennet 1811–12	Succeeded by Henry Grey Bennet and Sir Rowland Hill
Preceded by Lord Bruce and Edward Stopford	Member of Parliament for Marlborough; 1814–1818; With: Edward Stopford	Succeeded by Lord Brudenell and Hon. John Wodehouse
Diplomatic posts
Preceded by Thomas Jackson	British Minister to Sardinia; 1807–1824	Succeeded by Augustus Foster
Peerage of Great Britain
Preceded by Thomas Hill	Baron Berwick; 1832–1842	Succeeded by Richard Noel-Hill
