= Baron Berwick =

Barony in the Peerage of Great Britain

Barony of Berwick
- Arms: Quarterly, 1st and 4th, Ermine on a Fess Sable a Castle with two Towers Argent on a Canton Gules a Martlet Or (Hill); 2nd, Or fretty Gules a Canton Ermine (Noel); 4th, Or a Chevron between three Stags' Heads caboshed Gules (Harwood). Crest: 1st: A Stag statant Argent (Hill); 2nd: On the Battlements of a Tower a Hind statant Argent collared and chained Or (Noel); 3rd: A Stag's Head caboshed Sable in the mouth a Sprig of Oak proper (Harwood). Supporters: Dexter: A Pegasus Argent gorged with a Plain Collar Sable thereon a Martlet Or; Sinister: A Stag Argent attired Or gorged with a Plain Collar Sable thereon a Leopard's Face Gold and a chain reflexed over the back also Gold.
- Creation date: 19 May 1784
- Created by: George III
- Peerage: Peerage of Great Britain
- First holder: Noel Hill, 1st Baron Berwick
- Last holder: Charles Noel-Hill, 9th Baron Berwick
- Remainder to: Heirs male of the first baron's body lawfully begotten
- Extinction date: 27 January 1953
- Seats: Tern Park, Shropshire
- Motto: Qui Uti Scit Ei Bona ("He should possess wealth who knows how to use it")

Baron Berwick, of Attingham Park in the County of Shropshire, was a title in the Peerage of Great Britain. It was created in 1784 for Noel Hill, who had earlier represented Shrewsbury and Shropshire in Parliament. He was the son of Thomas Hill (originally Thomas Harwood), son of Thomas Harwood, a draper, of Shrewsbury, Shropshire. His paternal grandmother was Margaret, daughter of Rowland Hill, sister of Sir Richard Hill and aunt of Sir Rowland Hill, 1st Baronet, ancestor of the Viscounts Hill. Hill's father had assumed the surname of Hill in lieu of his patronymic on succeeding to the Hill estates through his mother. Lord Berwick was succeeded by his eldest son, the second Baron. He was a patron of art. He died childless and was succeeded by his younger brother, the third Baron. He was a diplomat and politician. In 1824 he assumed by Royal licence the additional surname of Noel, which was that of his maternal grandfather, William Noel, younger son of Sir John Noel, 4th Baronet, of Kirkby Mallory (see Noel Baronets).

Lord Berwick died unmarried and was succeeded by his younger brother, the fourth Baron. He was a clergyman. He also assumed the additional surname of Noel by Royal licence in 1824. Two of his sons, the fifth and sixth Barons, both succeeded in the title. Both died unmarried and on the death of the sixth Baron the title passed to his nephew, the seventh Baron. He was the son of the Hon. Thomas Henry Noel-Hill, younger son of the fourth Baron. He was childless and was succeeded by his nephew, the eighth Baron. He was the son of Reverend the Hon. Thomas Noel-Hill, younger brother of the seventh Baron. 8th Baron had no children. The title became extinct on the death of his second cousin who died without legitimate issue, the ninth Baron, in 1953.

The family seat was Attingham Park, Atcham, Shropshire.

== Barons Berwick (1784) ==
- Noel Hill, 1st Baron Berwick (1745–1789)
- Thomas Noel Hill, 2nd Baron Berwick (1770–1832)
- William Noel-Hill, 3rd Baron Berwick (1773–1842)
- Richard Noel-Hill, 4th Baron Berwick (1774–1848)
- Richard Noel Noel-Hill, 5th Baron Berwick (1800–1861)
- William Noel-Hill, 6th Baron Berwick (1802–1882)
- Richard Henry Noel-Hill, 7th Baron Berwick (1847–1897)
- Thomas Henry Noel-Hill, 8th Baron Berwick (1877–1947)
- Charles Michael Wentworth Noel-Hill, 9th Baron Berwick (1897–1953)

== See also ==
- Viscount Hill
- Noel baronets
- Baron Hume of Berwick
- Lord Lloyd of Berwick
