= Peter Bridgeman =

British Army officer (1933–2013)

Lieutenant-Colonel Peter Orlando Ronald Bridgeman, TD, DL (9 May 1933 – 25 July 2013) was a British military officer.

The son of Lieutenant-Colonel Henry Bridgeman and Joan Constable-Maxwell, and grandson of the 4th Earl of Bradford, he was educated at Ampleforth College, Yorkshire.

Bridgeman served in the Scots Guards and the 7th Battalion, Royal Northumberland Fusiliers, reaching the rank of Lieutenant-Colonel. He was decorated with the Territorial Decoration in 1968. In 1975, he became High Sheriff of Northumberland, and in 1983 Deputy Lieutenant of Northumberland. He was also a knight of the Sovereign Military Order of Malta.

On 4 May 1967, Bridgeman married Sarah Jane Davina Corbett, daughter of Patrick Geoffrey Corbett. They had three children, one son and two daughters.
