= Kinnerley =

Village in Shropshire, England

Coordinates: 52.781°N 2.982°W

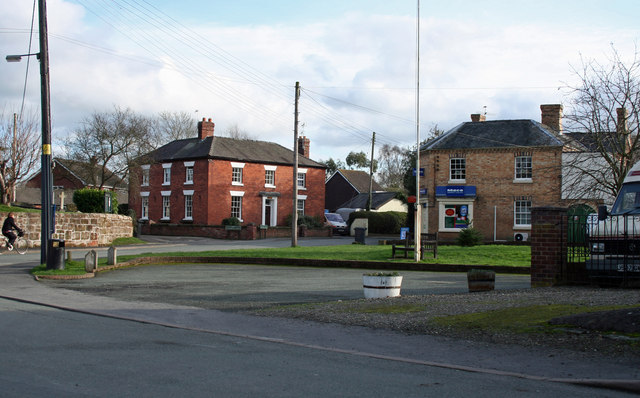
- Kinnerley village centre

- Location within Shropshire
- Population: 1,108 (2011)
- OS grid reference: SJ337209
  - London: 173miles
- Civil parish: Kinnerley
- Unitary authority: Shropshire
- Ceremonial county: Shropshire
- Region: West Midlands
- Country: England
- Sovereign state: United Kingdom
- Post town: Oswestry
- Postcode district: SY10
- Dialling code: 01691
- Police: West Mercia
- Fire: Shropshire
- Ambulance: West Midlands
- UK Parliament: North Shropshire

Kinnerley (historic Welsh name: Generdinlle) is a small village in Shropshire, England. It lies between the neighbouring villages of Dovaston and Pentre and the nearest town is Oswestry. To the north is the village of Knockin.

== History ==
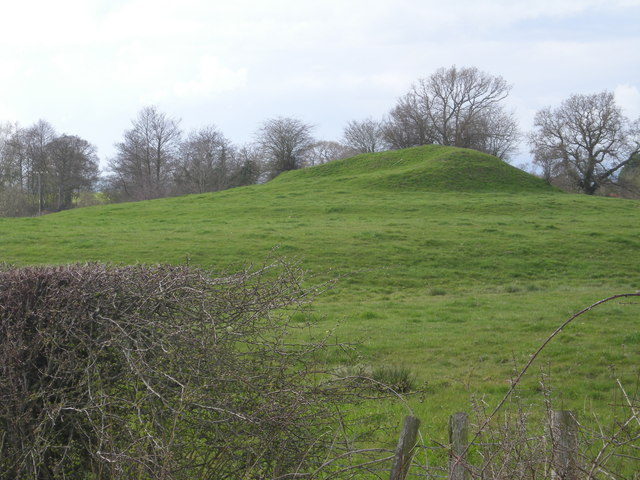
Belan Bank Motte

A mile to the south is the motte and bailey castle known as Belan Bank. The medieval castle was destroyed by Llywelyn ap Gruffudd, Prince of Wales, during the reign of Henry III.

John Bridgeman, Bishop of Chester, who died in 1652, is buried in St Mary's parish church, and Alfred Payne, a first-class cricketer who died in 1927, is buried in the churchyard.

To the north of the village is the site of Lady Ida's Well close to the Weir Brook. It takes its name from Lady Ida Lumley, wife of the 4th Earl of Bradford, who discovered a natural water spring in 1895 and championed its health benefits.

=== Wartime role ===
In the Second World War the area around the village became a top-secret bomb storage depot. Kinnerley was chosen because of its central location within the UK and because it had a railway link. The line was operated by the military (until it was closed in 1960). The huge site, which had extensive sidings and covered buildings, was created by the Royal Engineers:

More than 200 huge storage sheds, camouflaged and decked out with turfed roofs, were built around the village of Kinnerley. Each was served by a railway siding which entered each building, allowing the highly dangerous cargo to be unloaded inside. BBC

The area was heavily guarded and was not declassified until the mid-1950s.

== Transport ==
The village was formerly served by rail with stops at Kinnerley Junction and Edgerley Halt, on the now defunct Shropshire and Montgomeryshire Railway, that ran from 1866 to 1960.

Kinnerley is currently served by the 576 Shrewsbury to Oswestry bus route.

== Amenities ==
The village today has a primary school, a church, a cemetery, a Village Hall, a park, and a shop. Its pub (the Cross Keys) closed in 2014 following a fire. On 1 October 2015 the pub was purchased as a community asset to be refurbished and re-opened in 2019. It is home to the acting society known as 'The Kinnerley Players' and also has its own football team.

== See also ==
- Listed buildings in Kinnerley
