= Henry Bridgeman (British Army officer) =

British soldier (1882–1972)

Henry George Orlando Bridgeman DSO, MC, DL, JP, (15 August 1882 – 19 May 1972), styled The Honourable from 1898, was a British soldier.

== Background and education ==
He was the third son of the George Bridgeman, 4th Earl of Bradford, and his wife, Lady Ida Frances Annabella Lumley, second daughter of Richard Lumley, 9th Earl of Scarbrough. His older brother was Orlando Bridgeman, 5th Earl of Bradford. Bridgeman was educated at Harrow School and went then to the Royal Military Academy, Woolwich.

== Career ==
In 1901, Bridgeman was commissioned into the Royal Field Artillery as a second lieutenant and from 1905 served as aide-de-camp to Francis Grenfell, 1st Baron Grenfell, at that time Commander-in-Chief, Ireland. After the latter's resignation in 1908, Bridgeman held the same post to his successor Sir Neville Lyttelton. Several months later, he was sent to India with the Royal Horse Artillery. Promoted to captain, he returned to England at the outbreak of the First World War in 1914. He received command of a battery and was sent to France. Bridgeman was advanced to major in 1915 and in early 1917 joined 47th Divisional Artillery as Brigade major. In the following year, he was decorated with the Military Cross and in 1917 with the Distinguished Service Order (DSO). From November 1918 until demobilisation Bridgeman commanded 236th Brigade, Royal Field Artillery, in 47th Division as acting lieutenant-colonel. During the war he was mentioned in despatches five times and after its end was awarded the Order of Danilo of Montenegro. Confirmed in his last rank Bridgeman was sent on the reserve list in May 1919 and retired finally in 1937, having reached the age limit.

He became a justice of the peace for Northumberland in 1945 and a deputy lieutenant of the same county one year later.

== Family ==
On 30 December 1930, he married Joan, youngest daughter of Hon. Bernard Constable-Maxwell, son of William Constable-Maxwell, 10th Lord Herries of Terregles, and had by her four children, two sons and as many daughters. In 1946, Bridgeman purchased Fallodon Hall in Northumberland, formerly the home of Edward Grey, 1st Viscount Grey of Fallodon, from Captain Sir Cecil Graves, Grey's nephew.

His older son Peter (1933–2013) was an officer in the British Army.

Bridgeman's wife survived her husband until 1991.
