= Ida Bridgeman, Countess of Bradford =

British noblewoman (1848–1936)

The Right Honourable The Countess of Bradford
- Born: Ida Frances Annabella Lumley; 28 November 1848; Tickhill Castle
- Died: 22 August 1936 (aged 87)
- Burial place: St Andrew's Church, Weston-under-Lizard
- Occupation: Lady of the Bedchamber
- Spouse: George Bridgeman, 4th Earl of Bradford (m. 1869; died 1915)
- Children: Lady Beatrice Pretyman; Margaret Montagu-Douglas-Scott, Duchess of Buccleuch; Orlando Bridgeman, 5th Earl of Bradford; Helena Molyneux, Countess of Sefton, and had children; Lady Florence Norman; Hon. Richard Bridgeman; Hon. Henry Bridgeman
- Parent(s): Richard Lumley, 9th Earl of Scarbrough; Frederica Mary Adeliza Drummond

Ida Bridgeman, Countess of Bradford (née Lady Ida Frances Annabella Lumley, 28 November 1848 – 22 August 1936), was a British noblewoman who served as a Lady of the Bedchamber for Mary of Teck. She was the wife of George Bridgeman, 4th Earl of Bradford, and the mother of Orlando Bridgeman, 5th Earl of Bradford.

Lady Ida was born at Tickhill Castle, the daughter of Richard Lumley, 9th Earl of Scarbrough, and his wife, the former Frederica Mary Adeliza Drummond. She married George Bridgeman, then Viscount Newport, on 7 September 1869 at Maltby, Yorkshire. Their children were:

- Lady Beatrice Adine Bridgeman (1870–1952), who married Colonel Rt. Hon. Ernest George Pretyman and had children.
- Lady Margaret Alice Bridgeman (1872–1954), who married John Montagu-Douglas-Scott, 7th Duke of Buccleuch, and had children, including Princess Alice, Duchess of Gloucester.
- Orlando Bridgeman, 5th Earl of Bradford (1873–1957).
- Lady Helena Mary Bridgeman (1875–1947), who married Osbert Molyneux, 6th Earl of Sefton, and had children.
- Lady Florence Sibell Bridgeman (1877–1936), who married Ronald Collet Norman and had children.
- Commander The Hon. Richard Orlando Beaconsfield Bridgeman (28 February 1879 – 9 January 1917), who was awarded the Distinguished Service Order and died in East Africa after the plane in which he was flying as observer, with Sqdn. Cdr. Edwin Rowland Moon as pilot, was forced to land with engine trouble. He was buried in Dar Es Salaam CWGC Cemetery.
- Lieutenant-Colonel The Hon. Henry George Orlando Bridgeman (1882–1972), who married Joan Constable-Maxwell and had children.

The countess, then Viscountess Newport, became namesake of Lady Ida's Well close to the Weir Brook the north of the village of Kinnerley, Shropshire. It is a natural water spring that she discovered in 1895 and championed its health benefits.

The countess was a Lady of the Bedchamber to Mary of Teck, then Princess of Wales, in 1901–1902.

After the death of her husband in 1915, she became known as Dowager Countess of Bradford. She remained resident at the family home of Castle Bromwich Hall until her death, following which the house was rented out. She is buried with her husband at St Andrew's Church, Weston-under-Lizard, near the family seat of Weston Park.

== Arms ==
Coat of arms of Ida Bridgeman, Countess of Bradford
Escutcheon George Bridgeman, 5th Earl of Bradford (Sable ten plates four three two and one on a chief Argent a lion passant Ermines) impaling Richard Lumley, 9th Earl of Scarborough (Argent a fess Gules between three parrots Vert collared of the second). Supporters On either side a Lion guardant Gules pellettée.
