= Orlando Bridgeman, 5th Earl of Bradford =

British peer, politician and soldier (1873–1957)

Lieutenant-Colonel The Right Honourable The Earl of Bradford DL JP
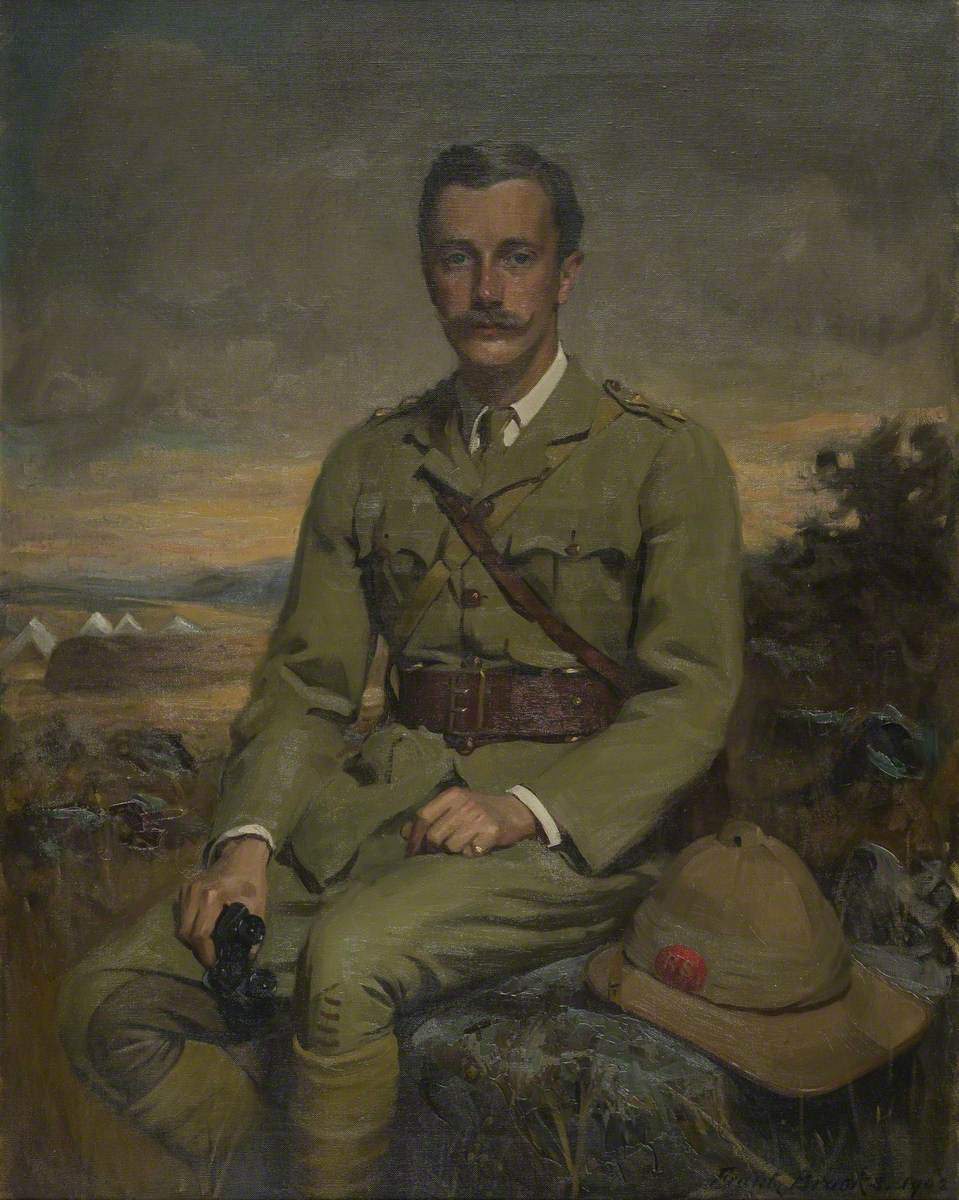
- Bridgeman, then Viscount Newport, in 1902

Member of the House of Lords
- Lord Temporal
- In office 2 January 1915 – 21 March 1957
- Preceded by: The 4th Earl of Bradford
- Succeeded by: The 6th Earl of Bradford

Personal details
- Born: Orlando Bridgeman; 6 October 1873
- Died: 21 March 1957 (aged 83)
- Spouse: Margaret Cecilia Bruce (m. 1904; died 1949)
- Children: Lady Diana Abdy; Hon. Ursula Bridgeman; Gerald Bridgeman, 6th Earl of Bradford; Anne Pearson, Viscountess Cowdray; Lady Joan Bridgeman
- Parent(s): George Bridgeman, 4th Earl of Bradford; Lady Ida Lumley
- Other titles: 6th Baron Bradford; 10th Baronet (of Great Lever)

Lieutenant-Colonel Orlando Bridgeman, 5th Earl of Bradford (6 October 1873 – 21 March 1957), styled Viscount Newport from 1898 to 1915, was a British peer, Conservative politician and soldier.

== Background ==
Bridgeman was the oldest son of George Bridgeman, 4th Earl of Bradford, and his wife Lady Ida (née Lumley), the second daughter of Richard Lumley, 9th Earl of Scarbrough. Bridgeman was educated at Harrow School and went then to Trinity College, Cambridge, where he graduated with a Bachelor of Arts in 1896 and with a Master of Arts in 1903. At Cambridge, he was secretary of the Pitt Club. He succeeded his father as earl in 1915. He owned up to 20,000 acres (8,100 ha). In 1918 he purchased Boscobel House in Shropshire and later gave the house and its famous Royal Oak to the Ministry of Works in 1954.

== Career ==
Bridgeman joined the 3rd (Edinburgh Light Infantry Militia) Battalion, Royal Scots, and was appointed a captain on 29 April 1899. The battalion was embodied in December 1899 to serve in the Second Boer War, and in early March 1900 left Queenstown, Ireland, on the SS Oriental for South Africa. He fought in the war after arrival in 1900, and again in 1902, returning from Cape Town to the United Kingdom with most of his regiment in May 1902. He again fought in the First World War from 1915 as a lieutenant-colonel. He played country house cricket in the 1890s. Bridgeman was appointed Honorary Colonel of the King's Shropshire Light Infantry in 1939.

Bridgeman was assistant private secretary to Robert Gascoyne-Cecil, 3rd Marquess of Salisbury, in his posts as Secretary of State for Foreign Affairs between 1898 and 1900 and as Prime Minister of the United Kingdom for a few weeks during the summer of 1902. Salisbury resigned on 11 July 1902, and Lord Newport subsequently was private secretary to Salisbury's successor Arthur Balfour from July 1902 until 1905. Having joined the House of Lords on his father's death, Bridgeman became Government Whip in 1919, a post he held until 1924. He was Justice of the Peace for Shropshire and represented the latter county as well as Warwickshire as Deputy Lieutenant, too. In 1932 he served as treasurer of the Royal Salop Infirmary in Shrewsbury.

== Family ==
On 21 July 1904, he married the Hon. Margaret Cecilia Bruce, daughter of Henry Bruce, 2nd Baron Aberdare. They had five children:

- Lady Helen Diana Bridgeman (22 June 1907 – 7 May 1967), married Sir Robert Abdy, 5th Bt. (11 September 1896 – 17 November 1976), on 10 February 1930 and divorced in 1962
- Hon. Ursula Mary Bridgeman (12 July 1909 – 6 May 1912)
- Gerald Michael Orlando Bridgeman, 6th Earl of Bradford (29 September 1911 – 30 August 1981)
- Lady Anne Pamela Bridgeman (12 June 1913 – 21 May 2009), married Lieutenant-Colonel John Pearson, 3rd Viscount Cowdray (27 February 1910 – 19 January 1995), on 19 July 1939 and divorced in 1950
- Lady Joan Serena Bridgeman (29 May 1916 – 23 July 1935)

== Arms ==
Coat of arms of Orlando Bridgeman, 5th Earl of Bradford
Coronet That of a earl. Crest A demi-lion rampant argent holding between the paws a wreath of laurel proper. Escutcheon Sable, ten plates, four, three, two, and one, on a chief argent a lion passant ermines. Supporters Two leopards, guardant gules pelletée. Motto Nec temere, nec timide (Neither rashly nor timidly).

Political offices
Preceded by The Lord Herschell	Lord-in-waiting; 1919–1924	New government
Peerage of the United Kingdom
Preceded by George Bridgeman	Earl of Bradford; 2nd creation 1915–1957; Member of the House of Lords (1915–1957)	Succeeded by Gerald Bridgeman
Peerage of Great Britain
Preceded by George Bridgeman	Baron Bradford; 1915–1957	Succeeded by Gerald Bridgeman
Baronetage of England
Preceded by George Bridgeman	Baronet of Great Lever; 1915–1957	Succeeded by Gerald Bridgeman
