= Alfred Payne (cricketer, born 1849) =

English cricketer

Personal information
- Full name: Alfred Ernest Payne
- Born: 29 December 1849; Oswestry, Shropshire, England
- Died: 30 June 1927 (aged 77); Ruabon, Denbighshire, Wales
- Batting: Unknown
- Bowling: Unknown

Domestic team information
- Years: Team
- 1883–1884: Marylebone Cricket Club

Career statistics
Competition	First-class
Matches	8
Runs scored	75
Batting average	5.35
100s/50s	0/0
Top score	16
Balls bowled	8
Wickets	0
Bowling average	–
5 wickets in innings	0
10 wickets in match	0
Best bowling	–
Catches/stumpings	2/–
- Source: Cricinfo, 31 August 2019

Alfred Ernest Payne (29 December 1849 – 30 June 1927) was an English first-class cricketer.

The second son of Frederick Alexander Payne, he was born at Pentre Ucha, Llanymynech near Oswestry, Shropshire, in December 1849. He was educated at Cheltenham Grammar School. He later studied at Pembroke College, Oxford where he graduated B.A., converted to M.A. in 1867, and was by 1879 a student of the Inner Temple, though he was never called to the bar. In meantime he also acted as tutor to the sons of the Earl of Dudley.

At university, Payne was also a rower in his college XI, achieving Head of River in 1872, and at Henley.

He made his debut in first-class cricket for the Marylebone Cricket Club (MCC) against Cambridge University at Fenner's in 1883. He played first-class cricket for the MCC until 1884, making seven appearances. Despite playing as a batsman for the MCC, Payne struggled in first-class cricket, scoring just 64 runs at an average of 5.33. He also made a first-class appearance for W. G. Grace's personal XI against Lord Sheffield's XI at Sheffield Park in 1883.

Below first-class cricket, he played at county level for Shropshire between 1870 and 1904, in 118 matches in which he totaled 3,386 runs, achieved 4 centuries and took 231 wickets; in 1888 he captained the county XI. During that time he played at club level for Oswestry (of which he was captain 1881–88) and Baschurch in Shropshire and Llanfyllin in Montgomeryshire, Wales. He was a member of the Free Foresters from 1870.

Payne was a Justice of the Peace for the county of Shropshire and an Alderman of Shropshire County Council from 1898, and one time President of the Shropshire Chamber of Agriculture. Besides coming to own the Pentre Ucha estate, he was resident at Roden Hall, Wellington, Shropshire; Walford Manor, Baschurch, Shropshire and Dudwell House, Burwash, Sussex;

Payne married in 1878 Sarah, daughter of Thomas Protheroe of London, by whom he had two daughters.

Payne died aged 77 in June 1927 at Pen-y-Nant, Ruabon, Denbighshire. He was buried at Kinnerley parish church in Shropshire.
