= 6th County of London Brigade, Royal Field Artillery =

6th County of London Brigade, RFA 63rd (6th London) Field Brigade, RA 52nd (6th London) Anti-Tank Regiment, RA 263 (6th London) Light Regiment, RA
- Royal Artillery cap badge (pre-1953)
- Active: 1 April 1908 – 1 May 1961
- Country: United Kingdom
- Branch: Territorial Force
- Type: Artillery Brigade/Regiment
- Role: Field Artillery; Anti-Tank Artillery
- Part of: 47th (1/2nd London) Division; 60th (2/2nd London) Division; 5th Division; I Corps; 56th (London) Armoured Division
- Garrison/HQ: Brixton
- Engagements: First World War: Battle of Aubers Ridge; Battle of Festubert; Battle of Loos; Battle of the Somme; Battle of Messines; Battle of Cambrai; German spring offensive; Hundred Days Offensive; Salonika; Battle of Beersheba; Battle of Hareira and Sheria; Capture of Jerusalem; Transjordan raids; Battle of Megiddo; Second World War: Battle of Arras; Allied invasion of Sicily; Operation Baytown; Crossing of the Garigliano; Battle of Anzio; Operation Overlord; Buron; Operation Pheasant; Western Allied invasion of Germany

The 6th County of London Brigade, Royal Field Artillery was a new unit formed when Britain's Territorial Force was created in 1908. Its origin lay in Artillery Volunteer Corps formed in the Surrey suburbs of South London in the 1860s, which had later been incorporated into a larger London unit. Together with its wartime duplicate it served on the Western Front, at Salonika and in Palestine during the First World War. Converted to the anti-tank role just before the Second World War, it saw widely varied service during the war, while its duplicate regiment landed on D-Day. The regiment continued in the postwar Territorial Army until 1961.

== Volunteer Force ==
The enthusiasm for the Volunteer movement following an invasion scare in 1859 saw the creation of many Rifle, Artillery and Engineer Volunteer Corps composed of part-time soldiers eager to supplement the Regular British Army in time of need. Two such units were formed in South London, the 1st Surrey Artillery Volunteer Corps (AVC) on 12 October 1860 at 12 Union Place, Lambeth Road, and the 2nd Surrey AVC on 10 November 1860 at Brixton. At that time, Lambeth, Brixton and the surrounding area was part of Surrey but was later incorporated into the County of London. The 1st Surrey AVC began as a 'sub-division', was expanded to a battery on 15 December 1860, and additional batteries were formed on 4 May and 19 November 1861. However, recruiting dipped after the first enthusiasm wore off, and the unit was struck off on 27 May 1864. The 2nd Surrey AVC took the title of 1st Surrey AVC in 1866 and recruited widely: by 1877, it had reached a strength of 10 batteries recruited from Brixton, Loughborough Junction, Camberwell, and even Shepherd's Bush in Middlesex. By then, its headquarters (HQ) was at Loughborough Road, Brixton, moving to Camberwell in 1881. In March 1883, the unit amalgamated with the 1st London (City) AVC based in the City of London, to which the 1st Surrey AVC provided Nos 7–16 Batteries.

== Territorial Force ==
When the Volunteers were subsumed into the new Territorial Force (TF) on 1 May 1908 under the Haldane Reforms, the 1st City of London Artillery split to form three brigades in the Royal Field Artillery: I City of London Brigade in the city, VI County of London Brigade at Brixton, and VII County of London Brigade at Shepherd's Bush. The VI (or 6th) London Brigade was formed on 1 May 1908 from Nos 11–16 Companies of the 1st City Artillery, with the following organisation:

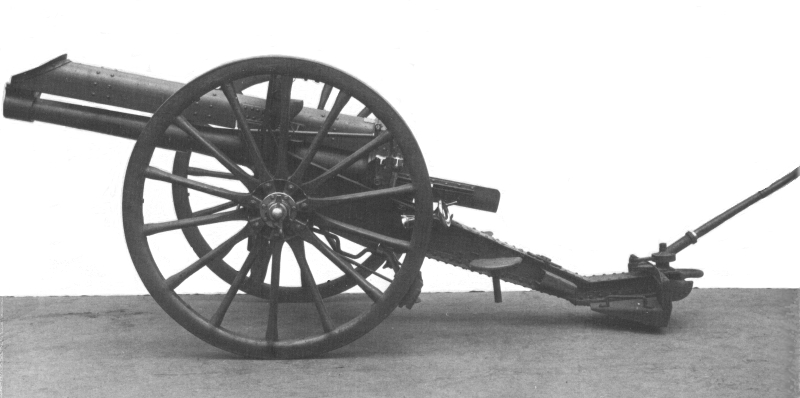
BLC 15-pounder gun issued to TF field brigades

- Brigade HQ at 105 Holland Road, Brixton
- 15th County of London Battery
- 16th County of London Battery
- 17th County of London Battery
- 6th London Ammunition Column

The first commanding officer (CO) was Colonel Sidney Wishart, VD, from the 1st City of London Artillery. The brigade was assigned to the 2nd London Division of the TF. The three batteries were each equipped with four 15-pounder guns.

== First World War ==
=== Mobilisation ===
When war broke out in August 1914, VI London Bde had already completed its annual training camp for the year, and the brigade was mobilised at Brixton under the command of Lieutenant-Colonel R.J. MacHugh, who had been Commanding Officer (CO) since 1912. After mobilisation, the 2nd London Division's artillery brigades moved to the country round Hemel Hempstead, Berkhamsted and Kings Langley in Hertfordshire to begin war training.

On the outbreak of war, TF units were invited to volunteer for Overseas Service. On 15 August 1914, the WO issued instructions to separate those men who had signed up for Home Service only, and form these into reserve units. On 31 August, the formation of a reserve or 2nd Line unit was authorised for each 1st Line unit where 60 per cent or more of the men had volunteered for Overseas Service. The titles of these 2nd Line units would be the same as the original, but distinguished by a '2/' prefix. In this way, duplicate batteries, brigades and divisions were created, mirroring those TF formations being sent overseas. Eventually these too were prepared for overseas service and 3rd Line reserve units were formed to produce reinforcement drafts to the others. The duplicate 2/VI London Brigade was formed in September 1914 and separated in March 1915 when 1/VI Brigade went overseas.

=== 1/VI London Brigade ===
At the end of October 1914, the 2nd London Division was chosen to reinforce the British Expeditionary Force (BEF) fighting on the Western Front and training was stepped up, despite bad weather and equipment shortages. Brigade and Divisional training began in February 1915 and it received its orders for the move to France on 2 March. By 22 March, all the batteries had reached the divisional concentration area around Béthune.

==== Aubers Ridge ====
While the division's infantry were introduced to trench routine by being attached in groups to the 1st and 2nd Divisions holding the line, the TF field batteries with their obsolescent 15-pounders were interspersed with those of the two Regular divisions equipped with modern 18-pounder guns. However, ammunition was very scarce, and the guns were restricted to three rounds per gun per day during April. Ammunition was being saved up for the Battle of Aubers Ridge on 9 May, when the 15-pounders of 1/VI London Bde joined with the guns of 1st and 2nd Divisions and the Royal Horse Artillery (RHA) to cut the barbed wire for the assault by 1st Division. The bombardment began at 05.00 with Shrapnel shell, then at 05.30 the guns switched to High Explosive (HE) shell to join the howitzers already firing at the German breastworks. At 05.40 the guns lifted to targets 600 yards (550 m) further back and the infantry moved to the attack. The attackers ran into devastating machine gun fire (there was no artillery barrage to suppress the defenders) and they found that the wire was inadequately cut and the breastworks barely touched. The inexperienced artillery had failed in all its tasks. A renewed bombardment was ordered from 06.15 to 07.00, but the artillery's forward observation officers (FOOs) were unable to locate the hidden German machine gun positions, which required a direct hit from an HE shell to be put out of action. The second attack failed as badly as the first, as did two others launched during the afternoon, and the survivors were pinned down in No man's land until nightfall, despite a further bombardment being laid on to allow them to withdraw.

==== Festubert ====
Although 2nd London Division suffered few casualties at Aubers Ridge, its gunners had learned a sobering lesson about the impossibility of suppressing strong defences with inadequate guns and shells. On 11 May, the division was redesignated 47th (1/2nd London) Division, and on the night of 14/15 May it took its place in the line for the Battle of Festubert. The guns were already in place, with 47th Divisional Artillery operating under the control of 7th Division. Despite the continuing shortage of ammunition, the plan this time was for a long methodical bombardment. On 13 and 14 May the field guns carried out three two-hour deliberate bombardments each day, attacking the wire with slow observed fire or keeping the enemy communication trenches under fire. At night, they carried out intermittent bombardments of the communication trenches and defences, to stop supplies being brought up and to prevent repairs being carried out. The guns fired about 100 rounds per day. During 15 May feint bombardments mimicking the moment of assault were carried out, but the actual attack was made after dark with some success. The fighting went on for several days, and 47th (2nd L) Division made its own first attack on the night of 25 May. The leading brigade captured the German front and support trenches, but were then pinned down by accurate German artillery fire and could advance no further. This effectively ended the battle. The heavy rate of fire during the battle was too much for the old 15-pdrs: by 26 May, 11 out of 36 guns in the division were out of action.

==== Loos ====
In June, 47th (2nd L) Division took over trenches in front of Loos-en-Gohelle from the French. This was the sector selected for the next major British attack (the Battle of Loos), to which part of 47th (2nd L) Division would provide the southern 'hinge'. 1/VI London Bde with its obsolescent guns was not assigned a major role in the complex artillery plan, and 10 of its guns remained in reserve at Haillicourt, behind the attack of 141st (5th London) Brigade. Supported by poison gas clouds, the attacking portion of 47th (2nd L) Division made good progress. However, events had not played out so well further north, at Hill 70 and the Hohenzollern Redoubt, and the battle raged on after 47th (2nd L) Division had been relieved between 28 September and 1 October.

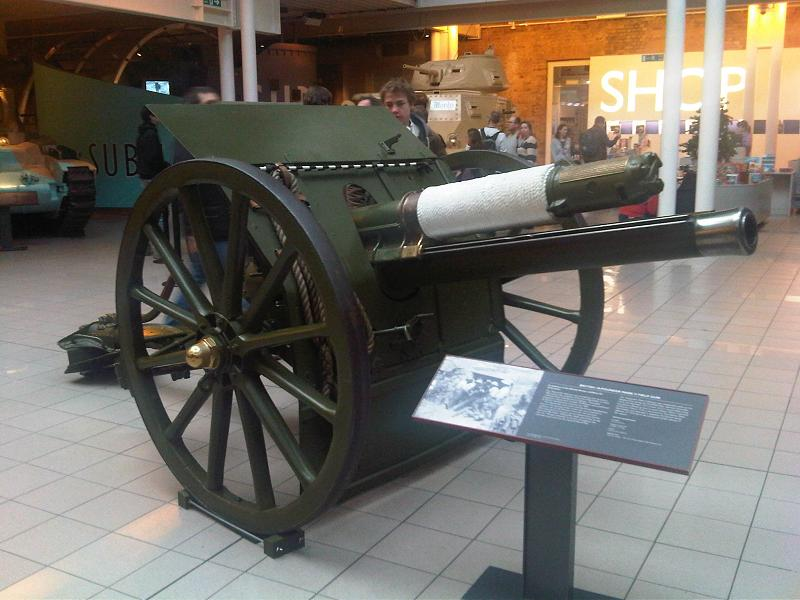
18-pounder preserved at the Imperial War Museum

On 13 October, 47th (2nd L) Division was in support for the final attack on the Hohenzollern Redoubt, and was practising on dummy trenches for a follow-up attack on Hulluch next day, but the results at the Hohenzollern were so disappointing that the operation was cancelled. The division took over the line and the artillery was in constant action over the following weeks. On 6 November 1915, the batteries of 1/VI London Bde were re-equipped with modern 18-pounders. Ammunition supply also improved, and the guns could be used for counter-battery (CB) work.

==== Spring 1916 ====
On 17 May 1916, 1/VI London Bde was renumbered CCXXXVI Bde (236 Bde) and the batteries were designated A, B and C. At the same time, it was joined by 1/22nd London Bty from 1/VIII London (Howitzer) Brigade (now CCXXXVIII Bde), which became D (H) Bty; it was equipped with four 4.5-inch howitzers. At this time the brigade ammunition columns (BACs) were abolished and incorporated into the divisional ammunition column (DAC).

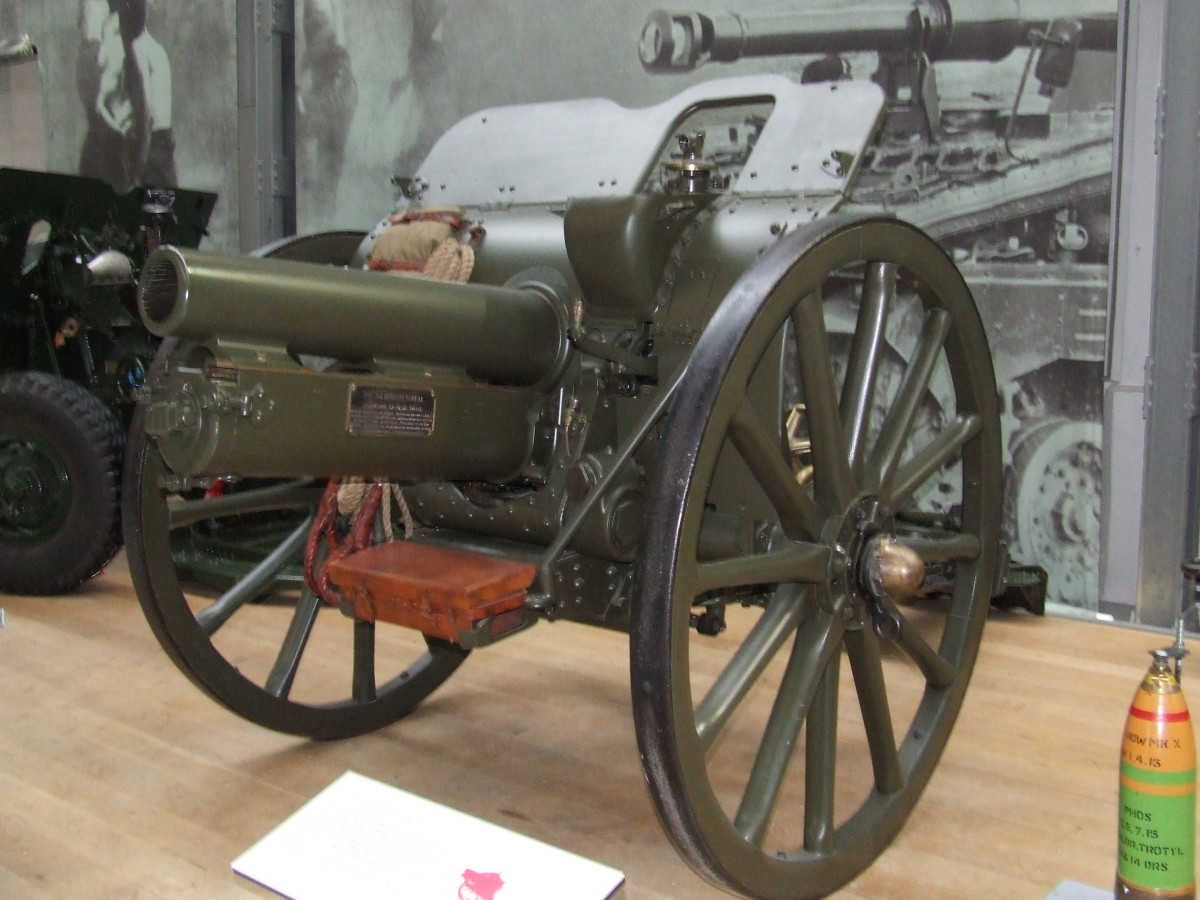
4.5-inch howitzer at the Royal Artillery Museum

In the Spring of 1916, 47th (2nd L) Division took over the lines facing Vimy Ridge. Active mine warfare was being conducted by both sides underground. In May, the Germans secretly assembled 80 batteries in the sector and on 21 May carried out a heavy bombardment in the morning; the bombardment resumed at 15.00 and an assault was launched at 15.45, while the guns lifted onto the British guns and fired a Box barrage into Zouave Valley to seal the attacked sector off from support. 47th Divisional Artillery reported 150 heavy shells an hour landing on its poorly-covered battery positions and guns being put out of action, while its own guns tried to respond to SOS calls from the infantry under attack, though most communications were cut by the box barrage. During the night the gun pits were shelled with gas, but on 22 May the artillery duel began to swing towards the British, with fresh batteries brought in, despite their shortage of ammunition. A system of 'one round strikes' was introduced: whenever a German battery was identified every gun in range fired one round at it, which effectively suppressed them. British counter-attacks were attempted, but when the fighting died down the Germans had succeeded in capturing the British front line.

==== Somme ====
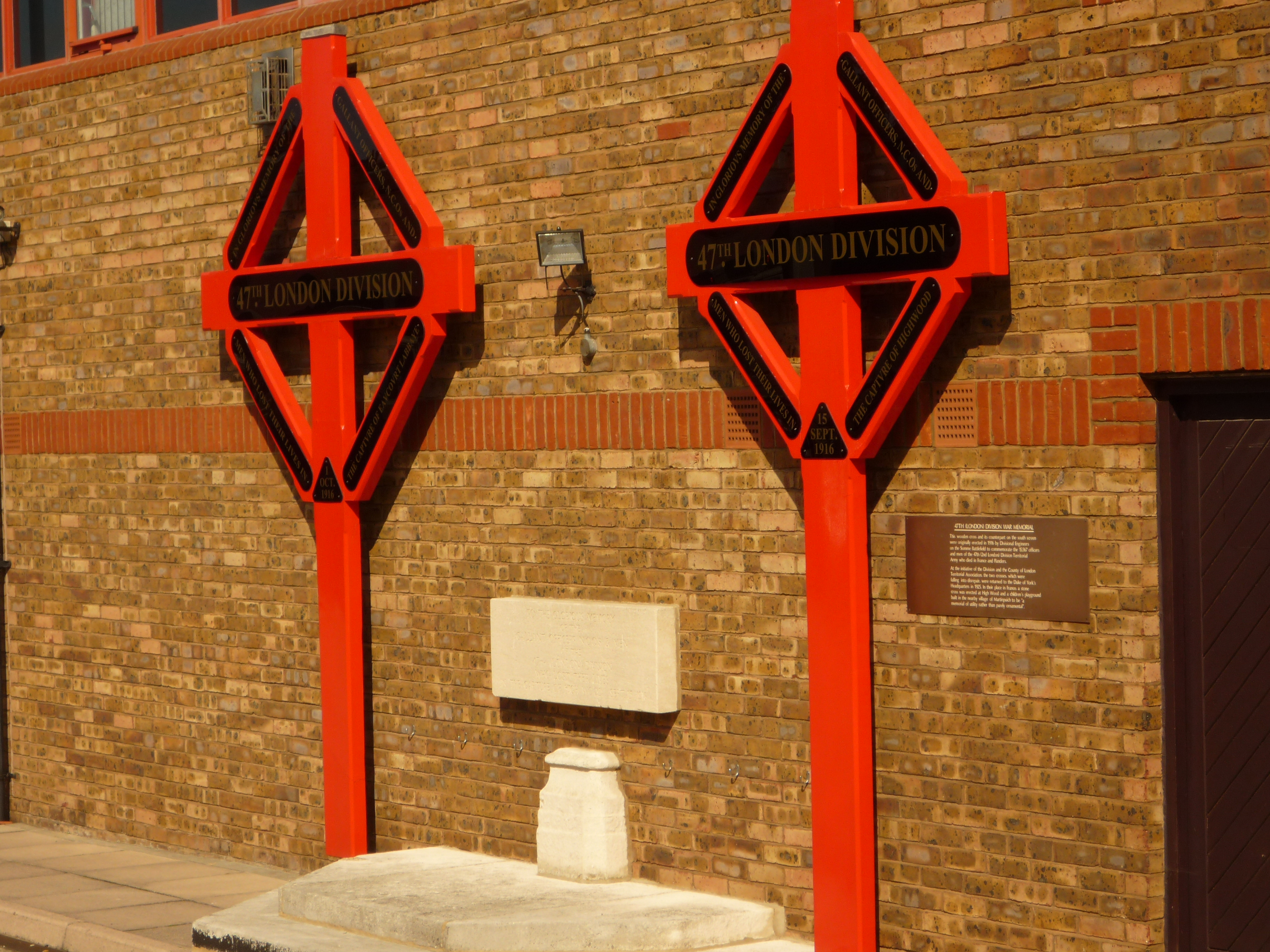
The two wooden memorial crosses originally erected at High Wood and Eaucourt L'Abbaye by 47th (2nd London) Division in 1916, now at Connaught House in Camberwell

On 1 August 1916, 47th (2nd L) Division began to move south to join in the Somme Offensive. While the infantry underwent training with the newly introduced tanks, the divisional artillery went into the line on 14 August in support of 15th (Scottish) Division. The batteries were positioned in Bottom Wood and near Mametz Wood, and became familiar with the ground over which 47th (2nd L) Division was to attack, while supporting 15th (S) Division's gradual encroachment on Martinpuich. Casualties among FOOs and signallers was heavy in this kind of fighting. Between 9 and 11 September, 47th (2nd L) Division took over the front in the High Wood sector, and on 15 September the Battle of Flers-Courcelette was launched, with tank support for the first time. The barrage fired by the divisional artillery left lanes through which the tanks could advance. However, the tanks proved useless in the tangled tree stumps of High Wood, and the artillery could not bombard the German front line because No man's land was so narrow. Casualties among the attacking infantry were extremely heavy, but they succeeded in capturing High Wood and the gun batteries began to move up in support, crossing deeply-cratered ground. Here casualties among the exposed guns and gunners took their toll, but a German counter-attack was broken up by gunfire. Next day the division fought to consolidate its positions round the captured 'Cough Drop' strongpoint. When the infantry were relieved on 19 September the artillery remained in the line under 1st Division.

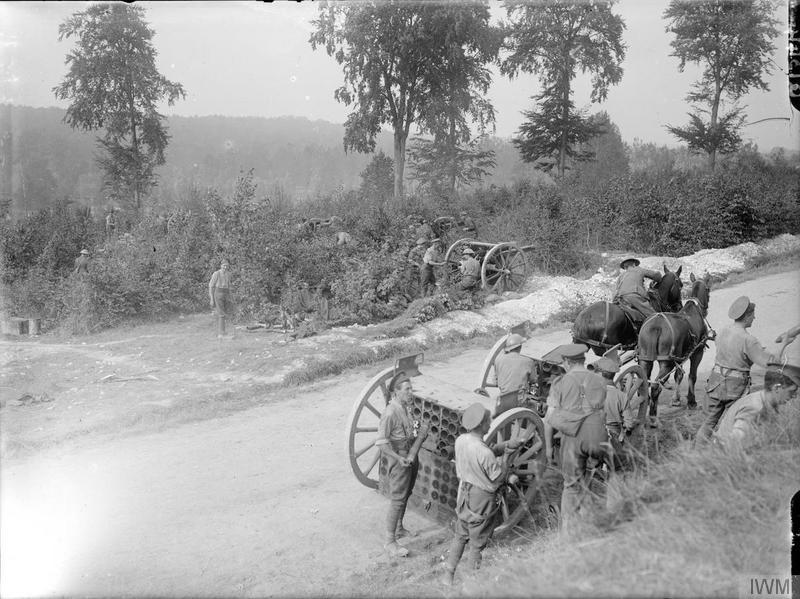
Bringing up ammunition for an 18-pounder battery during the Battle of the Somme

47th (2nd L) Division came back into the line to relieve 1st Division on 28/29 September, and began attacking Eaucourt L'Abbaye as part of the Battle of the Transloy Ridges, finally securing the ruins on 3 October. This allowed the batteries to cross the High Wood Ridge into a small valley where they remained for the rest of the Somme fighting, helping to cover the unsuccessful attacks by 47th (2nd L) Division and later 9th (Scottish) Division against the Butte de Warlencourt through October. By now, the gun lines were crowded together in deep mud, guns sank up to their axles, and getting ammunition through was extremely difficult. The artillery was finally relieved on 14 October and followed the rest of the division to the Ypres Salient.

A further reorganisation of the BEF's field artillery was carried out in November 1916. In CCXXXVI Bde, this meant that C Bty was broken up between A and B to bring them up to six guns each, and the brigade was joined by 523 (H) Bty, which had recently joined 47th Divisional Artillery from England and became C (H) Bty. Another reorganisation came on 19 January 1917, when C (H) Bty (523 (H) Bty) left to bring batteries in army field brigades up to six howitzers and was replaced by C/CCXXXVIII Bty (originally part of 1/VIII London Bde), while a section of D (H)/CCXXXV Bty (originally B (H) Bty from CLXXVI (Leicestershire) (H) Bde in 34th Division of New Army) joined D (H) Bty to bring it up to six howitzers. This gave the brigade its final organisation for the rest of the war:

- A Bty – 1/15th London Bty + half 1/17th London Bty
- B Bty – 1/16th London Bty + half 1/17th London Bty
- C Bty – 1/19th London Bty + half 1/18th London Bty
- D (H) Bty – 1/22nd London (H) Bty + half D (H)/CLXXVI (Leicestershire) Bty

==== Messines ====
At Ypres, 47th (2nd L) Division garrisoned the Hill 60 sector, where mine warfare had been conducted for two years, and where the British had dug a massive deep mine beneath the hill ready for the planned Battle of Messines. The divisional artillery was arranged in two groups, one in Ypres, the other in the Railway Dugouts. These battery positions were under enemy observation and were frequently shelled during the winter. On 16 January 1917 a German attack was anticipated, and the divisional artillery, together with that of 23rd and 41st Divisions and the Corps and Army heavy guns, carried out an intense bombardment, which brought considerable enemy retaliation. As well as organised bombardments of the enemy lines, the guns frequently responded to SOS calls from the front during enemy raids, and laid on wire-cutting and box barrages for British trench raids.

Several weeks before the Battle of Messines (7 June), the artillery had begun destructive shoots on various points in the enemy lines and communications, and began wire-cutting in May. The enemy response was fierce and casualties in men and guns were frequent. 47th (2nd L) Division's role in the attack was to advance on either side of the Ypres–Comines Canal, which was practised over taped-out courses behind the lines. On 31 May, bombardment of the enemy trenches became intense, and on 3 and 5 June the barrages were practised, forcing the Germans to retaliate and give away their gun positions. At 03.30 on 7 June, a series of massive mines were fired under the enemy lines from Hill 60 all along the Messines–Wytschaete Ridge, and the infantry began their advance. About two-thirds of the 18-pdrs fired a creeping barrage 30 yards (27 m) ahead of the infantry, while the remainder and the 4.5inch howitzers fired standing barrages 700 yards (640 m) ahead. The German defences were shattered by the mines and the bombardment, and the infantry cleared their first objectives with little difficulty. A standing barrage then protected them while they prepared for the second phase. On 47th (2nd L) Division's front, there was a hold-up at Spoil Bank by the canal in the second phase, but a new barrage was laid on this point and a renewed attack made at 19.00; although this too was held up, the position was later secured by the division. The field batteries were moved up to cover the new forward positions and to break up counter-attacks. During the battle, some 18-pdr batteries fired as many as 6000 rounds in 24 hours.

==== Ypres ====
After Messines, the division was withdrawn for training, and following a short spell back in the line at Hill 60 it was in reserve for the opening of the Third Ypres Offensive on 31 July. It held an active portion of the front under enemy observation from 18 August to 3 September, and advanced and improved the line, but the artillery found it difficult to inflict much damage on the enemy, which had adopted defence in depth with most of the troops hidden in dead ground. Between 8 and 17 September, the division was in the line again, making preparations for I ANZAC Corps' attack due on 20 September and keeping up pressure by means of frequent raids. One of these raids, on 15 September, employed a hurricane bombardment to rush a troublesome enemy strongpoint near Inverness Copse. 47th (2nd L) Division was then moved south on 21 September to join First Army leaving the artillery in the line for a while longer.

The division was stationed in a quiet sector in front of Oppy and Gavrelle. The British defences were not a continuous trench line, but a series of platoon or company strongpoints, the area between each to be covered by the artillery and machine guns. Once the divisional artillery joined from Ypres, close liaison with the infantry positions was achieved, and enemy positions were regularly bombarded. Wire-cutting for raids was also carried out, and smoke and incendiary ammunition was now available.

==== Cambrai ====
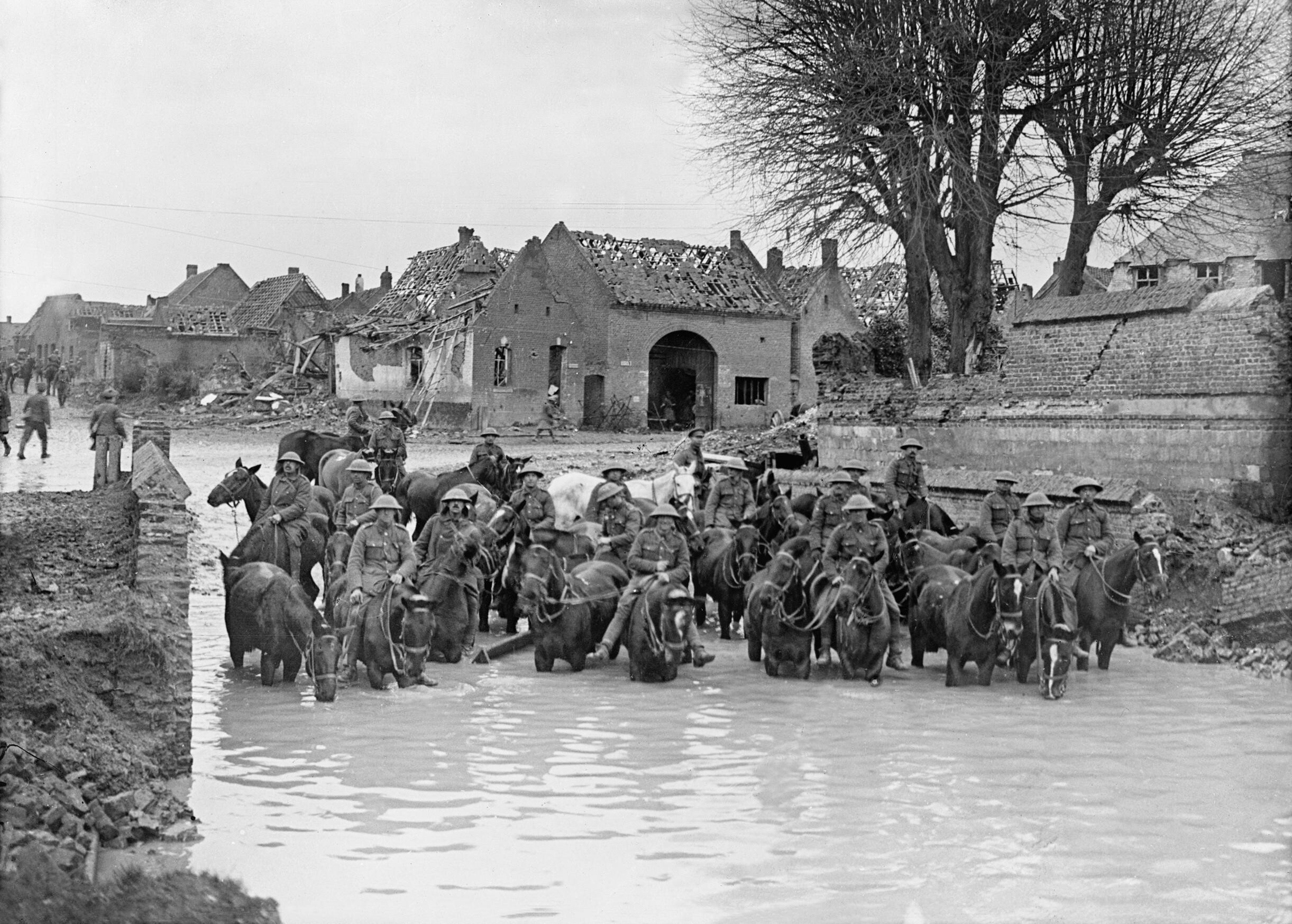
Drivers of 47th Divisional Artillery water their horses at Flesquières 24 November 1917 during the Battle of Cambrai

On 19 November, the division began a long march southwards, arriving on the night of 28/29 November to relieve the units holding Bourlon Wood, where fighting had been continuous since the launch of the Battle of Cambrai on 20 November. A major German counter-attack began the following morning. The infantry of 47th (2nd L) Division were covered by the artillery of the divisions they were relieving, while CCXXXVI Brigade under the command of Lt-Col A.H. Bowring was away calibrating its guns at ranges on the old Somme battlefield. Late in the afternoon it received orders to move up and support 20th (Light) Division, which was holding onto Welsh Ridge and La Vacquerie under heavy attack. The brigade moved off at 04.30 on 1 December and came into action on the forward slopes above Villers-Plouich, looking across at La Vacquerie only 3,000 yards (2,700 m) away. During the next few days, the enemy tried hard to get into La Vacquerie but the FOOs were able to bring down their batteries' fire to break up these attacks. The battery positions were at the edge of the enemy barrage, and some casualties were suffered among the guns in the open on the forward slope. Any spare time the gunners had between shoots was spent in removing stores from Villers-Plouich in preparation for a withdrawal. By 5 December, the battery positions were becoming precarious, and A and D Btys were withdrawn to the Beaucamp Valley and brigade HQ moved back to a chalkpit east of Havrincourt Wood. The waggon lines had been behind Gouzeaucourt Wood, but were shelled out on 6 December. By 8 December, B and C Btys were also withdrawn alongside brigade HQ, where the new line had stabilised.

==== Spring Offensive ====
While the infantry of 47th (2nd L) Division were withdrawn from the Flesquières salient to relatively comfortable winter quarters, the artillery remained in the line until 7 March 1918, when it was relieved and rejoined the division. The infantry took over the La Vacquerie sector from 2nd Division on the nights of 19/20 and 20/21 March. The anticipated German spring offensive (Operation Michael) began at 04.15 on 21 March (the Battle of St Quentin), before the artillery had arrived, and the division was supported by 2nd Division's artillery in the subsequent fighting. 47th Divisional Artillery was separated from its parent formation for the next two months.

CCXXXVI Brigade had been out of the line training in mobile warfare. By midday on 21 March it was on the road with orders to report to 19th (Western) Division, but on the way it was diverted to join 17th (Northern) Division, which assigned it positions near Vélu Wood. By 17.00, it was shelling German positions in Doignies and at 18.00 it fired an hour-long barrage to support 17th Division's counter-attack on Doignies, despite coming under hostile CB fire. Towards midnight, the batteries were moved back, picked up the transport and marched through Bapaume to support 6th Division, which was hard-pressed on the north side of the Cambrai road. A and B Batteries were sent north to positions east of Sapignies, while C and D Btys and brigade HQ took up positions at dawn east of Frémicourt. These batteries had to fire immediate barrages against the advancing German troops. The Germans pressed on throughout 22 March, and during the night C and D Btys were moved back west of Frémicourt. The brigade now came under the orders of 41st Division as the Germans pushed the British infantry back. On 24 March the guns came under heavy shellfire and had to withdraw to positions nearer Bapaume, and then went back further during the night to the shelter of the railway embankment near Achiet-le-Petit. Dawn revealed the British infantry streaming back, followed by the enemy, and the brigade as ordered back again: the gun teams galloped up from Achiet-le-Petit and the guns were pulled out, covered by fire from two tanks and a battery of CCXXXV Bde. After a massive traffic jam in Achiet-le-Petit was cleared, the brigade deployed around Bucquoy. But the line had been outflanked and the gun teams were shelled out of their positions, so the brigade was ordered back once more. By dawn on 26 March they were coming into action near Gommecourt, with the gun teams close by in case another retirement. But 4th Australian Brigade came up and filled the gap, and the line held firm, supported. by frequent barrage fire from the guns: a determined German attack at 17.00 failed. The line here held firm during the last days of March and the gun teams could be rested for the first time since 21 March. The line was supported by an ad hoc artillery ground commanded by Lt-Col Bowring, consisting of his own brigade together with two others from 41st Division. Enemy retaliation caused brigade HQ and D Bty to be moved to safer positions, bu there was no further retreat in this sector. On 5 April both of 47th (2nd L) Division's RFA brigades came under the command of 37th Division, supporting a counter-attack that disrupted the last phase of Operation Michael, the Battle of the Ancre, on this front. CCXXXVI Brigade remained in the line until it was finally relieved to a rest area near Abbeville on 9 May.

==== Hundred Days ====
47th (2nd London) Division was rejoined by its artillery at the end of May and went into corps reserve in late June. On 28 June, the artillery moved up to support an attack launched by the Australian Corps (the Battle of Hamel). The dawn attack was made with overwhelming artillery support, notable because to preserve secrecy the guns had not been able to register their barrage lines beforehand. CCXXXVI Brigade was able to turn a captured field gun onto the enemy.

The Allied Hundred Days Offensive began on 8 August 1918, and the artillery of 47th (2nd L) Division were once again detached, supporting 18th (Eastern) Division from 13 August to 4 September. CCXXXVI brigade found itself in the same dugouts in Caterpillar Valley that they had occupied in 1916. On 22 August 18th (E) Division formed a defensive flank while 47th (2nd L) Division attacked from in front of Amiens towards high ground beyond Happy Valley (the Battle of Albert). The night before the attack D (H)/CCXXXVI Bty had their commander and 35 men put out of action by enemy Mustard gas shelling. From now on the battle was constantly moving, and the British divisions began sending forward all-arms brigade groups including artillery batteries to clear strongholds and round up prisoners as they advanced. The field artillery frequently had to organise creeping barrages for these small operations, and casualties from enemy shellfire and gas were continuous.

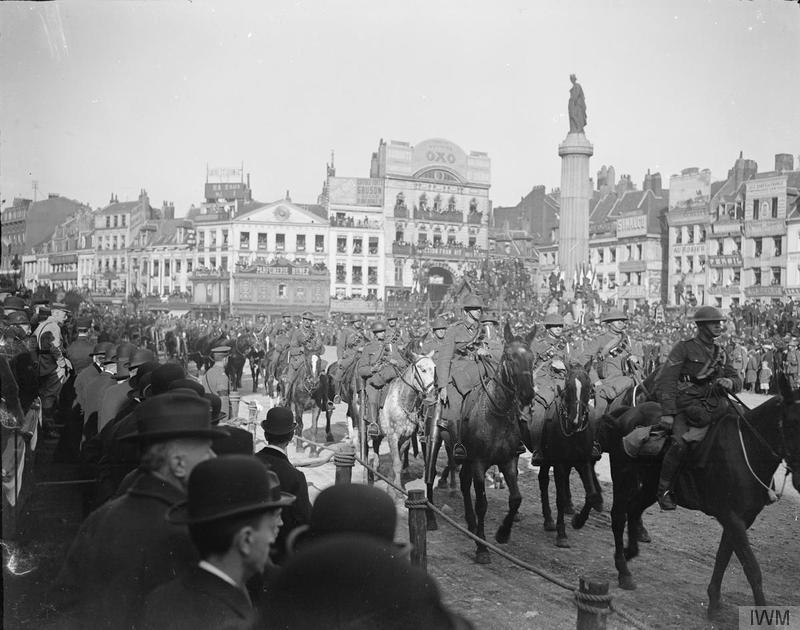
Artillery of 47th (2nd London) Division in the Grande Place during the official entry into Lille, 28 October 1918

Both 18th (E) and 47th (2nd L) Divisions, their infantry now very weak, were relieved in early September. 47th Divisional Artillery then moved by train (only the second time they had done this) to rejoin the rest of the division, which had been moved to the Lille front. The division was scheduled to be transferred to the Italian Front, but the orders wee changed and the division was put into the line to follow the retreating enemy across Aubers Ridge as far as the main Lille defences. After a 10-day pause, the division was relieved and once again prepared for the move to Italy. However, on 28 October this was finally changed, and 47th (2nd L) Division made the Official Entry into the liberated city of Lille on 28 October. It afterwards moved up to the River Scheldt, occupying Tournai when the enemy retired. It advanced beyond, but when the Armistice with Germany came into force on 11 November, 47th Division marched back to Tournai.

Immediately after the Armistice 47th (2nd L) Division was engaged in railway repairs. It went into winter quarters mining villages in the Béthune area to await demobilisation, which began in January 1919. By the end of March, units had been reduced to cadre strength, and these returned to England in May. The artillery brigades were demobilised at Shoreham-by-Sea in June 1919.

==== Commanding officers ====
The following commanded 1/VI London/CCXXXVI Brigade during the First World War:

- Lt-Col R.J. MacHugh, TD, from mobilisation to April 1915
- Lt-Col A.C. Lowe, DSO, (previously commanded 47th Divisional Ammunition Column) May 1915 to September 1917
- Lt-Col A.H. Bowring, September 1917 to November 1918
- Lt-Col the Hon H.G.O. Bridgeman, DSO, (previously Brigade major, RA, 47th Division) November 1918 to demobilisation

=== 2/VI London Brigade ===
The 2/2nd London Division came into existence quickly as volunteers rushed to join up. There were no guns or horses for the artillery, but the batteries improvised dummy guns mounted on hardcarts, with wooden sights and washing-lines for drag-ropes. Although the Master-General of the Ordnance, Major-General Sir Stanley von Donop, was pleased with their work and promised them the first guns available, it was not until February 1915 that some old 15-pdrs arrived for training. In March 1915, the division took the place of 1/2nd London Division in the St Albans area. At the end of May, now numbered 60th (2/2nd London) Division, it moved into Essex, with the artillery at Much Hadham. Finally, at the end of November it began to receive new 18-pdr guns and towards the end of January 1916 the division moved to the Warminster training area on Salisbury Plain.

On 28 April, 3/2 Wessex Bty arrived as a fourth 18-pdr battery for 2/VI London Brigade. Then, as with the TF artillery brigades in the BEF, those in 60th Division were numbered on 17 May, 2/VI Londons taking the number CCCI Brigade (301 Bde), and the batteries were lettered. 3/2 Wessex Bty was transferred to 2/VIII London (CCCIII) Brigade. The BACs were also absorbed into the DAC.

==== Western Front ====
60th (2/2nd London) Division's formation sign

On 14 June 1916, orders arrived for 60th Division to move to the Western Front, and the artillery units made the crossing from Southampton to Le Havre between 22 and 26 June, with CCCI Bde under the command of Lt-Col Thatcher. The division concentrated in the area behind Arras by 29 June. It relieved 51st (Highland) Division in the line on 14 July, with the artillery moving into position over the next three nights. The line held was facing the same strong German positions along Vimy Ridge that 47th (2nd L) Division had faced, and there was constant mine warfare and trench raiding. The artillery was mostly engaged in suppressing troublesome German trench mortars (Minenwerfers) by firing short concentrated bombardments on specific sectors of the enemy line. Some trench raids were preceded by local wirecutting bombardments, or by a barrage, others were 'stealth' raids.

On 30 August, the divisional artillery underwent the same reorganisation into six-gun batteries that was going on throughout the BEF. In CCCI Bde, this meant that A Bty was broken up to bring B and C up to six guns each, while D (H) Bty (originally 2/21 London Bty) joined from CCC Bde. On 20 October, the newly raised 519 (H) Bty arrived from England and became A (H) Bty. However, orders arrived on 1 November for the division to transfer to the Macedonian front (Salonika), where the four-gun different establishment was still in force. On 5 November A (H) Bty left for CCC Bde, and the original A Bty was reformed from its sections in B and C Btys. The BAC was also reformed. Once the brigade was in Macedonia, the six-gun battery establishment was introduced there as well, and A Bty was once again (and finally) split between B and C Btys, which were redesignated A and B. (It was not until 17 June 1917 that D (H) Bty was redesignated C (H)):

- A Bty – 2/16th London Bty + half 2/15th London Bty
- B Bty – 2/17th London Bty + half 2/15th London Bty
- C (H) Bty – 2/21st London (H) Bty

==== Salonika ====
Entrainment of the artillery for the embarkation port of Marseille began on 14 November and was a slow business due to lack of facilities: the drivers needed their wooden trench bridges to get their horses aboard the trains. All units were embarked and at sea by 12 December and proceeded to Salonika via Malta. Early in 1917, the division's units moved up the poor roads to the Lake Doiran sector and settled in to improve the defences and harass the enemy. Veterinary officers found that the transport horses and mules in this campaign were overworked, but that artillery horses lacked exercise and it became standard practice to allow them to wander at will during the day and then round them up a feeding times. In early March, the division began moving in bad weather to take over the line between Lake Doiran and the Vardar in preparation for the Allied Spring offensive. Apart from diversionary raids, 60th (2/2nd L) Division took little part in the first part of this operation (8–9 April), most of its batteries being used to reinforce the main attack near Lake Doiran, which required several days' artillery preparation. The division did attack during the second phase of the offensive (8/9 May), but it captured its objectives by night attacks without preliminary artillery fire. A further advance was made by the division on 15 May, but the rest of the offensive having come to a standstill it was called off on 24 May. On 1 June 1917, the division was marched back to Salonika to embark for Egypt.

==== Palestine ====
Immediately after landing at Alexandria 60th (2/2nd L) Division moved to the Suez Canal to join the Egyptian Expeditionary Force (EEF), where its units were reorganised. On 17 June, B Bty left to join a new CCLXVIII Bde being formed at El Ferdan for 74th (Yeomanry) Division.The BAC was also absorbed into the DAC once more. The division then underwent training before crossing Sinai in early July 1917. Further intensive training followed until late October, when the division made its first full-scale attack of the war, at Beersheba. In the weeks leading up to the attack artillery officers had regularly ridden close to the Beersheba defences to reconnoitre, often under fire. Concentration for the attack was carried out under cover of darkness, beginning on 20/21 October and completed on 28/29 October. The divisional artillery was divided into Right and Left groups corresponding to the two attacking brigade; CCCI Bde was part of Left Group under Lt-Cil Thatcher supporting 181st (2/6th London) Brigade. The whole force moved forward with great secrecy over featureless desert under moonlight on 30/31 October, the Royal Engineers improving the track north of Wadi ed Sabe for the artillery, which was in position by 01.30. All guns had 200 rounds available. At dawn the guns began to bombard Hill 1070, pausing at 07.00 to let the smoke and dust clear. At 08.30 the guns switched from wire-cutting to intensive bombardment, 181st Bde moving forward as the guns lifted, and taking the hill in 10 minutes. As soon as new Observation Posts (OPs) had been established on the hill the batteries galloped forward over the stony ground to begin wire-cutting on the main Turkish position. The general advance was resumed at 12.15 and 181st Brigade captured its objectives easily, 'thanks largely to the excellent work of the 301st Artillery group', according to the divisional history. By 13.00, the whole of the defence works were in British hands, and that evening the Desert Mounted Corps entered Beersheba.

The next phase of the offensive involved 60th (2/2nd L) Division in an attack on Kauwukah in the Turkish Sheria position (the Battle of Hareira and Sheria) on 6 November. The attacking brigades moved forwards at 03.30 with the artillery, which began wire-cutting as soon as it was in position. Each 18-pdr battery cut two 10 yards (9.1 m) gaps in the wire by 12.15, and then began a bombardment of the enemy trench as the attack went in against heavy fire. The field guns then lifted onto the works in the second line. The whole defensive position was in the division's hands by 14.00 and it pushed patrols ahead towards Sheria and its water supply. Sheria was captured at daybreak the following morning, without artillery preparation, but afterwards there was heavy fighting, and several Turkish counter-attacks were broken up by the field guns. The infantry brigade groups continued their advance the following day, supported by their artillery groups, and entered Huj.

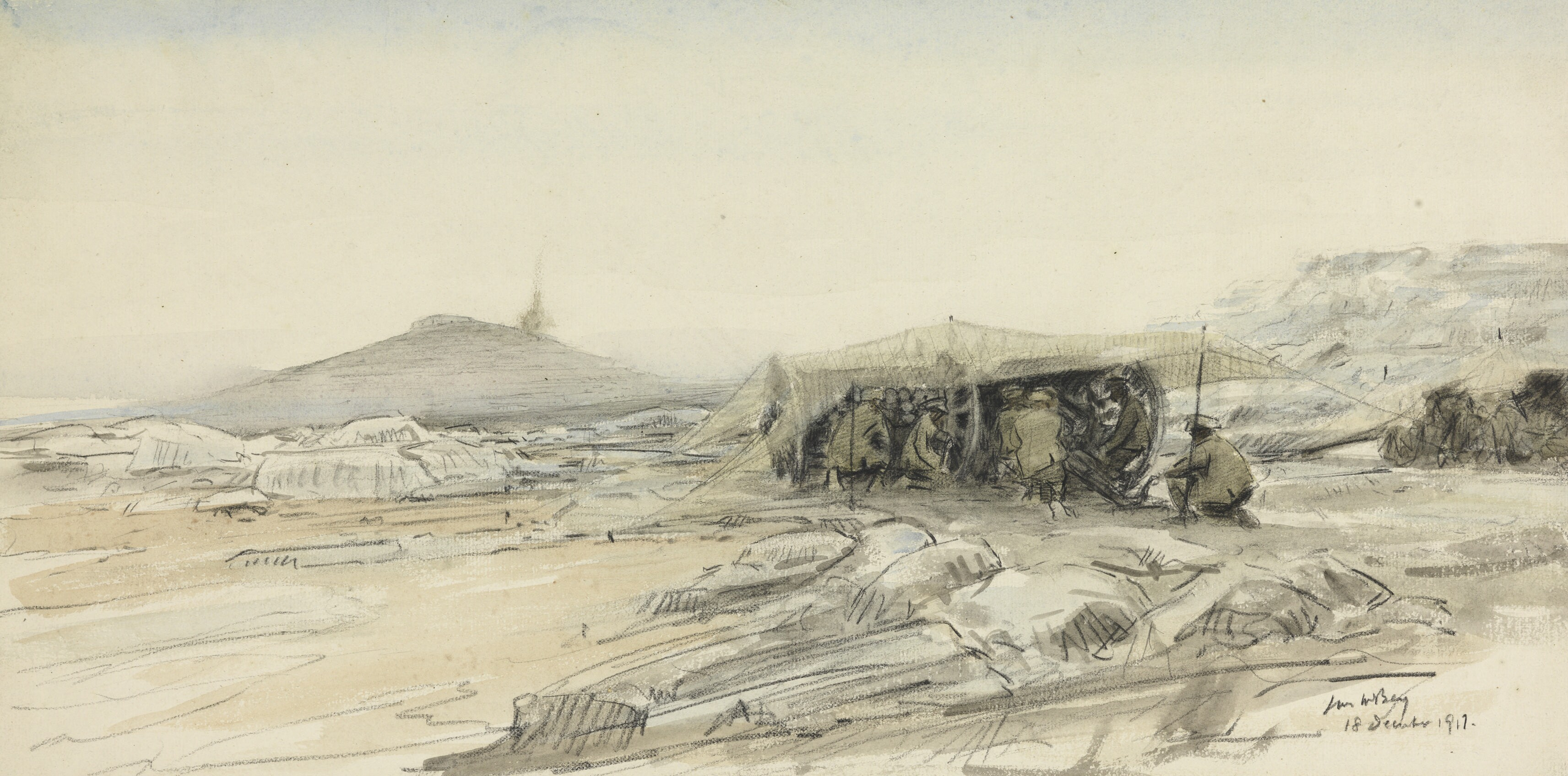
Drawing by James McBey of an RFA battery engaging Turkish batteries at Nebi Samwil

After a short rest at Huj, the division bivouacked at Gaza under heavy rain, then began a 42 miles (68 km) march through the mud to Junction Station, which it reached on 22 November. It now entered the last stage of the Battle of Nebi Samwil, where the objectives were a tangle of hill slopes, with tracks so bad that it was impossible to bring up the guns until roads had been made for them. Nebi Samwil had been captured by units of 75th Division, and the London battalions that relieved them came under fierce counter-attacks on 29 November; only the supporting British artillery fire allowed them to maintain their position. However, the way was now open to attack the final defences of Jerusalem; an encirclement was chosen, to avoid attacking the city itself. The surprise attack began on 8 December without artillery support; once progress had been made the batteries were to move up and come under command of the brigade groups. The going was tough for the guns, but CCCI Bde got though and eventually came into action within close rifle range of the enemy. C (H) Battery under Lt-Col Thatcher, together with C (H)/CCCII Bty, came up through Qalonye and supported 180th (2/5th London) Brigade's afternoon attack on the heights above Lifta; the hill was carried with great dash at the point of the bayonet. The battery suffered one officer mortally wounded, one man killed and 13 wounded. The division consolidated its gains that evening. The advance was resumed the following morning and the infantry fought their way into the suburbs of Jerusalem; there was little the artillery could do to support them. The Turks evacuated the city and the following morning the mayor and civic leaders surrendered the city to two sergeants of 2/19th Londons.

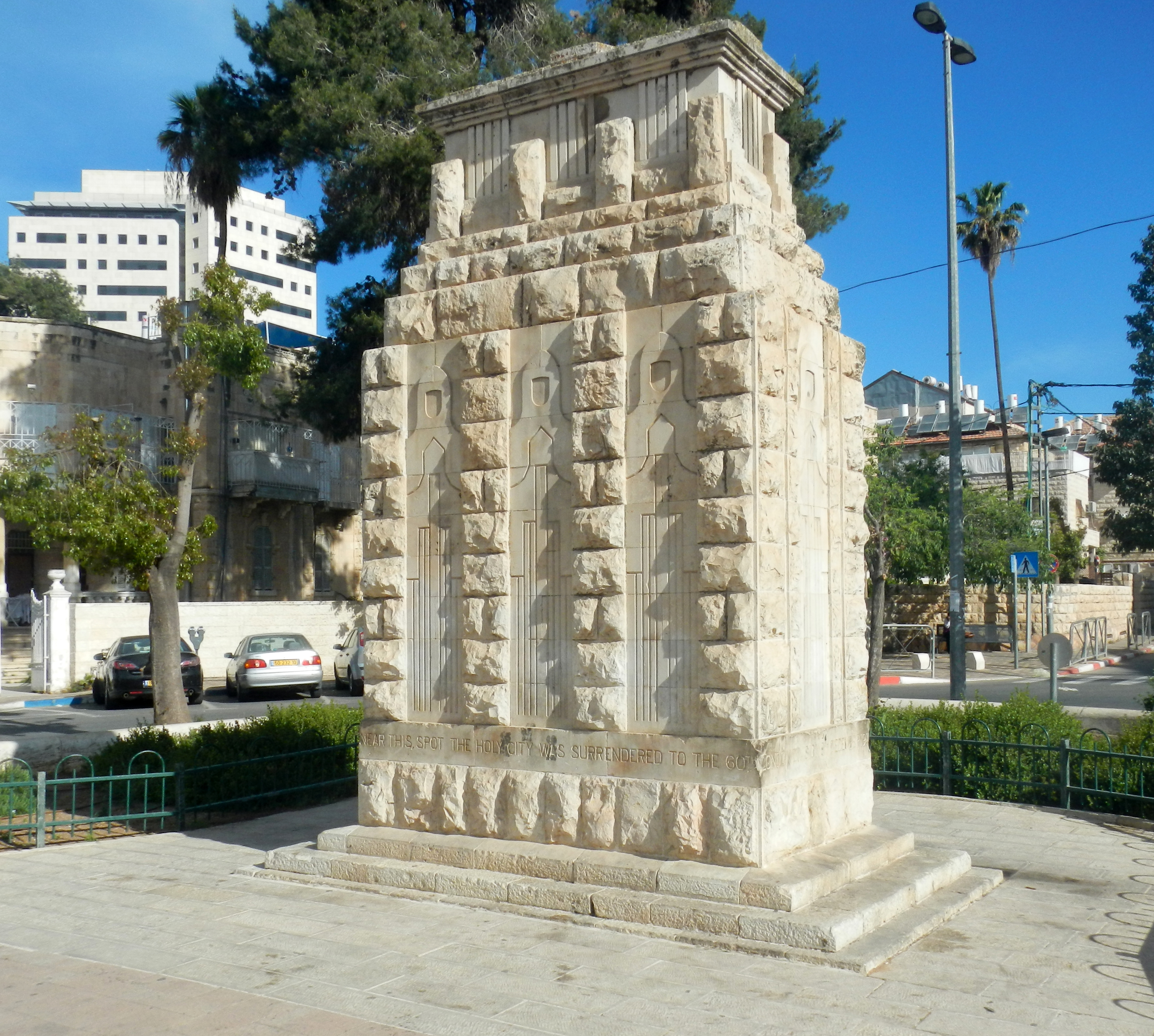
Monument to the surrender of Jerusalem to 60th (2/2nd London) Division

60th (2/2nd L) Division was then pushed forward into positions from which to defend the captured city. Turkish counter-attacks began on 22 December, and a major attack followed on the night of 26/27 December. This was beaten off and the division took the opportunity to push forward up the Nablus Road into the hills over the following days. 60th Divisional Artillery made 'extraordinary exertions' to get its guns up to support attacks that captured the heights of Tahuneh and Shab Salah on 29 December. The Nablus Road defences were then garrisoned by 180th Bde with CCCI Bde in support.

There was a pause in operations until February 1918 when the EEF moved to drive the Turks east of the Jordan. 60th (2/2nd L) Division advanced with three brigade groups, each supported by artillery, and worked its way forward between 14 and 21 February over rough country, after which the supporting Australian 1st Light Horse Brigade swept into Jericho, leaving the Turks with only small bridgeheads west of the Jordan. CCCI Brigade played no part in the Battle of Tell 'Asur that followed. The former B/CCCI Bty, having served with 74th (Y) Division through the campaign from Gaza to Tell 'Asur as A/CCLXVIII, returned to CCCI on 21 March 1918 and resumed its position as B Bty.

60th Division next eliminated the Turkish bridgeheads and then crossed the river on the night of 21 March to carry out the First Transjordan raid. A Pontoon bridge was built at Ghoraniyeh, and the reinforced division advanced as far as Amman, though the field artillery could not get forward in the wet conditions, even with double teams of horses. Without artillery support, the division failed to capture the Amman Citadel, and with its communications back to the Jordan threatened, the raiding force withdrew on 30–31 March. On the morning of 1 April, CCCI Bde, with B/CCCIII Bty attached, took up positions west of the Jordan to cover the last stage of the withdrawal, which was completed next day.

The EEF settled down to defend its Jordan bridgeheads; CCCI Brigade was posted to support the Australian 2nd Light Horse Brigade and Imperial Camel Corps garrisoning a bridgehead at the Wadi el Auja confluence. The Turks attacked the Auja bridgehead on 11 April but were driven off, the artillery observers on the high ground to the west having 'an admirable view'. Later that month, the 60th (2/2nd L) Division played its part in the Second Transjordan raid. CCCI Brigade crossed the river at Ghoraniyeh on 29 April, but while the mounted troops reached Es Salt the Londoners could not break through the Turkish positions in the foothills, and the raiding force was withdrawn on 4 May. 60th (2/2nd L) Division then went into Corps Reserve for a rest.

As a result of the German Spring Offensive and consequent manpower crisis on the Western Front, 60th (2/2nd L) Division was changed between 25 May and 1 August to an Indian Army establishment, releasing three-quarters of its London infantry units for service in France and replacing them with Indian units; however, this did not affect the artillery, which continued to serve with the division in Palestine.

In July, the Abu Tulul salient in the Jordan Valley was garrisoned by the 1st Light Horse Brigade when it was attacked by German troops bolstering the Turks. Among the artillery supporting this sector was C (H)/CCCI Bty. When the Australian unit in the front line heard the sound of movement in front at 01.00 on 14 July, he called down a defensive barrage in front of his position; the enemy artillery also came into action, shelling the whole position. A serious attack came in at 03.30 as the Australians withdrew their outposts, but after a fierce fight the Light Horse recovered their positions and took hundreds of prisoners.

For the final offensive in Palestine, the Battle of Megiddo, 60th Division was transferred to the coastal sector where the breakthrough was to be made. The opening attack (the Battle of Sharon) went in at 04.30 on 19 September behind an intense artillery bombardment. As soon as the barrage programme was complete, the artillery moved up behind the infantry, who had gained their first objectives. 181st Brigade was ordered up from support at 06.15 and by 10.00 was advancing on Umm Sur with the two 18-pdr batteries of CCCI Bde, which had crossed the Nahr el Faliq. It then carried on to reach Tel Subik by 14.00, as the Turks streamed away in retreat. The 60th Division advanced for the next three days against enemy rearguards until it ran ahead of its supplies.

After the battle, the pursuit was carried out by the mounted troops and 60th Division was left behind on salvage duties. It was still in the rear areas when the Armistice of Mudros ended the war with Turkey on 31 October. The division then went back to Alexandria where demobilisation began and units were gradually reduced to cadres, though still with some responsibility for internal security and seizing illegal arms. The division ceased to exist on 31 May 1919.

== Interwar ==
The TF was reconstituted on 7 February 1920 and 6th London Bde, RFA, was reformed at Holland Road, Brixton, though its batteries were now numbered 13th–16th. In 1921 the TF was reorganised as the Territorial Army (TA), and its designations were changed: the unit now became 63rd (6th London) Brigade, RFA, with the following organisation:

- 249 (13th London) Battery
- 250 (14th London) Battery
- 251 (15th London) Battery
- 252 (16th London) Battery (Howitzer)

When the RFA was subsumed into the Royal Artillery on 1 June 1924, its units were redesignated as 'Field Brigades, RA'. In the reformed TA, 63rd (6th London) Field Bde was again part of 47th (2nd London) Division. However, in 1935, most of the division was converted into 1st Anti-Aircraft Division and the remaining London units including 63rd Fd Bde were organised into a single London Division.

When the RA adopted the term 'regiment' instead of the obsolete 'brigade' for a lieutenant-colonel's command, the unit became 63rd (6th London) Field Regiment, RA, on 1 November 1938. However, this was short-lived: by the late 1930s, a need for specialist anti-tank (A/T) artillery had been recognised, and the 63rd Fd Rgt was one of the first batch of TA units converted, becoming 52nd (6th London) Anti-Tank Regiment on 28 November 1938 with the batteries renumbered 205–8. The TA was doubled in size following the Munich Crisis of 1938, with existing units splitting to form duplicates shortly before the outbreak of the Second World War: 62nd Anti-Tank Regiment was formed at Stockwell with 245–8 Btys (it was granted the '6th London' subtitle in 1942).

52nd and 62nd Anti-Tank Rgts were both unattached units in London District. The establishment of an A/T battery at this time was 12 x 2-pounder guns organised in Troops of four guns.

== Second World War ==
=== 52nd (6th London) Anti-Tank Regiment ===
==== Battle of France ====
On the outbreak of war, 52nd A/T Rgt mobilised at Brixton under Lt-Col J.H. Page and then Lt-Col F.H.S. Pownall, and trained at Potters Bar. On 17 November, with a full complement of 48 2-pounder guns it sailed to join 5th Division, which was being assembled in the new British Expeditionary Force (BEF) in France. For the remainder of the war it served in this formation, alongside 91st (4th London) and 92nd (5th London) Fd Rgts.

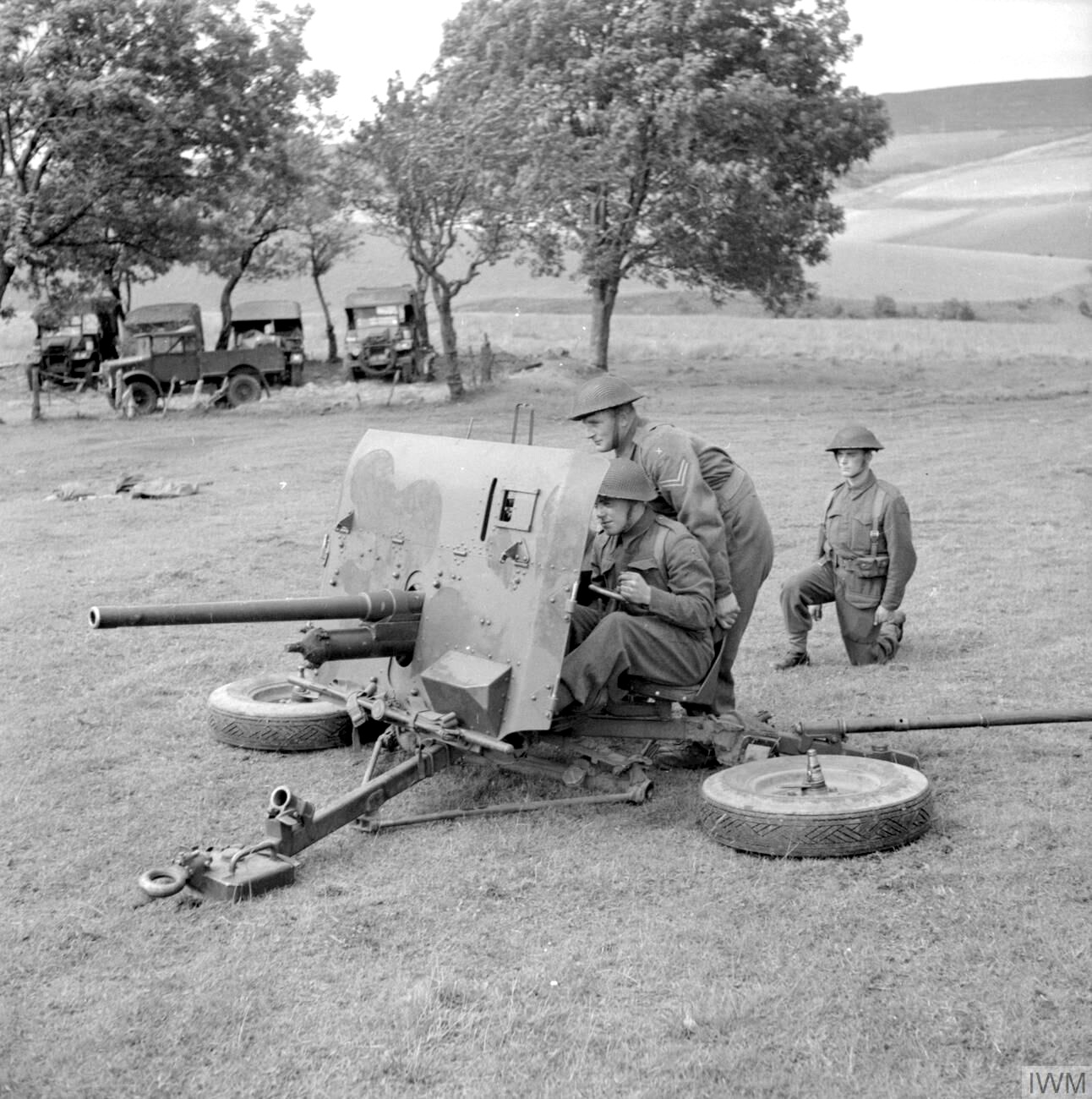
2-Pounder A/T gun in the UK

During the Norwegian Campaign, 5th Division was pulled out of the line and warned for a transfer to Norway, so that when the Battle of France began on 10 May, the division was in reserve. The BEF started its advance north into Belgium to defend the line of the Dyle in accordance with 'Plan D', and 5th Division reached as far as Brussels. But the German Army broke through the Ardennes to the east, forcing the BEF to withdraw again to the line of the Escaut. The anti-tank guns formed part of the rearguards. By 16 May, 52nd A/T Rgt was covering the Hal–Leerbeck road, south west of Brussels, with 205 and 207 Btys detached with 13th and 17th Brigades respectively. By 19 May, they had fallen back to Seclin, then on 20 May to Avion. By now the German breakthrough had cut the BEF off from the French armies. On that day 5th and 50th (Northumbrian) Divisions together with 1st Tank Brigade formed 'Frankforce' (under Maj-Gen H.E. Franklyn of 5th Division) to hold the south-facing salient around Arras. From Avion the regiment was ordered to send 206 and 208 Btys to Arras to join 50th (N) Division for a counter-attack.

Next day, Frankforce attacked the German Panzers moving west past Arras. Two columns were formed, each with a tank battalion, a battalion of the Durham Light Infantry from 50th (N) Division, and artillery from 5th Division; 206 A/T Bty accompanied the Left Column. The armoured thrust made some progress, but ran into strong opposition and was bombed by the Luftwaffe. The attacking columns withdrew at nightfall, but it is now recognised that the Arras counter-attack seriously delayed the German advance.

On 22 May, the Germans began crossing the River Scarpe from the west and by late afternoon on 23 May they were across in strength. At last light, Frankforce was ordered to hold out to the last round, but the situation in Arras was now hopeless and the BEF's commander, Lord Gort, changed the orders at midnight, directing Frankforce to move north out of the salient as quickly as possible. The gunners began a 'nightmare' withdrawal down the only road, which was being used by two divisions. Nevertheless, most of the garrison got away to new defensive positions on the canal between Béthune and La Bassée.

On 26 May, Frankforce was rushed further north to plug a gap in the line left by the retreating Belgian army. 5th Division only arrived at the last minute, with the positions they were to occupy at Ploegsteert south of Ypres already under German shellfire. The commander of II Corps, Lt-Gen Alan Brooke, had little more than artillery to plug the gap, and he deployed much of it himself. He placed additional guns under the command of 5th Division, including some 18-pounders posted to 'thicken up' 52nd A/T Rgt's anti-tank screen. The fire of these guns held up the German advance for the whole day on 27 May (the Battle of the Ypres–Comines Canal), which ended with a bayonet charge by 2nd Bn Cameronians to stabilise the position for the night.

On 26 May, Gort had made the decision to evacuate the BEF from Dunkirk (Operation Dynamo). 5th Division held off the Germans on the canal for another whole day, then slipped away to the Yser on the night of 28/29 May. It was not seriously attacked the following day, and withdrew within the perimeter that night and embarked for England, but guns were required to stay behind to bolster 50th (N) Division's defences for a further 24 hours, and it was not until early on 1 June that the last of 5th Division's gunners destroyed their remaining equipment and were evacuated.

==== Home Defence ====
While reforming after Dunkirk, 5th Division was posted to Scottish Command, and assembled at Huntly Camp, Aberdeenshire. On 29 October 1940, the division moved down to Lancashire to join III Corps in Western Command, where it stayed (except for a spell in Northern Ireland) until 1942. The artillery were re-equipped with whatever guns were available until sufficient 2-pounders were ready.

On 1 November 1940, the 52nd A/T Rgt provided a cadre to help form 73rd A/T Rgt, which later served in North West Europe as XXX Corps' A/T unit. On 23 September 1941, it provided 205 (13th London) Bty to a newly formed 82nd A/T Rgt, which later served in the Far East. 205 Battery was replaced on 1 October by 303 Bty (originally numbered 299 Bty) formed by a cadre within the regiment at Moy, County Tyrone.

==== India and Persia ====
In January 1942, 5th Division passed under direct War Office control preparatory to embarking for India in March. While part of the division was diverted for the invasion of Vichy French-controlled Madagascar, 52nd A/T Rgt and the rest of the division arrived in Bombay on 21 May. After concentrating, the division moved across India to Ranchi, the base area for the Burma Campaign. However, after less than three months in India, 5th Division was diverted again, this time to Persia, which was threatened by the German advance on the Caucasus. The division embarked for Basra and proceeded by road via Baghdad into Persia, where it spent the winter near Teheran. The threat to Persia having been diverted by the Battle of Stalingrad, 5th Division was next earmarked as an assault division for the Allied invasion of Sicily (Operation Husky). It proceeded via Baghdad to Damascus in Syria, where it trained for amphibious landings and mountain warfare. It moved to the Suez Canal zone of Egypt in June, and embarked on 5 July.

==== Sicily ====
The division landed in Sicily on 10 July 1943, and together with 50th Division advanced up the east coast to the plain of Catania, where they ran into stiffer opposition. On 13 July, a Commando and paratroop attack (Operation Fustian) seized Primosole Bridge over the Simeto river and prevented its demolition, but was unable to retain possession of the bridge. 5th Division managed to achieve a limited bridgehead, but it proved impossible to push through until the Germans on the coast were outflanked by other formations and it remained under fire from the foothills until Eighth Army's flanking forces caused a German withdrawal that saw the division 'chasing his troops round the slopes of Mount Etna'. At this stage, 5th Division was withdrawn from the fighting to prepare for the invasion of mainland Italy (Operation Baytown).

==== Italy ====
5th Division landed at Reggio di Calabria on 3 September 1943 and then advanced up the coast road to meet US Fifth Army. There was little opposition apart from demolitions and rearguard actions. Fifth Army then advanced up Italy, with 5th Division in the Apennines where the gunners' training in mountain warfare paid off. The division's advance was halted at Rionero when the Allies were held up at Monte Cassino and a succession of defended river lines.

During this winter stalemate, 5th Division was transferred to the east coast to assist 1st Canadian Division at Ortona and 2nd New Zealand Division at Orsogna. These attacks were only moderately successful, so 5th Division was switched again, back to the west coast to cross the mouth of the Garigliano and outflank Cassino. The division's 'silent' assault crossing (without artillery fire) on the night of 17/18 January 1944 using beach landing techniques was successful in establishing a firm bridgehead that was held against enemy counter-attacks with the support of the guns, but without further troops it was impossible to advance further.

In March, the division was sent to Anzio to relieve another division, and held a section of the line in a trench warfare stalemate that matched the First World War. The war became mobile again after the capture of Cassino in May 1944, and 5th Division followed the retreating Germans as far as the Tiber before it was withdrawn for rest.

==== North West Europe ====
5th Division handed over its guns and equipment to the newly arrived 46th Division and embarked for Egypt. After a period of rest and reorganisation, followed by internal security duties, in Palestine from July 1944 to February 1945, 5th Division was chosen for Operation Goldflake whereby troops from the Mediterranean theatre were transferred to reinforce 21st Army Group fighting in the final stages of the campaign in North West Europe. The division began to arrive at Taranto in Italy in mid-February and then re-embarked at Naples to be shipped to Marseille on 8 March. It was concentrated near Ghent by 19 March.

The division had not re-equipped in time for the Crossing of the Rhine, but took part in a number of actions in the pursuit to the Elbe. After the assault crossing of that river on 29 April, 5th Division passed through the bridgehead to continue the pursuit. By now there was only scattered resistance and thousands of prisoners were collected. Hostilities ended on VE Day.

52nd (6th London) Anti-Tank Regiment served in the occupation forces in Germany (British Army of the Rhine, BAOR) until RHQ and the four batteries were placed in suspended animation on 11 November 1946.

=== 62nd (6th London) Anti-Tank Regiment ===
==== Home Defence ====
On the outbreak of war, the new regiment mobilised at Stockwell and on 7 October 1939 it joined 2nd London Division, which was being reformed as a motor division (it was redesignated 47th (London) Division on 21 November 1940). During the Battle of France, 2nd London Division was classed as a training formation in Eastern Command, responsible for the defence of London itself. After Dunkirk, it moved to South Wales under Western Command, but by February 1941 it was equipped and trained, taking responsibility for the defence of the coast of Sussex.

On 28 July 1941, an additional battery, 294, was formed by a cadre within the regiment at East Grinstead. On 1 October that year, 294 Bty joined 81st A/T Rgt, which served with 1st Division in Tunisia and Italy.

In December 1941, 47th (L) Division was placed on a lower establishment, remaining as a coast defence formation in the Hampshire & Dorset District, but not expected to serve overseas. On 11 August 1942, 247 A/T Bty was disbanded. However, 62nd A/T Rgt left the division on 14 February 1943 and came under War Office Control as a mobile part of the field army, with its own Light Aid Detachment of the Royal Electrical and Mechanical Engineers. Shortly afterwards, it was attached to I Corps in 21st Army Group training for the planned Allied invasion of Normandy (Operation Overlord). 247 Battery was reformed on 25 June 1943. For the next year the regiment was engaged in a series of training exercises, at first in Scotland and later on the South Coast of England, with final rehearsal landings made at Slapton Sands and Studland Bay.

==== D-Day ====
I Corps' 'spearhead' formation sign

For 'Overlord', as Corps anti-tank regiment, 62nd A/T Rgt was equipped with two batteries (246 and 247) of 17-pounder guns towed by turretless Crusader tanks, and two self-propelled (SP) batteries (245 and 248) with US-supplied M10 tank destroyers converted to 17-pdr SP Achilles standard. Each battery comprised three Troops of four guns. On the evening of 5 June 1944, 245 and 246 Btys sailed from Tilbury Docks while 247 and 248 sailed from Southampton. I Corps was to land on two beaches: Sword (3rd British Division) and Juno (3rd Canadian Division). Two batteries (246 and 248) of 62nd A/T Rgt were assigned to support 7th Canadian Infantry Brigade landing on 'Mike' and 'Nan' beaches in Juno sector, while the other two batteries were in reserve for 3rd Canadian Division. The Achilles of 248 Bty's J Troop were directly attached to The Royal Regina Rifles and K Trp to the Royal Winnipeg Rifles, landing either side of Courseulles-sur-Mer. K Troop landed at 15.00, two hours late because of problems with the Rhino ferry on which it was carried, and it was hurried through the beach exits to catch up with the Winnipegs, now 3 miles (4.8 km) inland. By 10.00 the next day, the Winnipegs were on their objective with the four Achilles deployed covering the lanes passing under the embankment of the Caen–Bayeux railway. Later in the day, the Canadians' own 6-pounder A/T guns arrived to take over, and K Trp was withdrawn into reserve. J Troop had landed late in the afternoon of D-Day and pushed forward to Bretteville-l'Orgueilleuse on D+1. When the Canadian guns arrived that evening, the Achilles joined those of newly arrived L Trp to cover 7th Canadian Bde's thinly-held left flank. So far the regiment had not fired a shot.

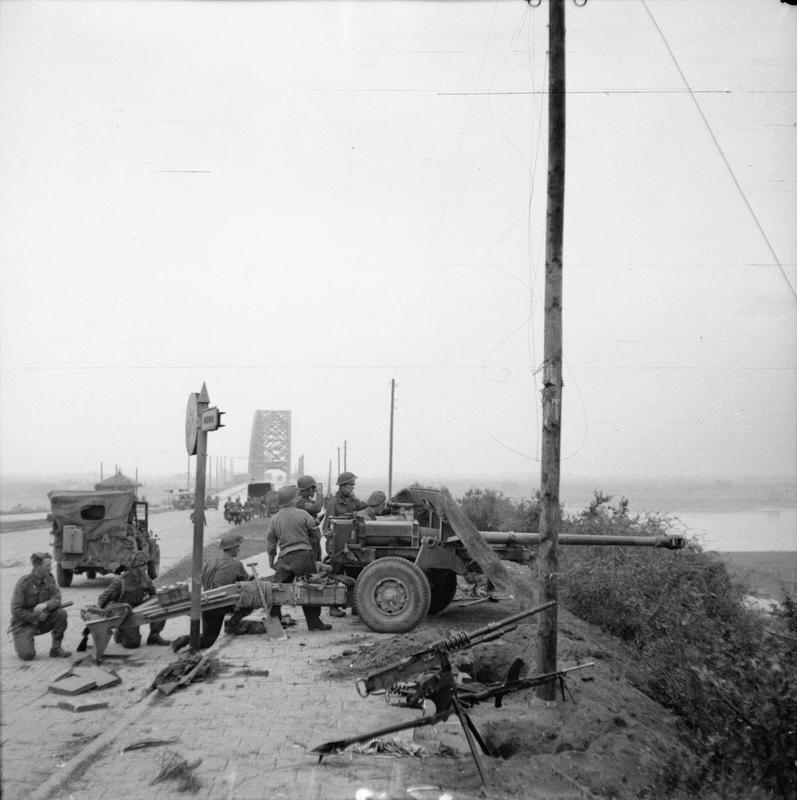
Towed 17-pounder A/T gun in action

246 Battery had arrived off Mike Red beach at 14.00 on D-Day but had been stood off, bombed during the night, and not finally put ashore until 17.30 next day (D+1). When they reached 7th Canadian Bde HQ, F Trp was sent to the long left flank, D Trp into Brettevile, and E Trp to support the Canadian Scottish on the right flank. At about 09.45 on D+2, a force from 12th SS Panzer Division with nine tanks began an attack against the wood held by the Canadian Scottish. Four tanks were knocked out by E Trp's 17-pdrs and the Canadian 6-pdrs, but two of the 17-pdrs were themselves knocked out. The troop commander, Lt Gerry Blanchard, brought up another gun from the rear and reorganised his crews, laying and firing one of the guns himself. Although the position was mortared and shelled, the Germans did not renew the attack. E Troop had suffered four killed, seven wounded and two missing; Lt Blanchard was awarded an MC. On the left, at Putot-en-Bessin, the Winnipegs were being overwhelmed by two Panzergrenadier battalions; at 20.30, the Canadian Scottish with some tanks made a counter-attack in which the four Achilles of K Trp advanced immediately behind the leading infantry companies. After a fierce struggle, Putot was regained, and K Trp's guns were deployed along its forward edge, covering the railway line. During an uneasy night the Achilles crews fired their Browning machine guns to give the Canadians support.

Of the two batteries in divisional reserve, 247 did not get ashore until the afternoon of D+1, when two of its troops were rushed up too late to take part in 9th Canadian Infantry Brigade's first action with 12th SS Panzer Division. It then spent three weeks in the line, shelled and mortared, but not firing a shot. 245 Battery had been even more delayed in landing, and after coming ashore on D+2 was transferred to the eastern sector to support 3rd British and 6th Airborne Division in the bridgehead across the River Orne, where it accounted for four German tanks. On 11 June, the Canadians made a costly attack on Le Mesnil-Patry, which was repulsed. In case the Germans seized the opportunity for a counterattack 248 Battery was rushed up in support, with the troops deployed to Norrey-en-Bessin, Bretteville and Putot, but the expected attack did not materialise. After this, the Canadian sector quietened down for about three weeks. 246 and 247 Batteries remained with 7th and 8th Canadian Infantry Brigades while 248 Bty was transferred to the 3rd British Division, which attacked and captured Chateau de Londe on 27–28 June, where 248 Bty knocked out its first German tank.

On 3 July, elements of 246 and 248 Btys moved south to join the Canadians in Operation Windsor to capture Carpiquet Airfield next day. E and F Troops of 246 Bty supported 8th Canadian Bde, while K Trp of 248 Bty was with the Royal Winnipegs, attached to the brigade. E Troop followed the Régiment de la Chaudière into Carpiquet village, deployed its 17-pdrs along the southern edge, and helped to throw back a counter-attack. The troop remained in these positions under shellfire for the next five days. Meanwhile, K Trp had followed the Winnipegs across open ground towards the airfield, with two Achilles supporting the lead companies, and two back. The infantry repeatedly tried to get onto the airfield, but their attacking armour was drawn back; at one point, the Achilles were alone on the open slope. In the evening the infantry were withdrawn to their start line, covered by K Trp.

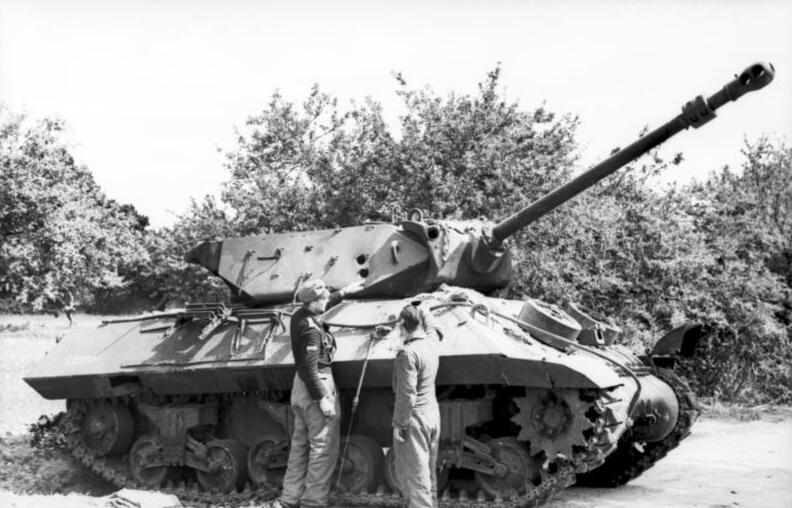
German personnel examine a knocked-out Achilles of 245 Bty after the engagement at Buron

==== Buron ====
Operation Windsor was a preliminary for Operation Charnwood, to capture Caen itself. For this, 245 Bty with its Achilles was brought back from across the Orne in exchange for the towed 17-pdrs of 247 Bty, while 248 Bty supported the newly landed 59th (Staffordshire) Division. At 07.30 on 8 July, A and B Trps of 245 Bty followed the Highland Light Infantry of Canada towards the heavily defended village of Buron, and after the infantry's fierce fight were able to deploy along its forward edge at about 09.00, with A Trp covering the southern and western approaches, and B Trp facing south east. Not long afterwards, enemy shell and mortar fire increased and a battle group of 20–30 Panzer IV and Panther tanks from12th SS Panzer Division launched a counter-attack. As the German tanks moved across in front of its positions, 245 Bty engaged them, destroying 13 for the loss of six Achilles (four of which were later recovered). This was the most celebrated anti-tank action during the campaign, but it cost the two troops two officers and four other ranks dead, and six more wounded. Later in the day the three serviceable guns joined the North Nova Scotia Highlanders as they advanced through Buron to take Authie, and then deployed along the edge of that village. After Buron the battery commander received an MC and two of the gun sergeants were awarded the MM. The battery's other troop had followed the Canadian Scottish Regiment into Cussy and engaged several enemy tanks without success. 248 Battery had been involved in 59th Division's assaults on La Bijude and Épron. Next day elements of 246 and 245 Btys advanced with the Canadians and K Trp of 248 Bty provided support from the flank, but none of their guns came into action while Caen was finally secured.

After the capture of Caen, 62nd A/T Rgt's batteries were widely scattered during the remainder of the Normandy Campaign, supporting various formations. Once 21st Army Group broke out from the Normandy beachhead and began driving eastwards, the regiment continued to serve with I Corps under First Canadian Army in Clearing the Channel Coast. This included the capture of Le Havre (Operation Astonia) and the drive towards Antwerp.

==== Clarkeforce ====
The strategic requirement now was to clear the Scheldt Estuary and get the port of Antwerp into use as an Allied supply base. 49th (West Riding) Division was to attack towards Loenhout, and then unleash a mobile force to exploit the breakthrough and move up the main road to Wuustwezel in Operation Rebound. This mobile force was commanded by Brigadier W.S. Clarke of 34th Tank Brigade and named 'Clarkeforce'. Clarkeforce consisted of Churchill tanks of 107th Regiment Royal Armoured Corps carrying infantry of 1st Bn Leicestershire Regiment, accompanied by a troop of Achilles from 248 Bty, Churchill Crocodile flame-throwing tanks of the 1st Fife and Forfar Yeomanry, 25-pounder field guns of 191st (Hertfordshire & Essex Yeomanry) Field Rgt and sections of the Royal Engineers (RE). Operation Rebound (part of the larger offensive of Operation Pheasant) began on 20 October with the seizure of Stapelheide as a start line for Clarkeforce, which was launched through the gap at 16.00.

The column bypassed some strongpoints to be mopped up by supporting troops, but progress was slow: the route was restricted to one tank's width and the going was bad. A fight for 'Stone Bridge' took most of the remaining daylight, but the bridge was seized before it could be completely demolished and the tanks and infantry pushed on in the dark to clear Wuustwezel. By 22.00, infantry of 49th (WR) Division had moved up to relieve Clarkeforce, which pressed on: 'The night was pitch dark, it was raining, and there was no moon'. Progress was slow and the armoured vehicles had to clear roadblocks of trees. During the second day of the advance, the enemy put in counter-attacks that succeeded briefly in cutting the road at Stone Bridge and isolating the leading troops, but these were beaten off. On 22–24 October Clarkeforce pushed on to Essen.

Clarkeforce rested on 25 October to plan the next phase of its advance towards Roosendaal (Operation Thruster), and 245 Bty was now brought across from Eindhoven, to provide the A/T support. Because the best A/T gun the Churchills had was only the 6-pdr, which was outranged by the 75mm and 88mm guns of the dug-in and camouflaged German SP guns, the Achilles had to do the bulk of the work with their 17-pdrs. They and the Churchills also had to use their A/T guns to destroy concrete obstacles and allow the RE bulldozers to make a massive anti-tank ditch passable. By the end of 26 October, C Trp had lost two M10s and was withdrawn. Next day, a composite troop of three B Trp and two C Trp guns was formed, but two more were lost, and a third on 28 October during an attack on Wouwe covered by smoke and by the guns of the remaining Achilles.

49th (WR) Division found the approaches to Roosendaal strongly held, and a set-piece artillery- and armour-supported assault was laid on. However, a patrol infiltrated the town under cover of mist and found that the Germans had pulled out. The division's final objective was Willemstad on the Hollands Diep (part of the Maas Estuary). This was 10 miles (16 km) away across poor country for armour, so Clarkeforce was disbanded and the division carried out a conventional infantry advance.

After this fighting died down, I Corps held the Maas front through the winter. In December the gunners of 245 Bty were doing duty as infantry along the riverbank. Fears of a German incursion over the river in support of their Ardennes Offensive came to nothing. In January 1945, 245 Bty was stationed at Sint Philipsland, where its SP guns were used as field artillery. On 22 January, a German raid across the river led to the battery's only infantry action, and its last fatal casualties of the campaign. I Corps became an administrative HQ and its units played no part in the Battle of the Reichswald (Operation Veritable) or the assault crossing of the Rhine in early 1945. After VE Day, it became part of BAOR, with 245 Bty crossing into Germany on 4 June.

62nd (6th London) Anti-Tank Regiment with its four batteries passed into suspended animation on 4 February 1946.

== Postwar ==
On 1 January 1947, the regiment was reconstituted at Brixton as 263 (6th London) Anti-Tank Regiment (and 62nd A/T Rgt was formally disbanded). The regiment provided the A/T component of 56th (London) Armoured Division. Subsequently, it was reconverted to a field regiment (1 March 1951), then a self-propelled medium regiment (1 August 1954).

On 31 October 1956, the regiment absorbed the Kent parts of 415 (Thames & Medway) Coast Regiment to become 263 (6th London) Light Regiment. Finally, on 1 May 1961, it was amalgamated with 291 (4th London) Field Regiment, 298 (Surrey Yeomanry) Field Regiment and 381 (Surrey) Light Regiment to form 263 (Surrey Yeomanry (Queen Mary's Regiment)) Field Regiment. The old 263 Rgt provided RHQ at Sutton in the new combined regiment, while the Sheerness and Gravesend batteries, originally from 415 (Thames & Medway) Coast Rgt, were converted into Royal Engineers as part of 211 (Thames & Medway) Field Squadron.

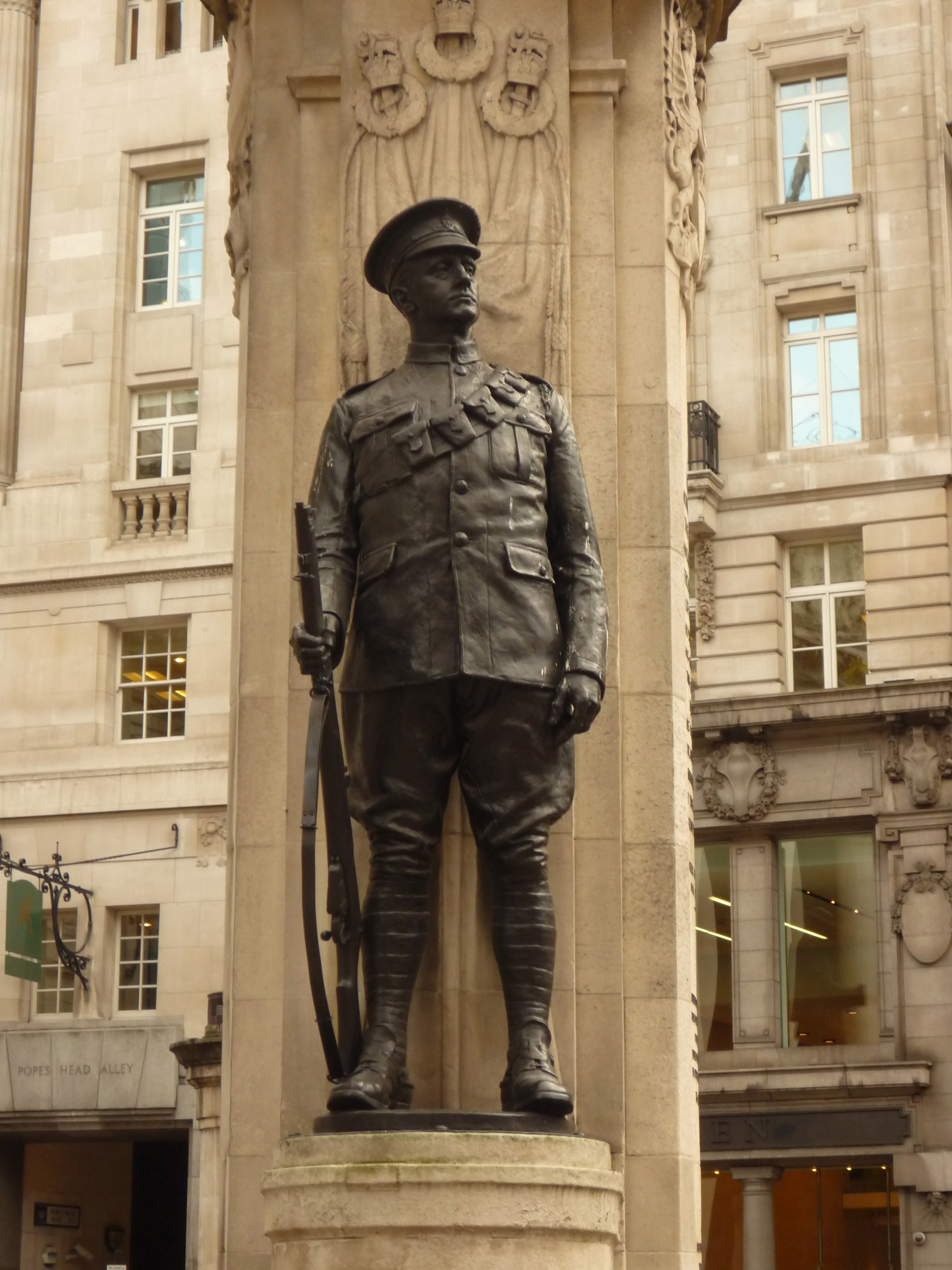
The artillery figure on the London Troops Memorial

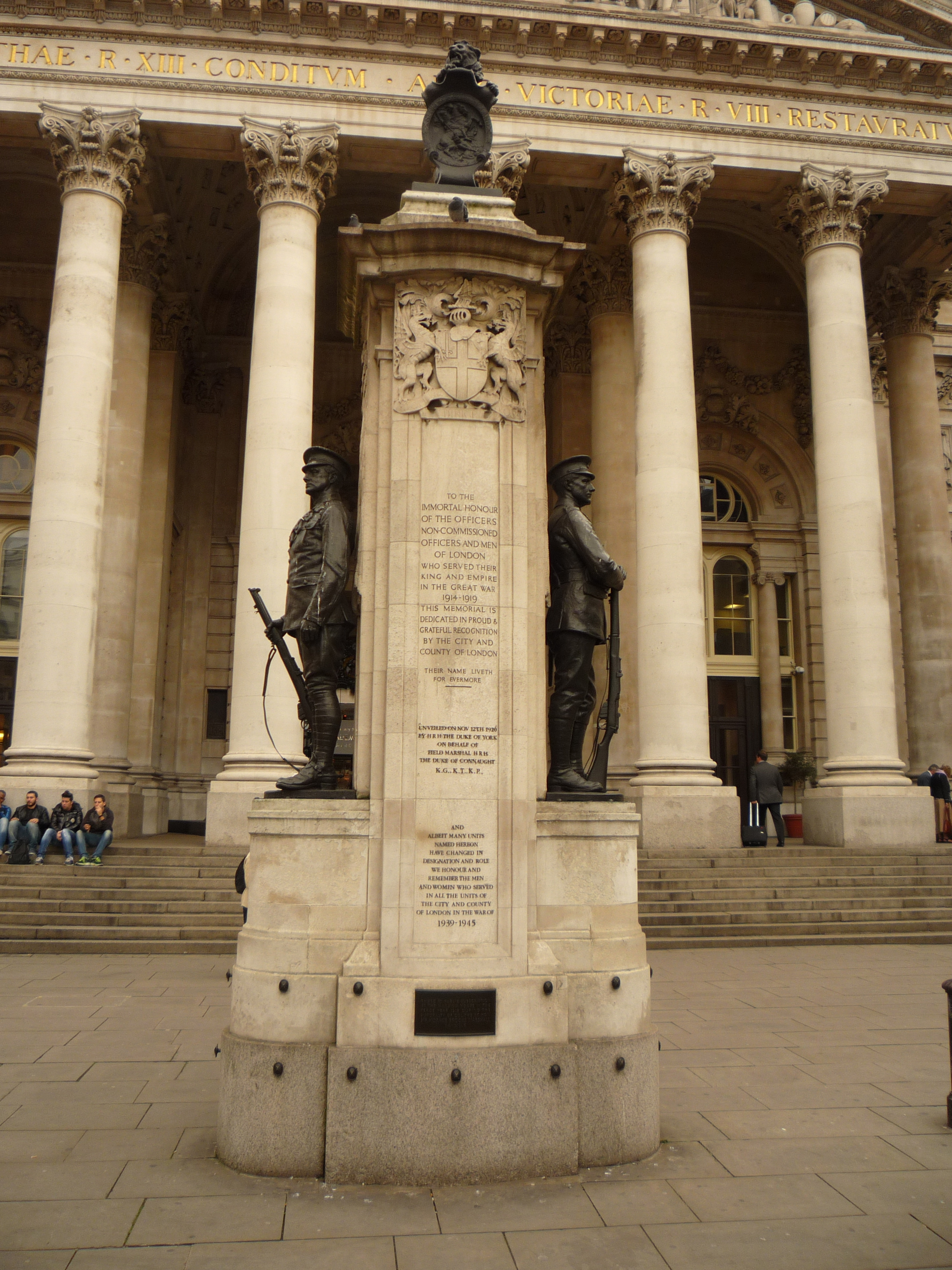
London Troops Memorial in 2013

== Insignia ==
Officers of the 2nd Surrey Artillery wore a pouch belt plate consisting of a circlet inscribed 'SECOND SURREY ARTILLERY COMPANY' surrounding a gilt 'bomb' with silver 'VR' cipher on the ball, the whole surrounded by a wreath of rose, thistle and shamrock and surmounted by a crown.

== Honorary Colonels ==
The following served as Honorary Colonel of the unit:

1st Surrey AVC

- Francis, Duke of Teck, GCB, appointed 15 June 1867 (became supernumerary Hon Col of the 1st City of London AVC on amalgamation)

6th Londons

- Reginald Brett, 2nd Viscount Esher, GCB, GCVO, appointed 1 June 1910
- Col Sir Sidney Wishart, VD, TD, former CO
- Col W. Cooper, OBE, MC, TD, former CO, appointed 1 October 1928, continued with 52nd A/T Rgt

== Memorials ==
6th County of London Brigade, RFA, is listed on the City and County of London Troops Memorial in front of the Royal Exchange, with architectural design by Sir Aston Webb and sculpture by Alfred Drury. The left-hand (northern) figure flanking this memorial depicts a Royal Artilleryman representative of the various London Artillery units.

Two wooden memorial crosses erected at High Wood and Eaucourt L'Abbaye by 47th (2nd London) Division in 1916 were replaced in stone in 1925. The restored wooden crosses were preserved at the Duke of York's Headquarters in Chelsea (the former divisional HQ), and are now at Connaught House, the HQ of the London Irish Rifles in Camberwell.

== Online sources ==
- British Army units from 1945 on
- Canadian Military History
- Imperial War Museum, War Memorials Register
- The Long, Long Trail
- Land Forces of Britain, the Empire and Commonwealth
- Royal Artillery 1939–1945
- Stepping Forward: A Tribute to the Volunteer Military Reservists and Supporting Auxiliaries of Greater London
- Graham Watson, The Territorial Army 1947
