= James Whitton =

English architect and surveyor

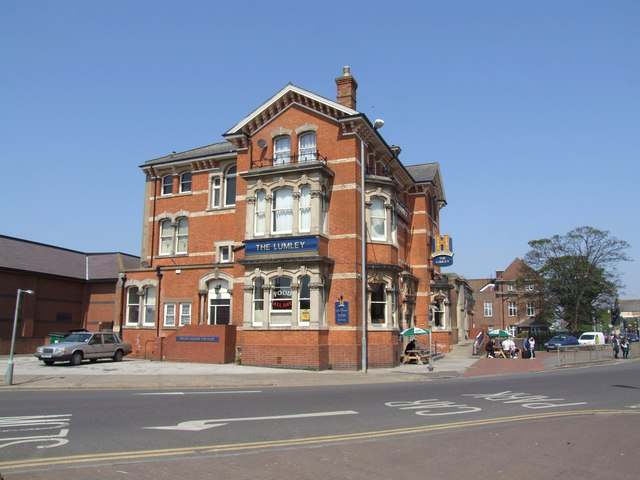
- The Lumley, Skegness 1878
- Born: c.1819
- Died: 2 February 1903; Poulton-le-Fylde
- Occupation: Architect
- Buildings: The Turkish Swimming Baths, Skegness
- Projects: The design and layout of Skegness 1878-80 for the Earl of Scarbrough.

James Whitton was an architect and surveyor who worked in Lincoln, Lincolnshire from about 1846 to 1886. His most notable project was the design and layout of Skegness as a holiday resort for Richard Lumley, 9th Earl of Scarbrough.

== Career ==
James Whitton started work around 1846 for the Lincoln architect William Adams Nicholson and after Nicholson's death in 1853 he continued to work for Michael Drury. In 1863 he set up his own practice at 27 Monks’ Road, Lincoln, when he described himself as Architect, Surveyor and House Agent. Later that year he moved the business to 22 Silver Street, Lincoln, where he remained until moving to 22, Newland Lincoln. By 1880 he was at 7 Tentercroft Street, Lincoln and in 1886 he retired and sold the contents of his house by auction. He died, aged 84, at Poulton-le-Fylde in Lancashire on 2 February 1903.

Initially most of Whitton's work was in Lincoln and between 1866 and 1882, he submitted forty applications for the construction of new buildings to the City of Lincoln Council. His business seems to have taken off after 1878 when he started supervising of the construction work required for the new resort of Skegness and during the following years he was occupied by the design and contraction of many of the new buildings. Apart from working in Lincoln and Skegness, he is also known to have been the architect for the parsonage at Stallingborough in Lincolnshire and a farmhouse and farm cottages in Hanslope in Buckinghamshire. His buildings were in a High Victorian style, sometimes using decorative Minton tiles on the frontages of the houses he designed.

== Design and layout of Skegness ==
Skegness started to develop as holiday resort after the opening of Skegness station on 28 July 1873. In 1876 Richard Lumley, 9th Earl of Scarbrough commissioned George Booth Walker, a surveyor from Wainfleet to produce an initial plan for the resort. The resort then appears to have been developed by Whitton on a grid plan to the north of the high street and to the north east of the railway station with the sea to the east.

== Lincolnshire Agricultural Society ==
It appears that the Lincolnshire Show was designed and laid out by James Whitton in the 1870s and early 1880s.

== Architectural work ==
- Stallingborough Parsonage, Lincolnshire. 1882
- 16 & 18 The Avenue, Lincoln.
- 47-50 South Park, Lincoln. Two pairs of semi-detached houses, built for Henry Newsum.
- 61 Steep Hill, Lincoln.
- Reading Room and Library - later Nat West Bank, Skegness.
- Skegness Waterworks.
- Skegness Cricket Ground and Pavilion.
- National School, Burgh Road. A school for 260 children and master's house Skegness designed by Whitton and built by James Dunkley in 1879.
- A house and two farmsteads, at Hanslope, Buckinghamshire 1880.
- 14-15 Sincil Street, Lincoln,(1880) Coop Pharmacy and Imp Travel. Belonged to the Trustees of the Lincoln Unitarian Church. Slate roof, three storeys with five bays and ?entrance passage on south side. Red brick with polychrome black and yellow stringing. Two shop frontages
- Skegness Turkish, Hot, Cold & Swimming Baths, Scarbrough Avenue. Built for the Skegness Turkish Hot & Cold Swimming Baths Company Limited 1882. Included two swimming baths for which salt water was pumped from the sea. The baths were hit by bombing in World War ii and demolished in the 1950s.
- Poppleton's sugar-boiling and confectionery works, Beevor Street, Lincoln 1884.

== Literature. ==
Kime, W. (1986), The Book of Skegness, Ingoldmells, Addlethorpe and Chapel St Leonards, Barracuda Books, Buckingham. Robinson, D.N. (1983) The Book of the Lincolnshire Seaside p. 66.
