= Listed buildings in Kinnerley =

Kinnerley is a civil parish in Shropshire, England. It contains 29 listed buildings that are recorded in the National Heritage List for England. Of these, one is at Grade II*, the middle of the three grades, and the others are at Grade II, the lowest grade. The parish contains the village of Kinnerley and smaller settlements, and is mainly rural. Most of the listed buildings are houses, cottages, farmhouses and farm buildings, many of which are timber framed. The other listed buildings include a church and items in the churchyard, a public house, a small country house, and a bridge.

== Key ==
Grade	Criteria
II*	Particularly important buildings of more than special interest
II	Buildings of national importance and special interest

== Buildings ==
Name and location	Photograph	Date	Notes	Grade
Font; 52.78193°N 2.98280°W	—	12th century (probable)	The font is in the churchyard of St Mary's Church. It consists of a crudely carved octagonal tub with a hole in the basin. There is zig-zag decoration on the base and a Greek palindromic inscription on the rim.	II
Cross Keys Public House; 52.78209°N 2.98333°W		14th or 15th century	The public house was extended to the west in the 18th century and to the south in the 19th century. The original part is timber framed with cruck construction and encased in brick with a gabled roof. The later part is in red brick with stone dressings, a band, and a hipped slate roof. The original part contains casement windows. The later part projects to the left, it has two storeys and three bays, the left bay projecting further. The windows in this part are sashes. Inside the original part are three cruck trusses.	II
Churchyard cross 52.78184°N 2.98253°W	—	15th century (probable)	The remains of the cross are in the churchyard of St Mary's Church. These are in sandstone, and consist of an octagonal shaft on a square chamfered base on three octagonal steps, On the top is a brass sundial with an inscription and the date 1828.	II
Llwyn-y-go Farmhouse; 52.78312°N 3.01979°W	—	Late 15th century	A farmhouse, later a private house, it was remodelled in the 17th century and extensively altered in the late 20th century. The house is basically timber framed with cruck construction and rendered infill, and with a tile roof, half-hipped to the right. There are two storeys and three bays, the central bay gabled. On the front is a gabled porch, most of the windows are casements, with some mullioned windows, and there are two gabled eaves dormers. Inside is an inglenook fireplace and four cruck trusses.	II
Cae Howell; 52.75021°N 2.96639°W		Late 16th century	A farmhouse that was altered and extended in the 19th century. The original part is timber framed with rendered and painted brick infill, the later parts are in purple brick, and the roof is slated. There are two storeys and an attic, and the timber framing is only exposed on the right gable end. The upper floor and attic of the gable are jettied with chamfered and moulded bressumers, and it contains two mullioned and transomed windows and a Tudor arched attic window. On the front is a gabled two-storey porch, and the windows on the front are casements.	II
St Mary's Church; 52.78200°N 2.98257°W		c. 1600	The oldest part of the church is the tower, the nave and chancel date from 1773–74 and were designed by Thomas Farnolls Pritchard, the tower was restored in 1862, and the church was restored in 1887–90 when the porch was also added. The church is built in sandstone with slate roof, and consists of a nave, a south porch, a chancel with an apse, and a west tower. The tower has three stages, diagonal buttresses, an embattled parapet, and a pyramidal cap with a brass weathercock. The tower is in Perpendicular style with a Decorated top stage, and the body of the church is Georgian.	II*
Maesbrook Farmhouse; 52.78323°N 3.02533°W	—	Early 17th century	The farmhouse, later a private house, was largely rebuilt in the 18th century, and there were later alterations. It is in brick, largely replacing timber framing, and has a slate roof with a crow-stepped right gable. There are two storeys and an attic, an L-shaped plan, and a gabled porch on the front. The windows are casements, those in the ground floor with segmental heads, and there is a flat-roofed dormer.	II
The Wood; 52.78926°N 3.02792°W	—	Early 17th century	A timber framed farmhouse with pebbledashed infill on a pebbledashed plinth with a slate roof. There are two storeys and three bays. On the front is a gabled porch, and the windows are casements.	II
White House; 52.77706°N 2.96068°W	—	Mid to late 17th century	A timber framed house with brick infill, partly on a sandstone plinth, and with a slate roof. There is one storey and an attic, and three bays. On the front is an open gabled porch, the windows are casements, and there are three gabled eaves dormers with weatherboarding. Inside is an inglenook fireplace.	II
Barn south of The Firs; 52.75546°N 2.95206°W	—	Late 17th century	The barn is timber framed with red brick infill and some rebuilding. It has corrugated iron cladding on the right, and a corrugated iron roof. The barn contains stable doors and a fixed-light window.	II
Cottage at N.G.R. SJ 3549 1770; 52.75308°N 2.95729°W	—	Late 17th century	The cottage is timber framed with red brick infill and an asbestos sheet roof. It has one storey and an attic, and two bays. The windows are casements.	II
Farm Hall; 52.77322°N 2.98280°W	—	Late 17th century	A farmhouse that possibly incorporates a 16th-century timber framed core. It is in brick, partly rendered, with quoins and a slate roof. There are two storeys, a gabled porch on the front, and casement windows, those in the ground floor with segmental heads. Inside is an inglenook fireplace.	II
Oak Cottage; 52.77894°N 2.96492°W	—	Late 17th century	A farmhouse, later a private house, it is timber framed with brick infill, the left gable end is in sandstone, and the roof is slated. It has two bays, a 19th-century former cowhouse to the right, and a later brick outbuilding to the left. The doorway has a bracketed gabled hood, the windows are casements, and there is a gabled eaves dormer with slate-hung sides.	II
Old Court; 52.78578°N 2.97554°W	—	Late 17th century	A house in red brick, possibly encasing or replacing earlier timber framing, and with a slate roof. There are two storeys and an attic, and an L-shaped plan, consisting of a two-bay range and a gabled projecting cross-wing to the left. The windows are casements, and there is a gabled eaves dormer. Inside are timber framed partitions.	II
Red House; 52.75299°N 2.94775°W	—	Late 17th century	A malthouse was added to the left of the house in the 19th century. The house is in red brick on a chamfered red sandstone plinth, the malthouse is in sandstone, and the roofs are slated. The house has two storeys and an attic, string courses, and the windows in both parts are casements with segmental heads.	II
Outbuilding southeast of White House; 52.77696°N 2.96056°W	—	Late 17th century	An agricultural building, it is timber framed with red brick infill, some weatherboarding, and a corrugated iron roof. The building has an L-shaped plan, with a doorway in the angle.	II
Burnt House; 52.76822°N 2.97532°W	—	Late 17th or early 18th century	The cottage was extended in the 20th century. It is in red brick with dentilled bands and a slate roof. There is one storey and an attic, one bay with a shaped gable, and a later extension to the right. In the left return is a flat-roofed porch, and the windows are casements.	II
The Laurels; 52.77686°N 2.96017°W	—	Late 17th or early 18th century	A farmhouse that was remodelled in the 19th century and altered in the 20th century, it is mainly in red brick on a sandstone plinth, with timber framing and purple brick infill at the rear. The roof is slated, there are two storeys and four bays. The windows are sashes, and there is a doorway with a pilastered surround.	II
Wern-las; 52.77276°N 3.01236°W	—	Late 17th or early 18th century (probable)	The farmhouse is in brick on a stone plinth, and has a dentil eaves cornice and a slate roof. There is an L-shaped plan, consisting of a hall range with two storeys, and a gabled cross-wing with two storeys and an attic. The windows are casements, and there is a lean-to porch.	II
Little Dyffrydd; 52.77311°N 3.04498°W	—	1713	A farmhouse in red brick with a slate roof. It has two storeys, and a T-shaped plan consisting of a hall range and a cross-wing. There is a sash window in the hail range, and the other windows are casements. On the front gable of the cross-wing is a datestone with a triangular armorial shield.	II
Farm buildings, Pentreheylin Hall; 52.76886°N 3.02967°W	—	Mid 18th century	The buildings are grouped around the farmyard, and include two barns, a horse engine house, pigsties, cowhouses, and a linhay. They are mainly in brick with some timber framing and weatherboarding, and some limestone, and have roofs of slate and corrugated iron. The cowhouse facing the road contains a vehicle entrance.	II
Rushy Leasowes; 52.94611°N 2.94611°W	—	1753	A small farmhouse in brick with a slate roof, one storey and an attic, two bays, and a rear outshut. Above the door is a gabled hood, the windows are casements, and there are gabled eaves dormers.	II
Pentreheylin Hall; 52.76867°N 3.02933°W	—	Mid to late 18th century	A farmhouse, later a private house that was extended in the 20th century. It is in red brick with chamfered quoins, bands, a moulded eaves cornice, and a slate roof with coped verges. There are three storeys, three bays, and a single-storey extension to the left. The central doorway has a reeded surround with semicircular capitals, and a rectangular fanlight with a fan-like carving above. The windows are sashes, and in the extension is a Venetian window with reeded pilasters.	II
Pentre-uchaf Hall, service ranges, outbuildings and walls 52.78500°N 3.05211°W	—	Mid to late 18th century	A small country house, it was extended by the addition of a service range in the 19th century, linking it to an 18th-century stable range at right angles, resulting in an L-shaped plan. The house is in red brick on a plinth, with quoins, a moulded eaves cornice, and a slate roof. There are three storeys, three bays, and sash windows with wedge lintels. The central entrance has fluted pilasters, a rectangular fanlight, and a moulded flat hood, and is flanked by canted bay windows. The former service range has casement windows and hip roofed dormers. The stable is partly in brick, and partly timber framed. A wall at the rear ends in a tower-like structure with a pyramidal roof.	II
Great Dyffrydd; 52.77129°N 3.04425°W	—	Late 18th century	A farmhouse that is in brick at the front and timber framed with brick infill at the rear, and with a slate roof. There are two storeys and an attic, and an L-shaped plan, with a three-bay main range, a short rear on the right, and a lean-to in the angle. The doorway, which is at the rear, has pilasters and a rectangular fanlight, and the windows are sashes.	II
Kynaston Farmhouse; 52.77652°N 2.96041°W	—	1798	The farmhouse, later a private house, is in red brick on a chamfered sandstone plinth, and has a dentil eaves cornice and a slate roof. There are three storeys, and an L-shaped plan, with a main block of three bays, the middle bay projecting slightly and with a pediment containing a blind arch in the tympanum, and a lower wing at the left at the rear. The central doorway has pilasters, a semicircular fanlight, and an open pediment on brackets. The windows are sashes with stone wedge lintels and projecting keystones.	II
Lane End; 52.77904°N 2.96550°W	—	Late 18th or early 19th century	Originally a squatter's cottage, it is timber framed with brick infill on a brick plinth and with a slate roof. There is one storey, one bay, and a lean-to on the front. The doorway and casement windows have segmental heads.	II
Barn northwest of Pentreheylin Hall; 52.76916°N 3.02982°W	—	Early to mid 19th century	The Dutch barn is in red brick with a slate roof, and has a dentilled eaves cornice open to the roof. On the sides are three segmental arches, there are round-headed arches in the gable ends and semicircular owl holes above.	II
Pont Fadoc; 52.78283°N 3.04988°W	—	1836	The bridge carries the B4398 road over the River Morda, and was designed by Edward Haycock. It is in limestone, and consists of s single segmental arch. The bridge has rusticated voussoirs, projecting keystones, a flat string course, and a plain parapet with rectangular end piers. On each side is s circular drain culvert.	II
