= George Bridgeman, 4th Earl of Bradford =

British soldier and peer (1845–1915)

The Right Honourable The Earl of Bradford
- Earl of Bradford
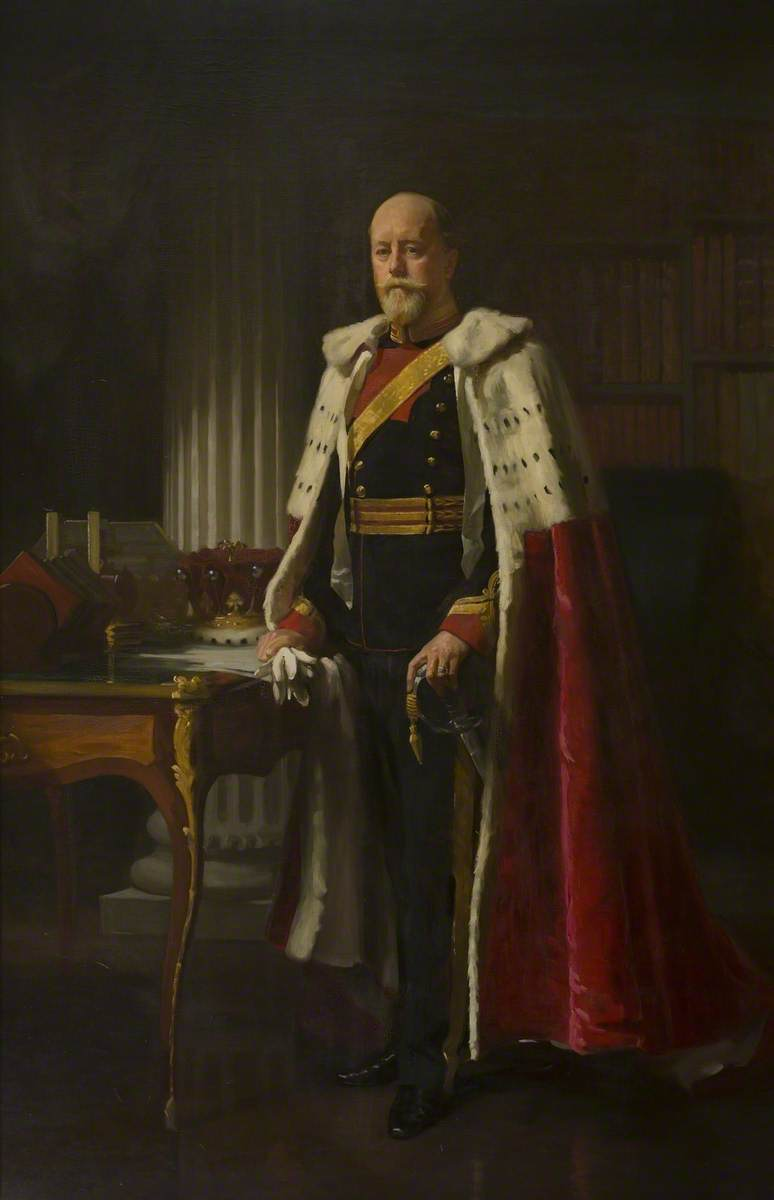
- The Earl of Bradford in 1902
- Born: George Cecil Orlando Bridgeman; 3 February 1845; Belgravia, London
- Died: 2 January 1915 (aged 69); London, England
- Spouse: Lady Ida Annabella Frances Lumley (m. 1869)
- Issue: 7
- Parents: Orlando Bridgeman, 3rd Earl of Bradford; The Hon. Selina Louisa Weld-Forester

George Cecil Orlando Bridgeman, 4th Earl of Bradford JP DL (3 February 1845 – 2 January 1915), styled Viscount Newport from 1865 to 1898, was a British soldier, Conservative politician and peer. He was the grandfather of Princess Alice, Duchess of Gloucester.

== Early life and education ==
Bridgeman was born at his family home in Belgrave Square, London, the elder son of the 3rd Earl of Bradford and the Hon. Selina Louisa Forester. He was educated at Harrow School.

== Career ==
Bridgeman served in the 1st Life Guards and the Shropshire Yeomanry, reaching the rank of Captain. He succeeded his father in his titles on 9 March 1898.

Bridgeman was Member of Parliament (MP) for North Shropshire from 1867 to 1885. When the new seat of Newport, Shropshire was created out of that seat for the 1885 general election, he stood as the Conservative candidate for it but lost by a majority of 361 votes against the winning Liberal, Robert Bickersteth. He was Deputy Lieutenant of Warwickshire and Shropshire, as well as Justice of Peace for Staffordshire, Warwickshire and Shropshire.

== Family ==
On 7 September 1869, the then-Viscount Newport, married his second cousin once-removed, Lady Ida Lumley (28 November 1848 – 22 August 1936), daughter of Richard Lumley, 9th Earl of Scarbrough (7 May 1813 – 5 December 1884), and Frederica Mary Adeliza Drummond (16 December 1826 – 2 April 1907) in Maltby, Yorkshire. They had seven children:

- Lady Beatrice Adine Bridgeman (2 December 1870 – 27 June 1952), married on 28 June 1894 to Colonel Rt. Hon. Ernest George Pretyman (13 November 1859 – 26 November 1931) and had issue.
- Lady Margaret Alice Bridgeman (20 January 1872 – 7 August 1954), married John Montagu-Douglas-Scott, 7th Duke of Buccleuch, on 30 January 1893 and had issue, one such being Princess Alice, Duchess of Gloucester.
- Orlando Bridgeman, 5th Earl of Bradford (6 October 1873 – 21 March 1957).
- Lady Helena Mary Bridgeman (16 July 1875 – 27 August 1947), married Osbert Molyneux, 6th Earl of Sefton, on 8 January 1898 and had issue.
- Lady Florence Sibell Bridgeman (24 March 1877 – 16 June 1936), married Ronald Collet Norman, son of Frederick Henry Norman, on 10 February 1904 and had issue.
- Commander The Hon. Richard Orlando Beaconsfield Bridgeman (28 February 1879 – 9 January 1917), who was awarded the Distinguished Service Order and died in East Africa after the plane in which he was flying as observer, with Sqdn. Cdr. Edwin Rowland Moon as pilot, was forced to land with engine trouble. He was buried in Dar Es Salaam CWGC Cemetery.
- Lieutenant-Colonel The Hon. Henry Bridgeman (15 August 1882 – 19 May 1972), married on 30 December 1930 to Joan Constable-Maxwell (22 March 1901 – 1991) and had issue.

The Countess of Bradford was a Lady of the Bedchamber to the Princess of Wales (later Queen Mary) from 1901.

He died in London, and was buried in Weston Park, Staffordshire, on 6 January 1915.

== Arms ==
Coat of arms of George Bridgeman, 4th Earl of Bradford
Coronet That of a earl. Crest A demi-lion rampant argent holding between the paws a wreath of laurel proper. Escutcheon Sable, ten plates, four, three, two, and one, on a chief argent a lion passant ermines. Supporters Two leopards, guardant gules pelletée. Motto Nec temere, nec I timide (Neither rashley nor timidly).

== Notes ==
Parliament of the United Kingdom
Preceded by John Ormsby-Gore; Adelbert Brownlow-Cust	Member of Parliament for North Shropshire; 1867–1885; With: John Ormsby-Gore 1867–1876; Stanley Leighton 1876–1885	Constituency abolished
Peerage of the United Kingdom
Preceded by Orlando Bridgeman	Earl of Bradford; 2nd creation 1898–1915	Succeeded by Orlando Bridgeman
