= Richard Lumley, 9th Earl of Scarbrough =

Anglo-Irish peer and soldier

The coat of arms of the earls of Scarbrough

Lieutenant-Colonel Richard George Lumley, 9th Earl of Scarbrough (7 May 1813 – 5 December 1884) was an Anglo-Irish peer and soldier.

== Biography ==
He was born at Tickhill Castle, the son and heir of Frederick Lumley-Saville (1788–1837), the only son of the fifth son of the fourth Earl of Scarbrough. His mother, Charlotte Mary (née de la Poer Beresford), was the daughter of Rev. George Beresford, grandson of Marcus Beresford, 1st Earl of Tyrone.

Educated at Eton College, he entered the army as a Cornet in the Hussars, and retired in 1837 as a Lieutenant-Colonel in the West Yorkshire Yeoman Cavalry. After retirement he entered politics as and sat in the House of Lords until he inherited the family titles in October 1856.

Lumley's predecessor, John Lumley-Savile, 8th Earl of Scarbrough, died without legitimate children. Lumley inherited the earldom of Scarbrough and barony of Lumley although he was only the first cousin once removed from the eighth earl. He also inherited the Viscountcy of Waterford in the Peerage of Ireland.

Scarbrough added considerably to the family seat of Sandbeck Park in Yorkshire, which dated to the 17th century. In 1857, he hired William Burn to remodel and improve the house. In 1869, Benjamin Ferrey built a private chapel for the earl.

In 1878 the Earl engaged the architect James Whitton to design and layout a holiday resort on his estate at Skegness.

== Family ==
In October 1846, he married Frederica Mary Adeliza Drummond, granddaughter of the fifth Duke of Rutland; she outlived Lumley, dying in 1907.

They had three sons and four daughters. All four of his daughters married peers:

- Lady Algitha Frederica Mary (23 November 1847 – 22 June 1919), married William Orde-Powlett, 4th Baron Bolton
- Lady Ida Frances Annabella (born 28 November 1848 – 22 August 1936), married George Bridgeman, 4th Earl of Bradford
- Lyulph Richard Grandby William, Viscount Lumley (7 June 1850 – 23 August 1868)
- Lady Lilian Selina Elizabeth (20 October 1851 – 24 December 1943) married Lawrence Dundas, 1st Marquess of Zetland
- Lady Sibell Mary (25 March 1855 – 4 February 1929); married: firstly, Victor Grosvenor, Earl Grosvenor (28 April 1853 – 22 January 1884), with whom she had Hugh Grosvenor, 2nd Duke of Westminster; secondly George Wyndham MP, Chief Secretary for Ireland
- Aldred Frederick George Beresford; later Viscount Lumley (16 November 1857 – 4 March 1945); married Cecilia Gardner
- Col. Osbert Victor George Atheling (16 November 1857 – 14 December 1923), married Constance Ellinor Wilson-Patten (1864-1933), granddaughter of John Wilson-Patten, 1st Baron Winmarleigh; father of the 11th Earl

Scarbrough died at Sandbeck Park at age 71 and was succeeded in the earldom by his eldest surviving son.

Peerage of England
Preceded by John Lumley-Savile	Earl of Scarbrough; 1856–1884	Succeeded by Aldred Lumley
