= Newport =

Newport most commonly refers to:

- Newport, Wales
- Newport, Rhode Island, US

Newport or New Port may also refer to:

== Places ==
=== Australia ===
- Newport, New South Wales
- Newport, Queensland
- New Port, South Australia
- Newport, Victoria

=== Canada ===
- Newport, Newfoundland and Labrador
- Newport, Nova Scotia
- Newport, Ontario
- Newport, Quebec, in Le Haut-Saint-François Regional County Municipality
- Newport, Chandler, Quebec
- Camp Newport, a Salvation Army camp in Muskoka, Ontario

=== Ireland ===
- Newport, County Mayo, a town
- Newport, County Tipperary, a town

=== United Kingdom ===
==== England ====
- Newport, Cornwall
  - Newport (Cornwall) (UK Parliament constituency)
- Newport, Devon, in Barnstaple
- Newport, East Riding of Yorkshire
- Newport, Essex
- Newport, Gloucestershire
- Newport, Isle of Wight
  - Newport (Isle of Wight) (UK Parliament constituency)
  - Newport and Carisbrooke, a civil parish formerly called just "Newport"
- Newport, Lincoln
- Newport, Shropshire
  - Newport Rural District
  - Newport (Shropshire) (UK Parliament constituency)
- Newport, Somerset, a hamlet in the parish of North Curry
- Newport, Dorset, in Bloxworth
- Newport, Norfolk, in Hemsby
- Newport, Middlesbrough, an urban area and ward in Middlesbrough, North Yorkshire
- Newport Hundred, Buckinghamshire, a defunct hundred

==== Scotland ====
- Newport, Caithness, a small hamlet
- Newport-on-Tay, Fife

==== Wales ====
- Newport, Wales, a city and county borough in South Wales
  - Newport City Council
  - District of Newport, 1974–1996 (defunct)
  - Newport (Monmouthshire) (UK Parliament constituency), 1918–1983
- Newport, Pembrokeshire, West Wales

=== United States ===
- Newport, Arkansas
- Newport, California
- Newport, Delaware
- Newport, Florida
- Newport, Georgia; see List of places in Georgia (U.S. state) (I–R)
- Newport, Illinois
- Fountain City, Indiana, originally named "Newport"
- Newport, Indiana
- Newport, Iowa; see Muscatine, Iowa micropolitan area#Unincorporated places
- Newport, Kentucky
- Newport, Maine, a New England town
  - Newport (CDP), Maine, the main village in the town
- Newport, Charles County, Maryland
- Newport, Michigan
- Newport, Minnesota
- Newport, Mississippi; see Mississippi Highway 3
- Newport, Missouri
- Newport, Nebraska
- Newport, New Hampshire, a New England town
  - Newport (CDP), New Hampshire, the main village in the town
- Newport, New Jersey (disambiguation)
- Newport, New York, a town
  - Newport (village), New York, within the town of Newport
- Newport, North Carolina
- Newport, Ohio (disambiguation)
- Newport, Oklahoma
- Newport, Oregon
- Newport, Pennsylvania
- Newport, Lawrence County, Pennsylvania; see List of places in Pennsylvania: N
- Newport Creek, a tributary of the Susquehanna River in Luzerne County, Pennsylvania
- Newport, Rhode Island
- Newport County, Rhode Island
- Newport, South Carolina
- Newport, Tennessee
- Newport, Texas
- Newport (town), Vermont
  - Newport (city), Vermont, within the town
- Newport, Virginia (disambiguation)
- Newport, Washington
- Newport, Bellevue, Washington
- Newport, West Virginia
- Newport, Wisconsin
- Newport Township (disambiguation)

=== Elsewhere ===
- Newport, Jamaica, the location of Bethabara Moravian Church
- Opua, New Zealand, originally named Newport
- Newport City, Metro Manila, Philippines, a district in Pasay
- Newport (Saigon), a US Army and Army of the Republic of Vietnam logistics base during the Vietnam War
- Newport (Martian crater)

== People ==
- Newport (surname)
- Newport, a slave and later freed servant to Ezra Stiles (1727–1795), American educator, academic, minister, theologian and author

== Buildings in the United States ==
- Newport Aquarium, Newport, Kentucky
- Newport Parish Church, former name of St. Luke's Church (Smithfield, Virginia), a historical church in Isle of Wight County, Virginia
- Newport Tower (Jersey City), the third tallest building in Jersey City, New Jersey
- Newport Tower (Rhode Island), a round stone tower in Newport, Rhode Island

== Educational institutions ==
- Christopher Newport University, a public university in Newport News, Virginia, US
- University of Wales, Newport
- Newport High School (disambiguation)

== Fictional places ==
- New Port City, fictional megacities where Ghost in the Shell and Dominion, two manga series by Masamune Shirow, are mostly set
- Newport, a fictional city on the west coast of North America in the videogames The Longest Journey and Dreamfall
- New Port, a fictional city where superheroes have been outlawed by its criminal ruler, Bomb Queen, in the Image Comics universe
- Newport, California, setting for the TV series The O.C.

== Music ==
- Newport Jazz Festival, in Newport, Rhode Island, also referred to sometimes as simply Newport, especially in the titles of some recordings of performers at the festival
- Newport Folk Festival, in Newport, Rhode Island, sometimes referred to as simply Newport
- "Newport (Ymerodraeth State of Mind)", a parody of the Jay-Z and Alicia Keys song "Empire State of Mind"
- Newport Music Hall, a music venue in Columbus, Ohio

== Naval vessels ==
- HMS Newport, various Royal Navy ships
- USS Newport (LST-1179), a US Navy tank landing ship in commission from 1969 to 1992

== Sport ==
- Newport City F.C.
- Newport County A.F.C.
- Newport Gwent Dragons, a former name of Dragons RFC, a Welsh rugby union team
- Newport HSOB RFC
- Newport (IOW) F.C.
- Newport Nocturne
- Newport (Salop) Rugby Union Football Club
- Newport Saracens RFC
- Newport RFC
- Newport Wasps

== Transport ==
=== Land ===
- Chrysler Newport, a vehicle manufactured from 1961 to 1981
- Newport Bus, bus services
- Newport station (disambiguation), railway and bus stations
- Newport (HBLR station), Jersey City, New Jersey, US
- Rock Island Swing Bridge, also known as the Newport Rail Bridge, an old swing bridge spanning the Mississippi River in Minnesota

=== Water ===
- Newport Ship, a 15th century sailing vessel
- Newport (steamboat), an American steamboat built in 1908
- Newport 20, an American sailboat design
- Newport 30, an American sailboat design
- Newport 31, an American sailboat design
- Newport 33, an American sailboat design

== Other uses ==
- Newport (cigarette), an American cigarette brand
- Newport Television, a media conglomerate
- Newport (Worship Team), a contemporary Christian and worship team from Orange County, California, US
- Newport Show, an agricultural show in Shropshire, England

== See also ==
- Newport Center (disambiguation)
- Newport East (disambiguation)
- Newport West (disambiguation)
- Newport Pagnell, Buckinghamshire
- Newport Rising, the last large-scale armed rebellion against authority in mainland Britain, in 1839
- Shrewsbury and Newport Canal, a former canal in Shropshire, England, awaiting restoration
- Nieuport, French airplane manufacturer
- Nieuwpoort (disambiguation)
- Nowy Port, a district of Gdańsk, Poland
