= Earl of Bradford =

Earldom in the Peerage of the United Kingdom

- Arms of Bridgeman, Earls of Bradford Blazon Arms: Sable, ten plates, four, three, two, and one, on a chief argent a lion passant ermines. Crest: A demi-lion rampant argent holding between the paws a wreath of laurel proper. Supporters: Two leopards, guardant gules pelletée.
- Creation date: 30 November 1815
- Creation: Second
- Created by: The Prince Regent (acting on behalf of his father, King George III)
- Peerage: United Kingdom
- First holder: Orlando Bridgeman, 2nd Baron Bradford
- Present holder: Richard Bridgeman, 7th Earl
- Heir apparent: Alexander Bridgeman, Viscount Newport
- Remainder to: the 1st Earl's heirs male of the body lawfully begotten.
- Subsidiary titles: Viscount Newport; Baron Bradford; Baronet Bridgeman of Great Lever
- Status: Extant
- Former seats: Weston Park; Castle Bromwich Hall
- Motto: NEC TEMERE NEC TIMIDE (Neither rashly nor timidly)

Earl of Bradford, of Bradford in the County of Salop, (Note: The title of the peerage refers to the ancient hundred of Bradford in Shropshire, and not, as might be assumed, to the city of Bradford, Yorkshire, or the town of Bradford-on-Avon in Wiltshire.) is a title that has been created twice, once in the Peerage of England and once in the Peerage of the United Kingdom. It was first created in 1694 for Francis Newport, 2nd Baron Newport. The earldom, along with the other Newport titles, became extinct on the death of the fourth Earl in 1762.

The earldom was revived in 1815 for Orlando Bridgeman, 2nd Baron Bradford. The Bridgeman family had previously succeeded to the Newport estates.

== History of the title ==
=== Newport creation ===
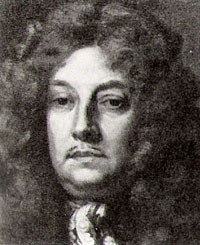
Francis Newport, 1st Earl of Bradford.

The Newports were an ancient Shropshire family. One member of the family, Richard Newport, represented Shropshire and Shrewsbury in Parliament and was a supporter of King Charles I during the Civil War. In 1642, he was raised to the Peerage of England as Baron Newport, of High Ercall in the County of Shropshire. His son, the second Baron, represented Shrewsbury in the Long Parliament and fought as a Royalist in the Civil War. After the Restoration, he served as Lord Lieutenant of Shropshire, as Comptroller of the Household and as Treasurer of the Household. In 1676, he was created Viscount Newport, of Bradford in the County of Shropshire, and on 11 May 1694, he was further honoured when he was made Earl of Bradford, in the County of Shropshire. Both titles were in the Peerage of England.

Lord Bradford was succeeded by his eldest son, the second Earl (and third Baron). He sat as a Whig Member of Parliament for Shropshire and served as Lord Lieutenant of Shropshire. In 1681, he married Mary Wilbraham, daughter of Sir Thomas Wilbraham, 3rd Baronet, and his wife Elizabeth (née Mytton). Through this marriage, Weston Park in Staffordshire came into the Newport family. Their eldest son, the third Earl, represented Bishop's Castle and Shropshire in the House of Commons and was also Lord Lieutenant of Staffordshire. He had no legitimate children, and on his death in 1734, the peerages passed to his younger brother, the fourth Earl. When he died in 1762, all Newport titles became extinct. The family estates, including Weston Park, were inherited by his nephew, Henry Bridgeman, the second (but oldest surviving) son of the 4th Baronet, and the future 5th Baronet, of Great Lever (see below). He was created Baron Bradford in 1794.

The Hon. Thomas Newport, younger son of the first Earl, was created Baron Torrington in 1716. He had no heirs, so the title became extinct with his death in 1719.

=== Bridgeman creation ===
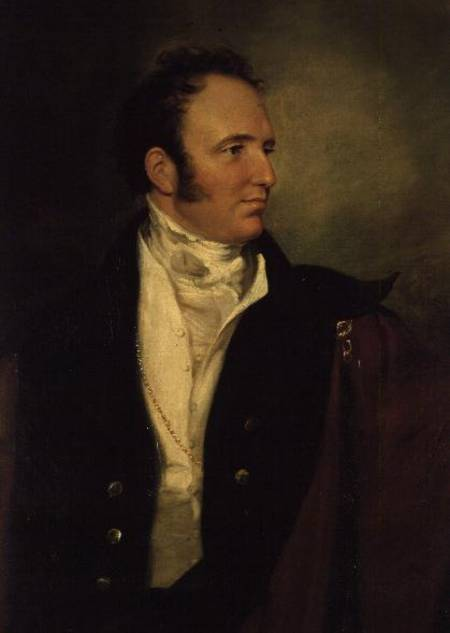
George Bridgeman, 2nd Earl of Bradford, by Sir George Hayter

The Bridgeman family originally stems from Devon. One member of the family, John Bridgeman, grandson of Edward Bridgeman, served as Bishop of Chester from 1619 to 1652. His son, Orlando Bridgeman, was a prominent lawyer and politician. In 1660, he was created a baronet, of Great Lever in the County of Lancaster, in the Baronetage of England. His great-grandson, the fourth Baronet, represented Shrewsbury in Parliament. In 1719, he married Lady Anne Newport, daughter of Richard Newport, 2nd Earl of Bradford, and sister of the 3rd and 4th Earls. Their son, the fifth Baronet, was a Member of Parliament for Ludlow and Wenlock for over forty years. In 1762, he succeeded through his mother to the Newport estates, including Weston Park, on the death of his maternal uncle, the fourth Earl of Bradford (see above). After Bridgeman's retirement from the House of Commons in 1794, the Bradford title held by his mother's family was revived when he was raised to the peerage as Baron Bradford, of Bradford in the County of Shropshire.

His son, the second Baron, represented Wigan in Parliament. In 1815, the earldom of Bradford was revived when he was created Viscount Newport, in the County of Shropshire, and Earl of Bradford, in the County of Shropshire. His grandson, the third Earl, was a Conservative politician and notably served as Lord Steward of the Household and as Master of the Horse. He was also Lord Lieutenant of Shropshire. His eldest son, the fourth Earl, represented North Shropshire in Parliament as a Conservative. He was succeeded by his eldest son, the fifth Earl. He was a Lieutenant-Colonel in the army and fought in the Boer War and in the First World War. He was also Private Secretary to both Prime Minister Lord Salisbury and to Prime Minister Arthur Balfour, and held office as a Government Whip in the House of Lords from 1919 to 1924. The present holder of the titles is his grandson, the seventh Earl, who succeeded in 1981.

Another member of the Bridgeman family was the Conservative politician William Bridgeman, 1st Viscount Bridgeman. He was the son of Reverend the Hon. John Robert Orlando Bridgeman, third son of the second Earl of Bradford.

== Family seats ==
The family seat is Weston Park in Staffordshire. They also held Castle Bromwich Hall, a manor in Warwickshire, along with the adjoining Castle Bromwich Hall Gardens. The Hall is now a hotel, and its gardens have been restored by a Trust and are open to the public.

Weston Park was held by the family until 1986. Gerald, the sixth Earl, who had succeeded to the title in 1957, died in 1981, leaving the family with large death duties. After five years of negotiations with the Treasury, Weston Park was donated to the nation via a foundation established in 1986.

Since then, a G8 Summit Retreat was held at Weston Park in 1998 with the heads of State or Government present including U.S. President Bill Clinton and Russian President Boris Yeltsin and, since 1999, the grounds of Weston Park have been used as one of the sites of the annual dual-site Virgin-sponsored V Festival. While the family of the 7th Earl of Bradford has no remaining claim to Weston Park, much of the artwork (including works by van Dyck and others) remains privately held.

== Earls of Bradford, first creation ==
Arms of Newport, Earls of Bradford: Argent, a chevron gules between three leopards' faces sable

=== Barons Newport (1642) ===
- Richard Newport, 1st Baron Newport (1587–1651)
- Francis Newport, 2nd Baron Newport (1620–1708) (created Viscount Newport in 1675)

=== Viscounts Newport (1675) ===
- Francis Newport, 1st Viscount Newport (1620–1708) (created Earl of Bradford in 1694)

=== Earls of Bradford (1694) ===
- Francis Newport, 1st Earl of Bradford (1620–1708)
- Richard Newport, 2nd Earl of Bradford (1644–1723)
- Henry Newport, 3rd Earl of Bradford (1684–1734)
- Thomas Newport, 4th Earl of Bradford (c. 1696 – 1762)

=== Title succession chart ===
Title succession chart

Title succession chart, Barons Newport, Viscounts Newport, and Earls of Bradford.

Baron Newport
Richard Newport; 1st Baron Newport; 1587–1651
Viscount Newport; Earl of Bradford
Francis Newport; 1st Earl of Bradford; 1620–1708	Hon. Andrew Newport; 1622–1699
Baron Torrington
Richard Newport; 2nd Earl of Bradford; 1644–1723	Thomas Newport; 1st Baron Torrington; 1654/1655 – 1719
Barony extinct
Henry Newport; 3rd Earl of Bradford; 1684–1734	Hon. Richard Newport; 1685–1716	Thomas Newport; 4th Earl of Bradford c. 1696 – 1762
Barony, viscountcy and earldom extinct

== Earls of Bradford, second creation ==
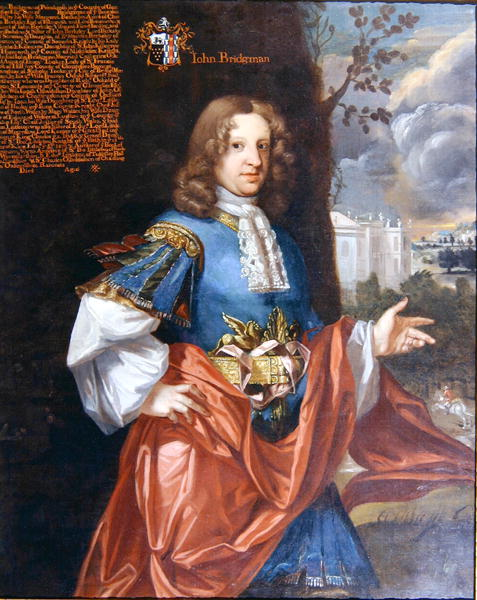
John Bridgeman, 2nd Baronet, by Johann Closterman

=== Bridgeman baronets, of Great Lever (1660) ===
- Sir Orlando Bridgeman, 1st Baronet (30 January 1606 – 25 June 1674), son of John Bridgeman, Bishop of Chester.
- Sir John Bridgeman, 2nd Baronet (16 August 1631 – 24 August 1710). Bridgeman was the son of the Lord Keeper of the Great Seal Sir Orlando Bridgeman, 1st Baronet, of Great Lever, and Judith Kynaston, and older brother of Sir Orlando Bridgeman, 1st Baronet, of Ridley, he was admitted to the Inner Temple in 1647 and called to the Bar in 1654, though given his father's expression of regret in his will that none of his sons followed him into the legal profession, one must infer that he never practiced. John succeeded to his father's baronetcy on 25 June 1674. He was married to Mary Cradock, daughter of George Cradock of Caverswall Castle. They had two children: Orlando Bridgeman, married Katherine Bridgeman, daughter of William Bridgeman; Sir John Bridgeman, 3rd Baronet. Bridgeman died, aged 79, in Castle Bromwich, Warwickshire, and was buried in Aston.

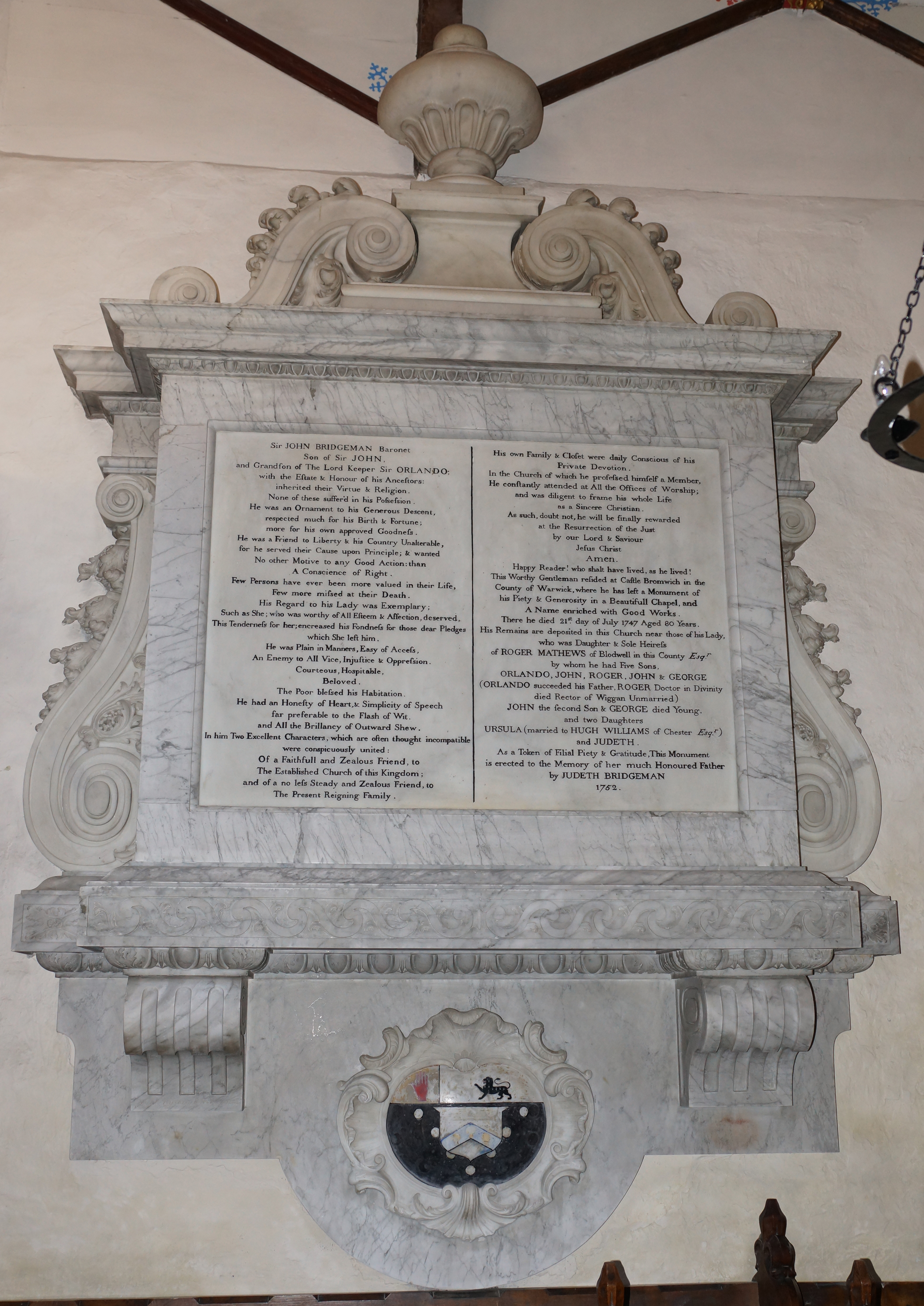
Funeral monument in St Michael the Archangel, Llanyblodwel, to John Bridgeman, 3rd Baronet, by John Michael Rysbrack

- Sir John Bridgeman, 3rd Baronet (9 August 1667 – 21 July 1747). Bridgeman was the second son of Sir John Bridgeman, 2nd Baronet, and Mary Cradock, and was educated at Oriel College, Oxford. In 1689, he was called to the Bar, Inner Temple. On 24 January 1710, Bridgeman succeeded in his father's baronetcy. He married Ursula Matthews, daughter of Roger Matthews, in 1694. They had two children: Sir Orlando Bridgeman, 4th Baronet; Ursula Bridgeman, married Hugh Williams. Bridgeman died, aged 79, and was buried in Llanyblodwel, Shropshire.
- Sir Orlando Bridgeman, 4th Baronet (2 July 1695 – 25 July 1764). Married Lady Anne Newport, third daughter of the 2nd Earl of Bradford (of the first creation, see above).
- Sir Henry Bridgeman, 5th Baronet (7 September 1725 – 5 June 1800) (created Baron Bradford in 1794).

=== Barons Bradford (1794) ===
- Henry Bridgeman, 1st Baron Bradford (1725–1800)
- Orlando Bridgeman, 2nd Baron Bradford (1762–1825) (created Viscount Newport and Earl of Bradford in 1815)

=== Earls of Bradford (1815) ===
Created by George III
#	Name	Life span	Spouse
1	Orlando Bridgeman	1762–1825	Hon. Lucy Elizabeth Byng
2	George Bridgeman	1789–1865	Georgina Elizabeth Moncreiffe
2	George Bridgeman	1789–1865	Helen, Lady Moncrieffe (née MacKay)
3	Orlando Bridgeman	1819–1898	Hon. Selina Weld-Forester
4	George Bridgeman	1845–1915	Lady Ida Frances Annabella Lumley
5	Orlando Bridgeman	1873–1957	Hon. Margaret Cecilia Bruce
6	Gerald Bridgeman	1911–1981	Mary Willoughby Montgomery
7	Richard Bridgeman	born 1947	Joanne Elizabeth Miller
7	Richard Bridgeman	born 1947	Dr. Penelope Anne Law

=== Title succession chart ===
Title succession chart

Title succession chart, Bridgeman baronets, Barons Bradford, and Earls of Bradford.

John Bridgeman; Bishop of Chester; 1577–1652
Bridgeman baronetcy of Great Lever
Sir Orlando Bridgeman; 1st Baronet; 1609–1674
Bridgeman baronetcy of Ridley
Sir John Bridgeman; 2nd Baronet; 1631–1710	Sir Orlando Bridgeman; 1st Baronet; 1649–1701
Sir John Bridgeman; 3rd Baronet; 1667–1747	Sir Orlando Bridgeman; 2nd Baronet; 1678–1746
Bridgeman baronetcy of Ridley extinct
Sir Orlando Bridgeman; 4th Baronet; 1695–1764	Lady Anne Newport (daughter of the 2nd Earl of Bradford of the first creation) died 1752	Francis Bridgeman (Note: Francis Bridgeman was the only son of the 2nd Baronet (of Ridley). Following his father's apparent drowning in 1738, Bridgeman was assumed to have inherited the baronetcy. Shortly thereafter though, his father, who had only feigned his death to avoid his creditors, was discovered in an inn and imprisoned. Thus, Bridgeman never actually succeeded to the title. He died, unmarried and childless, aged only 27, on board a ship in Sir Chaloner Ogle's fleet, en route to the West Indies. The baronetcy became extinct with the death of his father in 1746.); 1713–1740
Baron Bradford
Unknown son	Henry Bridgeman; 1st Baron Bradford; 5th Baronet; 1725–1800
Viscount Newport; Earl of Bradford
Orlando Bridgeman; 1st Earl of Bradford; 2nd Baron Bradford; 1762–1825
George Bridgeman; 2nd Earl of Bradford; 1789–1865
Orlando Bridgeman; 3rd Earl of Bradford; 1819–1898	Rev. Hon. John Bridgeman; 1831–1897
Viscount Bridgeman
George Bridgeman; 4th Earl of Bradford; 1845–1915	William Bridgeman; 1st Viscount Bridgeman; 1864–1935
Orlando Bridgeman; 5th Earl of Bradford; 1873–1957	Robert Bridgeman; 2nd Viscount Bridgeman; 1896–1982	Hon. Geoffrey Bridgeman; 1898–1974
Gerald Bridgeman; 6th Earl of Bradford; 1911–1981	Robin Bridgeman; 3rd Viscount Bridgeman; 1930–2026
Richard Bridgeman; 7th Earl of Bradford born 1947	Hon. William Bridgeman; 1968–2001	Luke Bridgeman; 4th Viscount Bridgeman born 1971
Alexander Bridgeman; Viscount Newport born 1980	Hon. Valentine Bridgeman born 1999

=== Line of succession ===
Line of succession
- Henry Bridgeman, 1st Baron Bradford (1725–1800)
  - Orlando Bridgeman, 1st Earl of Bradford (1762–1825)
    - George Augustus Frederick Henry Bridgeman, 2nd Earl of Bradford (1789–1865)
      - Orlando George Charles Bridgeman, 3rd Earl of Bradford (1819–1898)
        - George Cecil Orlando Bridgeman, 4th Earl of Bradford (1845–1915)
          - Orlando Bridgeman, 5th Earl of Bradford (1873–1957)
            - Gerald Michael Orlando Bridgeman, 6th Earl of Bradford (1911–1981)
              - Richard Thomas Orlando Bridgeman, 7th Earl of Bradford (born 1947)
                - (1) Alexander Michael Orlando Bridgeman, Viscount Newport (born 1980)
                  - (2) Hon. Archibald Henry Orlando Bridgeman (born 2024)
                  - (3) Hon. Orlando George Alexander Bridgeman (born 2026)
                - (4) Hon. Henry Gerald Orlando Bridgeman (born 1982)
                - (5) Hon. Benjamin Thomas Orlando Bridgeman (born 1987)
              - (6) Hon. Charles Gerald Orlando Bridgeman (born 1954)
                - (7) James Edward Charles Bridgeman (born 1978)
                - (8) Robert Gerald Orlando Bridgeman (born 1983)
                - (9) Nicholas Francis Orlando Bridgeman (born 1991)
          - Lt.Col. Hon. Henry George Orlando Bridgeman (1882–1972)
            - Lt.Col. Peter Orlando Ronald Bridgeman (1933–2013)
              - (10) Mark George Orlando Bridgeman (born 1968)
                - (11) Ned Aidan Orlando Bridgeman (born c. 2000)
                - (12) Benedict Bridgeman (born 2005)
            - (13) John Henry Orlando Bridgeman (born 1938)
        - Brig.Gen. Hon. Francis Charles Bridgeman (1846–1917)
          - Reginald Francis Orlando Bridgeman (1884–1968)
            - (14) Henry Clive Orlando Bridgeman (born 1946)
      - Rev. Hon. George Thomas Orlando Bridgeman (1823–1895)
        - Charles George Orlando Bridgeman (1852–1933)
          - Roger Orlando Bridgeman (1889–1975)
            - Richard Lynedoch Orlando Bridgeman (1931–1982)
              - (15) Leopold Orlando Bridgeman (born 1968)
              - (16) Constantine Orlando Bridgeman (born 1970)
                - (17) Hector Richard Orlando Bridgeman (born 2006)
                - (18) Orland Bridgeman (born 2008)
      - Rev. Hon. John Robert Orlando Bridgeman (1831–1897)
        - William Clive Bridgeman, 1st Viscount Bridgeman (1864–1935)
          - Brig. Geoffrey John Orlando Bridgeman (1898–1974)
            - Robin John Bridgeman, 3rd Viscount Bridgeman (1930–2026)
              - (19) Luke Robinson Orlando Bridgeman, 4th Viscount Bridgeman (born 1971)
                - (20) Valentine Henry Ralph Orlando Bridgeman (born 1999)
                - (21) Felix Bridgeman (born 2002)
              - (22) Hon. Esmond Francis Ralph Bridgeman (born 1974)
              - (23) Hon. Orlando Henry Geoffrey Bridgeman (born 1983)

== See also ==
- Baron Torrington
- Viscount Bridgeman
- Bridgeman baronets
