= Newport (surname) =

Newport is a surname. Notable people with the surname include:

- Andrew Newport (MP, died 1611) (1563–1611), English politician
- Andrew Newport (MP, died 1699) (1622–1699), English politician, courtier and royalist
- Andrew Newport (Warden of the Mint) (died before 1408)
- Bronwyn Newport (born 1985), American television personality and fashion blogger
- Cal Newport (born 1982) American non-fiction author and associate professor of computer science
- Christopher Newport (1561–1617), English seaman and privateer
- Elissa L. Newport (born c. 1947), American professor of neurology
- Esther Newport (1901–1986), American painter, sculptor and art educator who founded the Catholic Art Association
- Francis Newport (fl. 1559), English Member of Parliament (MP)
- Francis Newport (died 1623) (c. 1555–1623), English MP
- Francis Newport, 1st Earl of Bradford (1620–1708), English soldier, courtier and politician
- George Newport (1803–1854), English entomologist
- George Newport (cricketer) (1876–1953), English first-class cricketer
- Henry Newport, 3rd Earl of Bradford (1683–1734), English politician
- Sir John Newport, 1st Baronet (1756–1843), Anglo-Irish politician
- Matilda Newport (c. 1795–1837), American-born Liberian colonist and folk hero
- Phil Newport (born 1962), English former cricketer
- Richard Newport (disambiguation)
- Stephen Newport (born 1965), Australian rules footballer
- Thomas Newport, 1st Baron Torrington (c. 1655–1719), English MP
- Thomas Newport, 4th Earl of Bradford (c. 1696–1762), English peer
