= Robert Lloyd (died 1734) =

English politician (died 1734)

Robert Lloyd (c. 1688 – 6 June 1734) was an English politician. He sat as MP for Shropshire from 1710 till 1713 and 1722 till 1727, and Mayor of Oswestry in 1717.

== Family and education ==
Robert Lloyd was the first surviving son of Robert Lloyd and Mary, the daughter of Sir John Bridgeman. He was educated at Rugby School in 1698. On 5 April 1707, he was matriculated at Magdalen College, Oxford at the age of 18. He entered the Inner Temple in 1708. He died unmarried.

== Political career ==
In July 1710, Robert Lloyd initially decided to withdraw as a candidate for Shropshire because of financial concerns and pressure from his Whig uncle, John Bridgeman. But he later reversed his decision and stood alongside John Kynaston. In December 1712, he initially agreed to stand in the next election with Sir John Astley, 2nd Baronet but he later announced he would not seek re-election.

After the death of Queen Anne, he was encouraged to stand jointly with Henry Newport, 3rd Earl of Bradford for Shropshire. Instead, he attempted to stand independently but withdrew before the election.

In 1722, he returned to politics as the election partner of John Kynaston despite earlier political disagreements.

== Death ==
Robert Lloyd died at Bristol on 6 June 1734. He was buried in the Lloyd family chapel at Aston. His estates, burdened by approximately £10,000 of debt passed to his cousin, John Lloyd.
