= Thomas Newport =

Thomas Newport may refer to:

- Thomas Newport, 1st Baron Torrington (c. 1655–1719), English MP for Ludlow, Winchelse, (Much) Wenlock and Teller of the Exchequer
- Thomas Newport, 4th Earl of Bradford (c. 1696–1762), English peer
