= Sir Edward Leighton, 1st Baronet =

English politician

Sir Edward Leighton, 1st Baronet (c.1650–1711), of Wattlesborough Castle, Shropshire, was a Whig politician who sat in the English and British House of Commons between 1698 and 1710.

== Early life ==
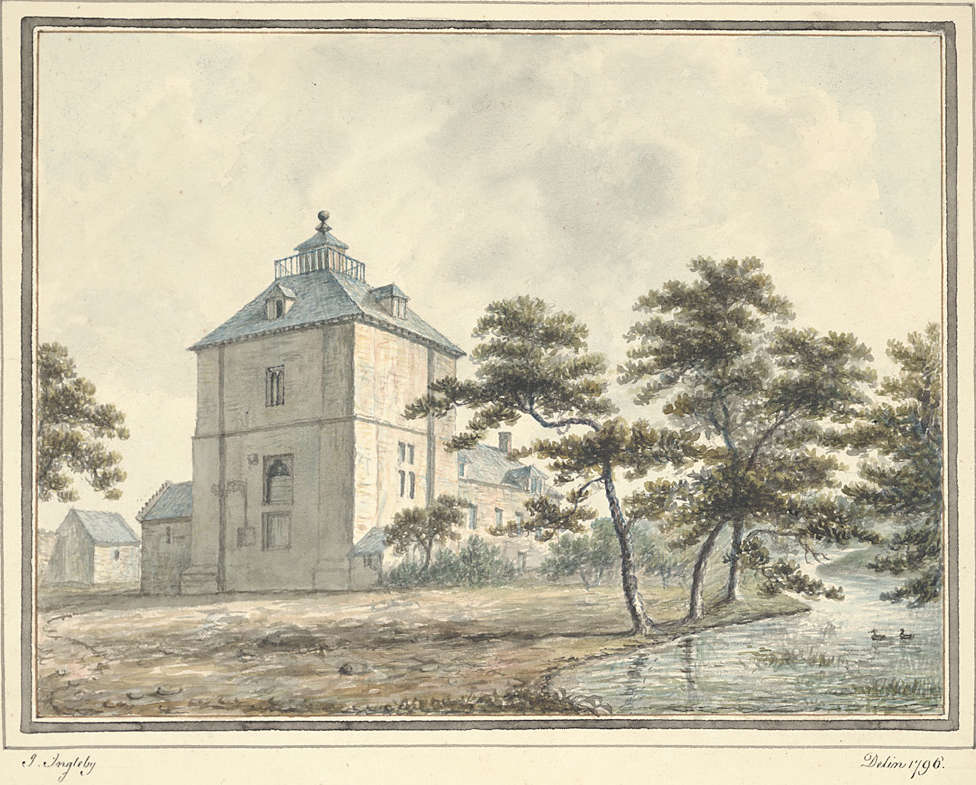
Wattlesborough Tower

Leighton was the eldest surviving son of Robert Leighton (MP), of Wattlesborough Castle, and his wife, Gertrude Baldwin, daughter of Edward Baldwin of Diddlebury, Shropshire. He was educated at Shrewsbury School in 1661, and matriculated at Christ Church, Oxford on 5 August 1668, aged 18, and was admitted at Inner Temple in 1669.

He married Dorothy Charlton, daughter of Sir Job Charlton, 1st Baronet of Ludford, Herefordshire on 24 May 1677. She died in 1688, and in 1689 he succeeded his father to Wattlesborough. For the year 1692 to 1693, he was High Sheriff of Shropshire. He was created a baronet on 2 March 1693. On 29 July 1693, he married as his second wife, Jane Nicholls, daughter of Daniel Nicholls, merchant, of London.

== Career ==
Leighton stood as a Whig for both Shrewsbury and Shropshire at the 1695 English general election but was defeated at both constituencies. At the 1698 English general election he was returned unopposed as Member of Parliament for Shropshire. He was relatively inactive in Parliament and voted against a bill to disband the army on 18 January 1699. He did not stand again in the next four general elections.

Leighton stood as a Whig at the 1708 British general election for Shrewsbury and was defeated in the poll. However, he petitioned and was seated as MP on 20 December 1709. He voted for the impeachment of Dr Sacheverell, in 1710 and in April 1710 was probably the Leighton who signed a letter to the lord lieutenant, objecting to the manner by which the Shrewsbury Tories wrote an address to the Queen in favour of Sacheverell. He lost his seat at the 1710 British general election.

== Death and legacy ==
Leighton died in April 1711 and was buried at Alberbury, Shropshire, on 6 April. He had three sons and four daughters by each of his wives. He left Wattlesborough Castle to his widow for her lifetime. He was succeeded in the baronetcy by his son Edward, who changed the family residence to Loton Park.

Parliament of England
Preceded by Edward Kynaston; Hon. Richard Newport	Member of Parliament for Shropshire; 1698–1701; With: Edward Kynaston 1698–1699; Robert Lloyd 1699–1701	Succeeded by Robert Lloyd; Sir Humphrey Briggs
Parliament of Great Britain
Preceded by Richard Mytton; John Kynaston	Member of Parliament for Shrewsbury; 1709–1710; With: Thomas Jones 1710	Succeeded by Edward Cressett; Richard Mytton
Baronetage of England
New creation	Baronet (of Wattlesborough); 1693–1711	Succeeded by Edward Leighton
