= Sir Robert Corbet, 4th Baronet =

English Whig politician

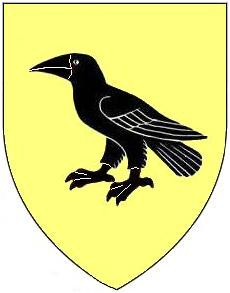
Corbet Coat of Arms

Sir Robert Corbet, 4th Baronet (c. 1670 – 3 October 1740), of Stoke, Shropshire, was an English Whig politician who sat in the English and British House of Commons between 1705 and 1722, and was an official in the Royal Household.

Corbet was the only surviving son of Sir John Corbet, 3rd Baronet of Stoke upon Tern, Shropshire. He matriculated at Christ Church, Oxford on 6 July 1687, aged 17 and was admitted to the Inner Temple in 1688. He succeeded to the baronetcy in 1695.

Corbet was appointed High Sheriff of Shropshire for 1700–01 and was then elected to Parliament at the 1705 English general election to represent the county of Shropshire until 1710. He was reelected for Shropshire again in 1715, sitting until 1722. He was a loyal Whig and was rewarded for his party loyalty with the position of Clerk of the Green Cloth in the Royal household, a position he held, progressing from Third Clerk to First Clerk, until 1735.

In that year he gave up the position in the Royal household to make way for a current Member of Parliament and was made instead a Commissioner of Customs until his death.

Corbet died in 1740. He had married Jane, the daughter of William Hooker, with whom he had 3 sons and 3 daughters. The baronetcy passed to his eldest son Sir William Corbet, 5th Baronet.

Parliament of Great Britain
Preceded by John Kynaston; Lord Newport	Member of Parliament for Shropshire; 1715–1722; With: Lord Newport	Succeeded by John Kynaston; Robert Lloyd
Preceded by Parliament of England	Member of Parliament for Shropshire; 1707–1710; With: Robert Lloyd 1707; Lord Newport 1708–1710	Succeeded by John Kynaston; Robert Lloyd
Parliament of England
Preceded by Roger Owen; Richard Corbet	Member of Parliament for Shropshire; 1705–1707; With: Robert Lloyd	Succeeded by Parliament of Great Britain
Baronetage of England
Preceded by John Corbet	Baronet (of Stoke upon Tern); 1695-1740	Succeeded by William Corbet
