= Newport micropolitan area =

The Newport micropolitan area may refer to:

- The Newport, Oregon micropolitan area, United States
- The Newport, Tennessee micropolitan area, United States

== See also ==
- Newport (disambiguation)
