= Aubrey Strosnider =

American football player (1904–1970)

Profile
- Position: Tackle

Personal information
- Born: May 9, 1904; Newport, Ohio, (Note: There are several places known as Newport, Ohio, and the available sources do not specify which Newport is meant.) U.S.
- Died: October 27, 1964 (age 60)
- Listed height: 6 ft 1 in (1.85 m)
- Listed weight: 205 lb (93 kg)

Career information
- College: Dayton

Career history
- Dayton Triangles (1928)
- Stats at Pro Football Reference

Aubrey Joseph "Ab" Strosnider (May 9, 1904 – October 27, 1964) was an American football player and coach.

He was born in Newport, Ohio, in 1904. He attended University of Dayton Prep School, then enrolled at the University of Dayton, where he played football from 1923 to 1927. He also played one game in the National Football League (NFL) for the Dayton Triangles in 1928. He later became a football coach at Catholic High School in Dayton, and later still an assistant coach for the University of Dayton.

Strosnider died in 1964 in Cleveland. He was posthumously inducted into the University of Dayton Hall of Fame in 1982.
