= Richard Newport =

Richard Newport may refer to:

- Richard Newport (died 1570), MP for Shropshire
- Richard Newport, 1st Baron Newport (1587–1651), English peer, MP for Shropshire in 1614, 1624–1629 and for Shrewsbury
- Richard Newport, 2nd Earl of Bradford (1644–1723), English peer and MP for Shropshire 1670–1685 and 1689–1698
- Richard Newport (MP) (1685–1716), English MP for (Much) Wenlock and son of the 2nd Earl of Bradford
- Richard Newport (bishop) (died 1318), English bishop of London
- Richard Spicer alias Newport (died c. 1435), MP for Portsmouth, 1402
