= Andrew Newport (MP, died 1699) =

The Honourable Andrew Newport JP

Esquire of the Body
- In office 1660–1667

Comptroller of the Great Wardrobe
- In office 1667–1681

Commissioner of Customs
- In office 1681–1685

Member of the English Parliament for Montgomeryshire
- In office 1661–1679
- Preceded by: Edward Vaughan
- Succeeded by: Hon. Price Devereux

Member of Parliament for Preston
- In office 1685–1689
- Preceded by: Sir Thomas Chicheley
- Succeeded by: James Stanley

Member of Parliament for Shrewsbury
- In office 1685–1689
- Preceded by: Thomas Harris
- Succeeded by: Robert Wright

Personal details
- Born: Andrew Newport; 30 November 1622
- Died: 11 September 1699 (aged 76)
- Party: Tory

Andrew Newport JP (baptised 30 November 1622 – 11 September 1699), styled The Honourable from 1642, was an English Tory politician, courtier and royalist.

== Background ==
He was the second son of Richard Newport, 1st Baron Newport, and his wife Rachel, daughter of Sir John Leveson, and baptised at High Ercall, Shropshire. His older brother was Francis Newport, 1st Earl of Bradford. He was educated at a school in Wroxeter, and Christ Church, Oxford. Like his father and brother, Newport was an active supporter of King Charles II of England during the English Civil War. After the Penruddock uprising in 1655 and the failed pro-Royalist military activities of Sir George Booth, 2nd Baronet, in 1659, he was arrested each time and imprisoned. Following the English Restoration, he was nominated for a proposed Order of the Royal Oak and an estate worth £800 a year was settled on him, with his principal lands being at Deythur, near Llandrinio, Montgomeryshire.

== Career ==
In 1660, following the English Restoration, Newport was called to the court as Esquire of the Body. From 1667 to 1681 he served as comptroller of the Great Wardrobe and was subsequently nominated a Commissioner of Customs in 1681, an office he held until 1685. Newport entered the English House of Commons in a by-election in 1661, sitting for Montgomeryshire until 1679. He was returned for Preston from 1685 until 1689 and then for Shrewsbury until 1698. Militarily, Newport held commission as Captain of a company of foot on the Portsmouth garrison from 1662 to 1673. Newport was a Custos Rotulorum of Montgomeryshire between January and December 1679. He was again appointed in 1685, until 1687 and exercised this post a third time from 1691 until his death eight years later. Newport represented the county also as Justice of the Peace and was Commissioner for Assessment of Salop and Montgomeryshire several times. Newport was one of a number of men unsuccessfully implicated by Jacobite conspirator Sir John Fenwick when prosecuted in 1695 prior to the latter's eventual execution in 1697, the allegation being that while Newport was absent from London he allowed his home in Berkeley Street to be used for meetings by two Jacobite noblemen.

== Death ==
Newport died unmarried and childless, at Eyton-on-Severn, Shropshire, the home of his nephew, Lord Newport, in 1699 aged 76, and was buried in the chancel at nearby Wroxeter church. He left his estates and a £40,000 fortune to his younger nephew Thomas Newport.

== Literary reference ==
Andrew Newport has been speculatively identified with the Andrew Newport who nominally wrote Memoirs of a Cavalier (published 1720), a supposedly factual but possibly fictional account of experiences in the Thirty Years' War and Royalist campaigns in England by a Shropshire-born soldier. It was published by Daniel Defoe, strongly suspected to be the real author, over 20 years after the death of this Andrew Newport, who was only ten years old in the year the account begins (1632). Although of age (twenty in 1642) to have served in the English Civil War, there is doubt in absence of record that Newport did and he appears in no list of royalists fined by parliament for delinquency, unlike his father and elder brother.

Parliament of England
Preceded by Edward Vaughan	Member of Parliament for Montgomeryshire; 1661–1679	Succeeded by Edward Vaughan
Preceded by Sir Thomas Chicheley; Edward Fleetwood	Member of Parliament for Preston; 1685–1689; With: Edward Fleetwood	Succeeded by James Stanley; Thomas Patten
Preceded by Edward Kynaston; Sir Francis Edwardes, 2nd Bt	Member of Parliament for Shrewsbury; 1689–1698; With: Sir Francis Edwardes, 2nd Bt 1689–1690; Richard Mytton 1690–1694; John Kynaston 1694–1698	Succeeded by Richard Mytton; John Kynaston
Honorary titles
Preceded by The 3rd Lord Herbert of Chirbury	Custos Rotulorum of Montgomeryshire; January–December 1679	Succeeded by The 4th Lord Herbert of Chirbury
Preceded by The 4th Lord Herbert of Chirbury	Custos Rotulorum of Montgomeryshire; 1685–1687	Succeeded by The Marquess of Powis
Preceded by The 4th Lord Herbert of Chirbury	Custos Rotulorum of Montgomeryshire; 1691–1699	Succeeded by The Earl of Macclesfield
