= Richard Bridgeman, 7th Earl of Bradford =

British peer (born 1947)

The Right Honourable The Earl of Bradford
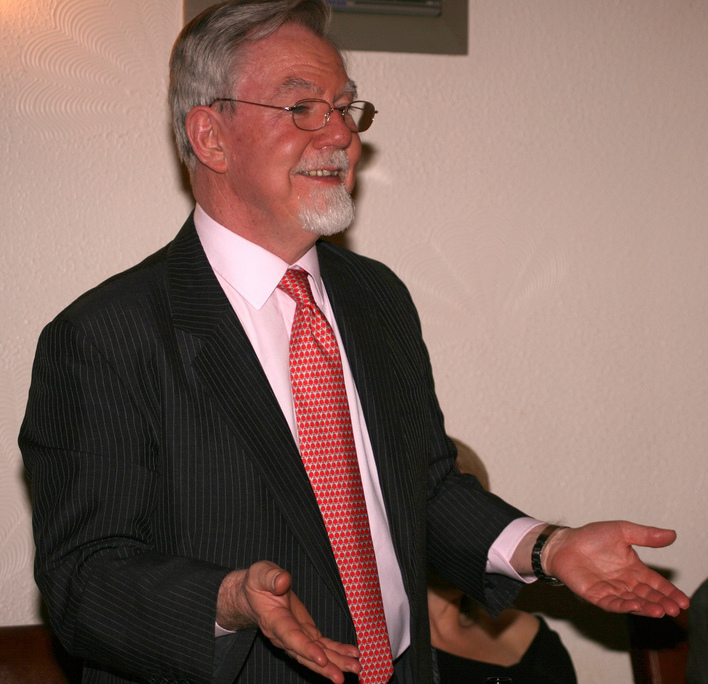

Member of the House of Lords
- Lord Temporal
- In office 31 August 1981 – 11 November 1999 as a hereditary peer
- Preceded by: The 6th Earl of Bradford
- Succeeded by: Seat abolished (Note: Pursuant to the House of Lords Act 1999.)

Personal details
- Born: Richard Thomas Orlando Bridgeman; 3 October 1947 (age 78)
- Spouses: Joanne Miller (m. 1979; div. 2006) Dr Penelope Law (m. 2008; div. 2021)
- Children: Alexander Bridgeman, Viscount Newport; Hon. Henry Bridgeman; Hon. Benjamin Bridgeman; Lady Alicia Bridgeman
- Parent(s): Gerald Bridgeman, 6th Earl of Bradford; Mary Willoughby Montgomery
- Other titles: 8th Baron Bradford; 12th Baronet (of Great Lever)

Richard Thomas Orlando Bridgeman, 7th Earl of Bradford (born 3 October 1947), styled Viscount Newport from 1957 to 1981, is a British peer, politician and businessman.

== Background and education ==
Bradford is the son of Gerald Bridgeman, 6th Earl of Bradford, and Mary Willoughby Montgomery. He was educated at St Ronan's School in Hawkhurst, Kent; Harrow School, just outside London; and Trinity College, Cambridge, where he graduated with a Bachelor of Arts in 1969 and a Master of Arts in 1973. He succeeded to his father's title in 1981.

== Career ==
In 1979, Bradford opened Porters English Restaurant in Covent Garden, London. He later opened the Covent Garden Grill next door. In January 2015, the restaurants closed as the landlord would not extend the lease and Bradford moved his business to Hertfordshire, where he opened Porters Restaurant in Berkhamsted. The restaurant closed on 30 September 2018.

From 1986 to 1999, he was the chairman of Weston Park Enterprises. Because the 6th Earl left the family with large death duties, Bradford gifted his home Weston Park and 1,000 acres to the nation in 1986, with the support of the National Heritage Memorial Fund, to the Weston Park Foundation.

Bradford stood for the UK Independence Party (UKIP) at the 2001 general election in the constituency of Stafford. He received 2,315 votes (5.2%), losing to David Kidney, but achieving the fourth-best result for UKIP. He stood for UKIP again at the 2004 European Parliament election for West Midlands in 2004, coming eighth; seven candidates were elected. In May 2012, he stood unsuccessfully for UKIP in a by-election in the Hyde Park ward of Westminster City Council, with the support of the celebrity nightclub-owner Peter Stringfellow.

Lord Bradford is an active campaigner against the sale of false titles of nobility. Bradford has alleged that he has been subjected to an online smear campaign in retaliation for his campaign, with unfavourable reviews being posted on TripAdvisor and the appearance of fraudulent review websites.

== Family ==
On 15 September 1979, he married Joanne Elizabeth Miller, elder daughter of Benjamin Miller, a Mayfair bookmaker. They divorced in 2006. They have four children:

- Alexander Michael Orlando Bridgeman, Viscount Newport (born 6 September 1980), current steward of the Bradford Estates, who married Eliza Liepina on 18 May 2022;
- Hon. Henry Gerald Orlando Bridgeman (born 18 April 1982), who married Lucinda Bodie on 27 May 2014;
- Hon. Benjamin Thomas Orlando Bridgeman (born 7 February 1987); and
- Lady Alicia Rose Bridgeman, who married Philip Warrilow-Wilson in September 2018.

On 30 August 2008, he married Dr Penelope Ann Law, a consultant obstetrician and author of the book Expecting a Baby? (One Born Every Minute).

== Works ==
- My Private Parts and The Stuffed Parrot (1984)
- The Eccentric Cookbook (1985)
- Stately Secrets (1994)
- Porters English Cookery Bible – Ancient and Modern, with Carol Wilson (2004)
- Porters Seasonal Celebrations Cookbook, with Carol Wilson (2007)

== Arms ==
Coat of arms of Richard Bridgeman, 7th Earl of Bradford
Coronet That of an earl. Crest A demi-lion rampant argent holding between the paws a wreath of laurel proper. Escutcheon Sable, ten plates, four, three, two, and one, on a chief argent a lion passant ermines. Supporters Two leopards, guardant gules pelletée. Motto Nec temere, nec I timide (Neither rashley nor timidly).

== Notes ==
Peerage of the United Kingdom
Preceded by Gerald Bridgeman	Earl of Bradford; 2nd creation 1981–present Member of the House of Lords (1981–1999)	Incumbent; Heir apparent: Alexander Bridgeman, Viscount Newport
Peerage of Great Britain
Preceded by Gerald Bridgeman	Baron Bradford; 1981–present	Incumbent; Heir apparent: Alexander Bridgeman, Viscount Newport
Baronetage of England
Preceded by Gerald Bridgeman	Baronet of Great Lever; 1981–present	Incumbent; Heir apparent: Alexander Bridgeman, Viscount Newport
