= Gerald Bridgeman, 6th Earl of Bradford =

British peer and soldier (1911–1981)

The Right Honourable The Earl of Bradford TD DL JP

Member of the House of Lords
- Lord Temporal
- In office 21 March 1957 – 30 August 1981
- Preceded by: The 5th Earl of Bradford
- Succeeded by: The 7th Earl of Bradford

Personal details
- Born: 29 September 1911 Belgravia, London
- Died: 30 August 1981 (aged 69)
- Spouse: Mary Willoughby Montgomery
- Children: Richard Thomas Orlando Bridgeman; Serena Mary Bridgeman; Caroline Louise Bridgeman; Charles Gerald Orlando Bridgeman
- Parent(s): Orlando Bridgeman, 5th Earl of Bradford; Hon. Margaret Cecilia Bruce
- Other titles: 7th Baron Bradford; 11th Baronet (of Great Lever)

Gerald Michael Orlando Bridgeman, 6th Earl of Bradford (29 September 1911 – 30 August 1981), styled Viscount Newport between 1915 and 1957, was a British peer, soldier, and arboriculturist.

== Early life and education ==
Bradford was born at 83 Eaton Square, Belgravia, London, the only son of Orlando Bridgeman, Viscount Newport, and his wife Margaret, Viscountess Newport (née Bruce), eldest daughter of Henry Bruce, 2nd Baron Aberdare. He was christened a month later at Holy Trinity Sloane Street. His godparents were Margaret Hamilton-Russell, Viscountess Boyne; his aunt Eva Primrose, Countess of Rosebery (then Hon. Mrs. Algernon Strutt), Aldred Lumley, 10th Earl of Scarbrough; and his uncle Lt. Hon. Richard Orlando Beaconsfield Bridgeman. Beginning in 1915, he was styled Viscount Newport when his father succeeded as 5th Earl of Bradford.

Bridgeman was educated at Harrow School and went then to Trinity College, Cambridge, where he graduated with a Bachelor of Arts in 1932. In 1961, he received a Master of Arts from Trinity College.

== Career ==
Bridgeman was commissioned in 1938 in the Shropshire Yeomanry, Royal Armoured Corps, part of the Territorial Army, and fought in the regiment as part of the Royal Artillery in Italy in the Second World War. He was mentioned in despatches and was decorated with the Territorial Decoration. On his retirement in 1962, he was granted the rank of a captain.

Elected in 1955, Bridgeman was president of the Country Landowners' Association for two years.

In 1957, he succeeded his father as Earl of Bradford.

In 1975, he received the Bledisloe Gold Medal for Landowners by the Royal Agricultural Society of England.

Bridgeman was justice of the peace for Shropshire from 1949 and became deputy lieutenant of that county two years later. He was appointed Crown Estate Commissioner in 1956, a post he held until 1968. In 1970, he was appointed vice lord-lieutenant.

He owned land in Castle Bromwich, Warwickshire.

== Marriage and issue ==
On 31 October 1946, he married Mary Willoughby Montgomery, elder daughter of Lieutenant-Colonel Thomas Hassard Montgomery and Hester Frances Dames-Longworth. They had four children:

- Richard Thomas Orlando Bridgeman, 7th Earl of Bradford (b. 3 October 1947)
- Lady Serena Mary Bridgeman (1 July 1949 – 16 January 2001) married Richard Andrew (died 2000) on 27 April 1978 and divorced in 1989. Committed suicide by taking paracetamol.
- Lady Caroline Louise Bridgeman (born 18 April 1952), married Brian Garnell on 5 October 1974.
- Hon. Charles Gerald Orlando Bridgeman (born 25 June 1954), married Nicola Sales on 17 January 1982.

Bridgeman died in 1981 and was succeeded in his titles by his older son Richard.

== Arms ==
Coat of arms of Gerald Bridgeman, 6th Earl of Bradford
Coronet That of an earl. Crest A demi-lion rampant argent holding between the paws a wreath of laurel proper. Escutcheon Sable, ten plates, four, three, two, and one, on a chief argent a lion passant ermines. Supporters Two leopards, guardant gules pelletée. Motto Nec temere, nec I timide (Neither rashley nor timidly).

Peerage of the United Kingdom
Preceded by Orlando Bridgeman	Earl of Bradford; 2nd creation 1957–1981; Member of the House of Lords (1957–1981)	Succeeded by Richard Bridgeman
Peerage of Great Britain
Preceded by Orlando Bridgeman	Baron Bradford; 1957–1981	Succeeded by Richard Bridgeman
Baronetage of England
Preceded by Orlando Bridgeman	Baronet of Great Lever; 1957–1981	Succeeded by Richard Bridgeman
