= Heber-Percy =

Heber-Percy is a surname. Notable people with the surname include:

- Sir Algernon Heber-Percy (born 1944), British landowner, farmer, and public official
- Robert Heber-Percy (1911–1987), English eccentric, "the Mad Boy"
