= Francis Bridgeman =

Francis Bridgeman may refer to:

- Francis Bridgeman (married 1673), son of Sir Orlando Bridgeman, 1st Baronet, of Great Lever
- Sir Francis Bridgeman, 3rd Baronet (1713–1740), British baronet
- Francis Bridgeman (British Army officer) (1846–1917), British Army brigadier-general and MP for Bolton
- Francis Bridgeman (Royal Navy officer) (1848–1929), British First Sea Lord

== See also ==
- Bridgeman (surname)
