= Sir Orlando Bridgeman, 2nd Baronet =

British landowner and politician (1678–1746)

Sir Orlando Bridgeman, 2nd Baronet (27 April 1678 – 5 December 1746) was a British landowner and Whig politician who sat in the House of Commons between 1707 and 1738. He faked his own death in 1738 and spent the rest of his life in prison.

== Early life ==
Bridgeman was the eldest son of Sir Orlando Bridgeman, 1st Baronet and his wife Mary Cave, daughter of Sir Thomas Cave, 1st Baronet. He was educated at Rugby School in Warwickshire and matriculated at Trinity College, Oxford on 10 November 1694, aged 15. He succeeded his father to the baronetcy on the latter's death in 1701 He inherited the family estate at Bowood Park, Wiltshire, where a lease from the crown was renewed in 1702. On 15 April 1702, he married Susanna Dashwood, daughter of Sir Francis Dashwood, 1st Baronet, a wealthy City merchant. It was a financially advantageous match as Bridgeman acquired Wanstead, one of Dashwood's manors in Essex, as part of the marriage settlement. He used Wanstead as his main country residence for a while, but later sold it.

== Career ==
Bridgeman's father had a high reputation at Coventry At the 1705 English general election Bridgeman stood as a Whig for Coventry where there was a significant family electoral interest. He was defeated, but he and his partner petitioned and as a result, the election was declared void on 7 February 1707. After a second contest on 25 February 1707, he was returned as a Member of Parliament for Coventry. He was re-elected MP for Coventry at the 1708 British general election and saw off a petition by his opponents accusing him of bribery. He voted for the naturalization of the Palatines and for the impeachment of Dr Sacheverell. At the 1710, he was defeated at Coventry as a result of the Tory resurgence in the city.

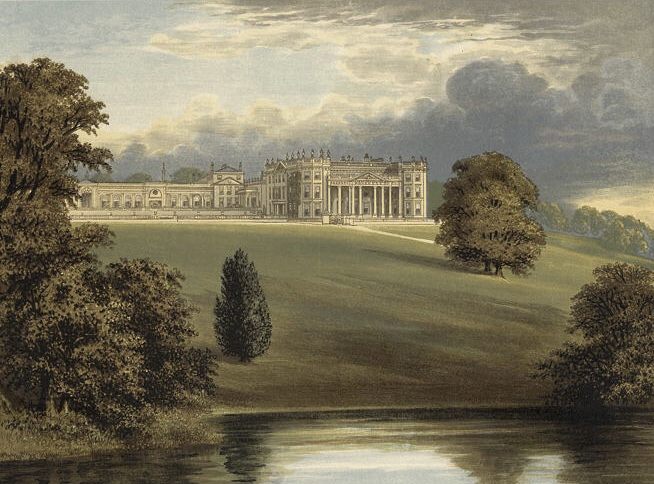
Bowood House, 1880

After five years out of Parliament, Bridgeman was returned as MP for Calne at the 1715 British general election. In 1716, he was appointed Auditor General to George, Prince of Wales. He voted for the septennial bill, but in 1717 went into opposition with the Prince of Wales and voted against the Government on 4 June 1717 on Lord Cadogan and on the Peerage Bill. He lost his seat at the 1722 British general election but was returned as MP for Lostwithiel at a by-election on 25 February 1724. When the Prince of Wales succeeded to the throne in 1727, Bridgeman was appointed to the Board of Trade as a Lord of Trade, an office he held until 1738. At the 1727 British general election, he was returned unopposed at Calne and also at Blechingley and chose to sit chose to sit at Bletchingley. He changed seats again at the 1734 British general election when was returned as MP for Dunwich. On 10 March 1735 he seconded a petition from the Georgia Society for a grant-in-aid to the colony. He had started to build a new house at Bowood but he got deeply into debt and the Chancery Courts started with proceedings against him in 1737. In 1737, he was nominated as Governor of Barbados, a lucrative post, but with a high mortality rate.

== Disappearance ==
Bridgeman disappeared before sailing to Barbados. He left farewell letters to his family and to the king and left his clothes by the side of the Thames. On 10 June 1738, a body was found drowned in the Thames near Limehouse and because it had been disfigured by the water, the body was falsely identified as Bridgeman's.

Bridgeman's principal creditor Richard Long acquired ownership of the estate after a Chancery Decree in his favour in 1739. The diary of John Perceval, 1st Earl of Egmont says the following:

Sir Orlando Bridgeman who, instead of going to his government of Barbados conferred on his last winter, made his escape (as he hoped) from the world, to avoid his creditors, by pretending to make himself away, and accordingly gave it out that he had drowned himself, was ferreted out of his hole by the reward advertised for whoever should discover him, and seized in an inn at Slough, where he had ever since concealed himself.

Bridgeman was found in an inn at Slough in October 1738 and was imprisoned.

== Death and legacy ==
Bridgeman died at the gaol of Gloucester on 5 December 1746, aged 68, and was buried in St Nicholas' Church, Gloucester. He had three sons and two daughters. His eldest son Francis succeeded to the baronetcy on his father's apparent death in 1738. However, with his father restored, he predeceased his father in 1740 and the title became extinct with Bridgeman's death. Bridgeman's sister Penelope was married to Thomas Newport, 1st Baron Torrington.

Parliament of Great Britain
Preceded by Sir Christopher Hales, 2nd Bt; Thomas Gery	Member of Parliament for Coventry; 1707–1710; With: Edward Hopkins	Succeeded by Robert Craven; Thomas Gery
Preceded by William Northey; William Hedges	Member of Parliament for Calne; 1715–1722; With: Richard Chiswell	Succeeded by Benjamin Haskins-Stiles; George Duckett
Preceded by Lord Stanhope; Marquess of Hartington	Member of Parliament for Lostwithiel; 1724–1728; With: Henry Parsons 1724–1727; Sir William Stanhope Jan – Aug 1727; Darell Trelawny 1727–1728	Succeeded by Anthony Cracherode; Edward Knatchbull
Preceded by Sir William Clayton; Henry Herbert	Member of Parliament for Blechingley; 1727–1734; With: Sir William Clayton	Succeeded by Sir William Clayton; Sir Kenrick Clayton
Preceded by Sir George Downing; Thomas Wyndham	Member of Parliament for Dunwich; 1734–1738; With: Sir George Downing	Succeeded by Sir George Downing; William Morden
Government offices
Preceded by James Dotin, acting	Governor of Barbados; 1737–1738	Succeeded by Humphrey Howarth
Baronetage of England
Preceded by Orlando Bridgeman	Baronet (of Ridley); 1701–1746	Succeeded by (Francis Bridgeman)
