= Newport, Virginia =

Newport, Virginia may refer to several places:

- Newport, Augusta County, Virginia, an unincorporated community in Augusta County
- Newport, Giles County, Virginia, an unincorporated community in Giles County
- Newport, Page County, Virginia, an unincorporated community in Page County

== See also ==
- Newport (disambiguation)
- Newport News, Virginia, an independent city located in southeastern Virginia in the Hampton Roads region
