= John Bridgeman =

John Bridgeman may refer to:

== Politicians ==
- John Bridgeman (died 1523), MP for Exeter
- John Bridgeman (died 1729) (c. 1655–1729), of Prinknash, Member of Parliament for Gloucester
- John Bridgeman (American politician), member of the North Carolina House of Representatives

== Others ==
- John Bridgeman (judge) (1568/9–1638), of Prinknash, Chief Justice of Chester
- John Bridgeman (bishop) (1577–1652), English bishop of Chester
- Sir John Bridgeman, 2nd Baronet (1631–1710), of the Bridgeman baronets
- Sir John Bridgeman, 3rd Baronet (1667–1747), of the Bridgeman baronets
- John Bridgeman (sculptor) (1916–2004), British sculptor
- John Bridgeman (engineer) (1968–), British engineer

== See also ==
- John Bridgman, MP and Mayor for Hythe
