= Sir Orlando Bridgeman, 1st Baronet, of Ridley =

English baronet and politician (1649–1701)

Sir Orlando Bridgeman, 1st Baronet FRS

Member of Parliament for Horsham

1st Baronet, of Ridley (cr. 1673)
- In office 25 October 1669 – 24 January 1679
- Monarch: Charles II
- Preceded by: John Machell
- Succeeded by: Anthony Eversfield

Personal details
- Born: 9 December 1649 London, England
- Died: 20 April 1701 (aged 51) Coventry, England
- Resting place: Parish Church of St. Michael, Coventry
- Spouse: Mary Cave (m. 1670)
- Children: Sir Orlando Bridgeman, 2nd Baronet; Charlotte Bridgeman; Penelope Bridgeman
- Parents: Sir Orlando Bridgeman, 1st Baronet, of Great Lever (father); Dorothy Saunders (mother)
- Education: Magdalene College, Cambridge
- Occupation: Barrister, politician

Sir Orlando Bridgeman, 1st Baronet, FRS (9 December 1649 – 20 April 1701) was an English baronet and politician.

== Background ==
Bridgeman was the second son of Sir Orlando Bridgeman, 1st Baronet, by his second wife Dorothy, daughter of John Saunders. He was educated at Westminster College from 1662 and after two years went to Magdalene College, Cambridge. In 1669 Bridgeman was called to the bar by the Inner Temple.

== Career ==
Bridgeman entered the English House of Commons in 1669, having won a by-election for Horsham. He represented the constituency for the next ten years until the end of the Cavalier Parliament in 1679. King Charles II, created him a baronet, of Ridley, in the County of Chester on 12 November 1673.

In 1673 Bridgeman became Commissioner for Assessment in the county of Warwickshire, resigning in 1680. He held the same office in Coventry for two years from 1679. Additionally he served as Commissioner for Recusants in 1675, assigned to the county of Sussex. Bridgeman was elected a fellow of the Royal Society in 1696.

== Family ==
Aged twenty he married Mary Cave on 28 September 1670. She was the daughter of Sir Thomas Cave, 1st Baronet and four years his junior. The couple had two daughters and a son. Bridgeman died intestate in 1701 and was survived by his wife for few weeks, she dying on 8 June; both were buried in the Parish Church of St. Michael, Coventry, where a plaque was erected in her honour by her friend Eliza Samwell. As Coventry Cathedral, the church was destroyed during World War II.

Bridgeman was succeeded in the baronetcy by his son Orlando. His older daughter Charlotte (1681-3 March 1718) married Richard Symes of Blackheath as his second wife in 1703. Symes was the son of Thomas Symes Esq. (1617-22 January 1669), and grandson of John Symes, MP from Somerset.

His younger daughter Penelope was the second wife of Thomas Newport, 1st Baron Torrington, a younger son of Francis Newport, 1st Earl of Bradford, whose title later was revived for a descendant of Bridgemans older brother John.

== Notes ==
Parliament of England
Preceded by Sir John Covert, Bt; Henry Chowne	Member of Parliament for Horsham; 1669–1679; With: Sir John Covert, Bt	Succeeded by John Michell; Anthony Eversfield
Baronetage of England
New creation	Baronet (of Ridley); 1673–1701	Succeeded by Orlando Bridgeman
