= Custos Rotulorum of Shropshire =

This is a list of people who have served as Custos Rotulorum of Shropshire.

- Thomas Holte bef. 1544–1546
- Thomas Bromley 1546–1555
- Humphrey Onslow bef. 1562 – aft. 1564
- George Bromley bef. 1573–1589
- Sir George Mainwaring bef. 1594–1596
- Sir Richard Leveson 1596–1605
- John Egerton, 1st Earl of Bridgewater 1605–1646
- Interregnum
- Francis Newport, 1st Earl of Bradford 1660–1708
- Richard Newport, 2nd Earl of Bradford 1708–1712

For later custodes rotulorum, see Lord Lieutenant of Shropshire.
