= Robert Lloyd (1657–1709) =

English politician (1657–1709)

Robert Lloyd (1657 – 1 June 1709) was an English Tory politician. He sat as MP for Shropshire from 12 December 1699 till 1702 and 1705 till 1708.

== Family and education ==
Robert Lloyd was baptised 9 February 1657, he was the fourth but first surviving son of Thomas Lloyd (died 1692) and Sarah, the daughter of Francis Albany. With £3500, he married Mary, the daughter of Sir John Bridgeman, 2nd Baronet, the marriage was settled on 1 April 1684 and they had three sons and one daughter.

== Political career ==
Robert Lloyd supported the Tory Edward Kynaston in the county election in 1698 and succeeded Kynaston as a candidate when Kynaston died in May 1699. He was returned unopposed at the by-election on 12 December 1699 and again in the February 1701 general election. In December 1701, he stood with fellow Tory Roger Owen and was returned after a contest against two Whigs, one of whom was his brother-in-law Richard Corbet.

In 1705, he reached an electoral agreement with the Whig Sir Robert Corbet, 4th Baronet and was elected without contest. On 25 October 1705, he voted against the Court candidate for Speaker, John Smith instead supporting the Tory candidate, William Bromley.

On 20 February 1708, he was given a leave of absence to recover his health and in the 1708 general election, he did not stand.

== Death ==
He died on 1 June 1709 and was buried in the family chapel at Aston.
