= Richard Newport (MP) =

British politician

- Born: 28 July 1685
- Died: 3 December 1716 (aged 31)

Richard Newport (28 July 1685 – 3 December 1716), styled The Honourable from 1708, was a British politician.

== Background ==
Newport was the second son of Richard Newport, 2nd Earl of Bradford, and his wife Mary Wilbraham, daughter of Sir Thomas Wilbraham, 3rd Baronet. His older brother was Henry Newport, 3rd Earl of Bradford, his younger brother was Thomas Newport, 4th Earl of Bradford, and his uncle was Thomas Newport, 1st Baron Torrington. He died unmarried and childless in December 1716 aged 31.

== Politics ==
Newport entered the British House of Commons in a by-election in 1714, representing (Much) Wenlock as a member of parliament (MP) until 1715.

Parliament of Great Britain
Preceded by Sir William Forester; William Whitmore	Member of Parliament for (Much) Wenlock; 1714–1715; With: Sir William Forester	Succeeded by Thomas Newport; William Forester II
