= Newport, Ohio =

Newport is the name of several populated places in the state of Ohio, U.S.A.:

- Newport, Madison County, Ohio
- Newport, Mahoning County, Ohio
- Newport, Shelby County, Ohio
- Newport, Tuscarawas County, Ohio
- Newport, Washington County, Ohio
- Wayland, Ohio, Portage County, originally known as Newport
