= Newport East =

Newport East may refer to:

- Newport East, Rhode Island, a residential area adjacent to Newport, Rhode Island in the United States
- Newport East, a United Kingdom Parliament constituency
- Newport East, a Senedd constituency
