= Newport West =

Newport West may refer to:

- Newport West, a Senedd constituency
- Newport West, a United Kingdom Parliament defunct constituency replaced by Newport West and Islwyn in 2024
- Newport West railway station
