= Bridgeman baronets of Ridley (1673) =

Extinct baronetcy in the Baronetage of England

Bridgeman baronets
- Escutcheon of the Bridgeman baronets of Ridley
- Creation date: 1673
- Status: extinct
- Extinction date: 1746

The Bridgeman baronetcy, of Ridley in the County of Chester, was created on 12 November 1673 for Orlando Bridgeman, Member of Parliament for Horsham and younger son of the 1st Baronet, of the Great Lever creation. He was succeeded by his son, the 2nd Baronet. The latter was Member of Parliament for Calne, Lostwithiel, Blechingley and Dunwich.

== Bridgeman baronets, of Ridley (1673) ==
- Sir Orlando Bridgeman, 1st Baronet (died 1701)
- Sir Orlando Bridgeman, 2nd Baronet (died 1746)

=== The supposed third baronet ===
Francis Bridgeman (August 1713 – November or December 1740) was the only son of Sir Orlando Bridgeman, 2nd Baronet, and his wife Susanna Dashwood, daughter of Sir Francis Dashwood, 1st Baronet. Following his father's apparent drowning in 1738, Bridgeman was assumed to have inherited the baronetcy. Shortly thereafter though, his father, who had only feigned his death to avoid his creditors, was discovered in an inn and imprisoned. Francis Bridgeman died, unmarried and childless, aged only 27, on board a ship in Sir Chaloner Ogle's fleet, en route to the West Indies. He had not succeeded to the title, and it instead became extinct with the death of his father in 1746.

== See also ==
- Bridgeman baronets
