= Lord Lieutenant of Shropshire =

This is a list of people who have served as Lord Lieutenant of Shropshire. Before the English Civil War, the lieutenancy of Shropshire was always held by the Lord Lieutenant of Wales, but after the Restoration, its lieutenants were appointed separately. Since 1708, all the Lord Lieutenants have also been Custos Rotulorum of Shropshire.

== Lord Lieutenants of Shropshire ==
- see Lord Lieutenant of Wales for pre-English Civil War lieutenants
- Robert Devereux, 3rd Earl of Essex (appointed by Parliament) 1642 - 14 September 1646
- Francis Newport, 1st Earl of Bradford 26 July 1660 – 11 August 1687
- George Jeffreys, 1st Baron Jeffreys 11 August 1687 – 18 April 1689
- Francis Newport, 1st Earl of Bradford 11 June 1689 – 29 November 1704
- Richard Newport, 2nd Earl of Bradford 29 November 1704 – 10 May 1712
- Charles Talbot, 1st Duke of Shrewsbury 10 May 1712 – 12 November 1714
- Richard Newport, 2nd Earl of Bradford 12 November 1714 – 14 June 1723
- Henry Newport, 3rd Earl of Bradford 20 May 1724 – 23 December 1734
- Henry Herbert, 1st Earl of Powis 22 May 1735 – 13 March 1761
- William Pulteney, 1st Earl of Bath 13 March 1761 – 7 July 1764
- Henry Herbert, 1st Earl of Powis 16 August 1764 – 10 September 1772
- Robert Clive, 1st Baron Clive 4 November 1772 – 22 November 1774
- Edward Clive, 2nd Baron Clive 12 April 1775 – 30 March 1798
- George Herbert, 2nd Earl of Powis 30 March 1798 – 16 January 1801
- vacant
- Edward Clive, 1st Earl of Powis 18 May 1804 – 16 May 1839
- George Sutherland-Leveson-Gower, 2nd Duke of Sutherland 13 July 1839 – 14 November 1845
- Rowland Hill, 2nd Viscount Hill 14 November 1845 – 3 January 1875
- Orlando Bridgeman, 3rd Earl of Bradford 30 January 1875 – 25 July 1896
- George Herbert, 4th Earl of Powis 25 July 1896 – 3 August 1951
- Robert Bridgeman, 2nd Viscount Bridgeman 3 August 1951 – 20 March 1970
- Lt.-Col. Arthur Heywood-Lonsdale 20 March 1970 – 3 March 1975
- Sir John Dugdale 3 March 1975 – 1994
- Gustavus Hamilton-Russell, 10th Viscount Boyne 19 June 1994 – 14 December 1995
- Sir Algernon Heber-Percy 11 March 1996 – 2 January 2019
- Anna Turner 3 January 2019 – Present

== Deputy lieutenants ==
A deputy lieutenant of Shropshire is commissioned by the Lord Lieutenant of Shropshire. Deputy lieutenants support the work of the lord-lieutenant. There can be several deputy lieutenants at any time, depending on the population of the county. Their appointment does not terminate with the changing of the lord-lieutenant, but they usually retire at age 75.

=== 19th Century ===
- 2 April 1839: George Austin Moultri
- 10 March 1846: Henry Pinson Tozer Aubrey
- 10 March 1846: John Charles Burton Borough
- 10 March 1846: Peter Broughton
- 10 March 1846: George Brooke
- 10 March 1846: Robert Burton
- 10 March 1846: Robert Henry Cliency
- 10 March 1846: Saint John Chiverton Charlton
- 10 March 1846: Edward Corbett
- 10 March 1846: Edward Herbert, 3rd Earl of Powis
- 10 March 1846: John Whitehall Dod
- 10 March 1846: Thomas Campbell Eyton
- 10 March 1846: Granville Leveson-Gower, 2nd Earl Granville, KG PC
- 10 March 1846: William Ormsby-Gore, 2nd Baron Harlech
- 10 March 1846: Robert Gardner
- 10 March 1846: Richard Frederick Hill
- 10 March 1846: The Hon. Gustavus Frederick Hamilton
- 10 March 1846: Richard Henry Kinchant
- 10 March 1846: Sir Baldwin Leighton, 7th Baronet, Bt
- 10 March 1846: Ralph Merrick Leeke
- 10 March 1846: Joseph Venables Lovett
- 10 March 1846: Thomas Lovett
- 10 March 1846: Charles Kynaston Mainwaring
- 10 March 1846: Edward William Smythe Owen
- 10 March 1846: John Owen
- 10 March 1846: William Oakeley
- 10 March 1846: William Halsted Poole
- 10 March 1846: John Rocke
- 10 March 1846: Robert Aglionby Slaney
- 10 March 1846: Henry Cavendish Taylor
- 10 March 1846: Thomas Twemlow
