= Algernon Heber-Percy =

British landowner, farmer and public official

Sir Algernon Eustace Hugh Heber-Percy, KCVO (born 2 January 1944) is a British landowner, farmer and public official.

Heber-Percy was born in 1944, to Daphne Parker Bowles and the army officer Brigadier Algernon George William Heber-Percy (1904–1961), who remodelled a large part of the gardens at the Heber-Percy family's ancestral home, Hodnet Hall, Shropshire.

Having served in the Army for four years, Heber-Percy returned to live in Hodnet Hall in 1966; he studied agriculture at a local college and has managed the family's farming estates thereafter. He has also extensively renovated the house with his wife Jane, daughter of the 3rd Viscount Leverhulme. He has been involved in a number of organisations, including periods as a trustee of the National Gardens Scheme and as a member of the National Trust's regional committee. Since 1988, he has been president of the Shropshire and Mid Wales Hospice, now called Severn Hospice. In 1986, he was appointed a deputy lieutenant for Shropshire and served as high sheriff for the 1987–88 year; he was appointed vice-lord lieutenant in 1990 and then served as lord lieutenant from 1996 to 2019.

Heber-Percy retired as lord lieutenant in January 2019, at the age of 75. He had been appointed a Knight Commander of the Royal Victorian Order in 2014.

== Honours ==
- He was made a Knight Commander of the Royal Victorian Order on 31 December 2013 by Queen Elizabeth II. This affords him the title "Sir" and the post nominal letters "KCVO" for life.
- He was made a Knight of Justice of the Order of St John upon taking office as Lord Lieutenant of Shropshire. Within the order, this affords him the post nominal letters "KStJ" for life.
- He served as honorary colonel of 5th Battalion the Shropshire and Herefordshire Light Infantry from 1998 to 1999.
- He served as honorary colonel of the West Midlands Regiment from 1999 to 2005.
- In 2017 He was awarded the honorary degree of Doctor of Letters (D.Litt.) from the University of Chester.
