= Henry Newport, 3rd Earl of Bradford =

English peer and Whig politician

Harrison's Name Act 1735
- Act of Parliament
- Parliament of Great Britain
- Long title: An Act to enable John Harrison, an Infant, now called John Newport, and the Heirs of his Body, to take and use the Surname of Newport, pursuant to the Directions of Henry late Earl of Bradford, deceased.
- Citation: 9 Geo. 2. c. 1 Pr.
- Territorial extent: Great Britain

Dates
- Royal assent: 19 February 1736
- Commencement: 15 January 1736 (Note: Start of session.)

Status: Current legislation

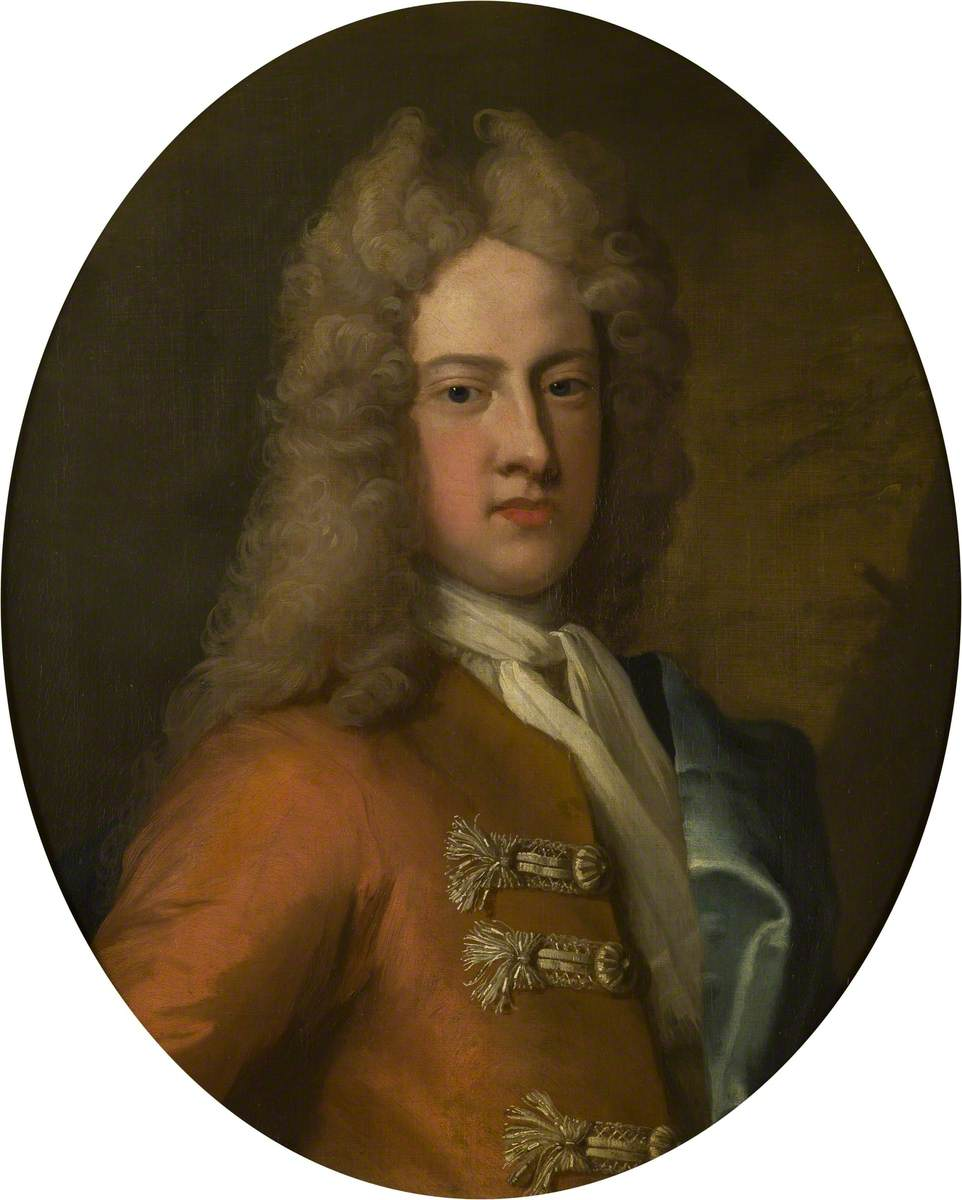
Henry, Viscount Newport (1683–1734), afterwards 3rd Earl of Bradford, painting by Michael Dahl

Henry Newport, 3rd Earl of Bradford (8 August 1683 – 25 December 1734) was an English peer and Whig politician who sat in the House of Commons between 1706 and 1722.

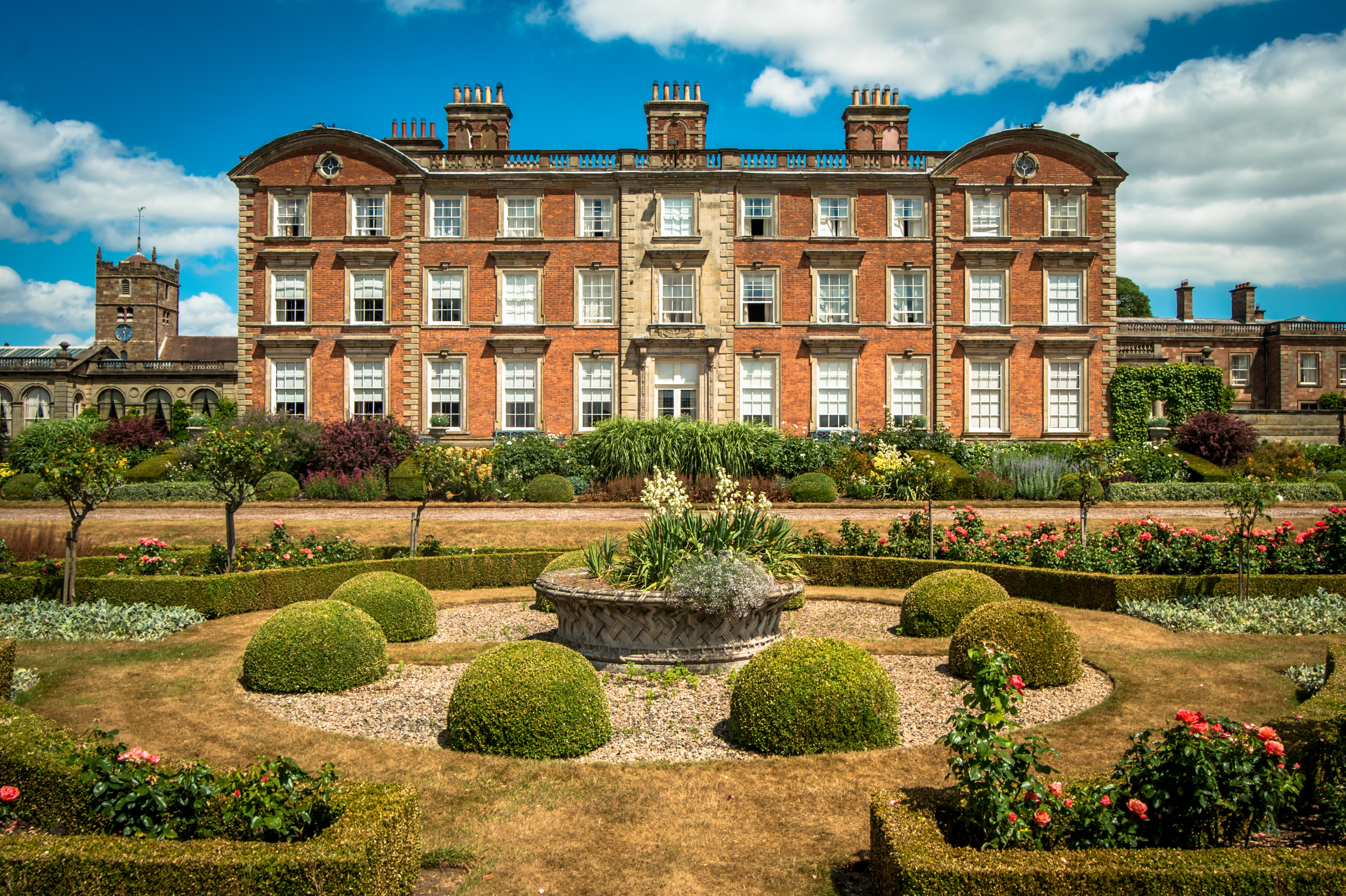
Weston Park, Staffordshire- seat of the Earls of Bradford

Newport was the eldest son of Richard Newport, 2nd Earl of Bradford and his wife Mary Wilbraham. He was educated at Westminster School and matriculated at Christ Church, Oxford on 4 May 1699 aged 15.

Newport was returned unopposed as Member of Parliament (MP) for Bishop's Castle at a by-election on 5 March 1706. At the 1708 general election, he was returned unopposed as MP for Shropshire but was defeated in 1710. He was again elected MP for Shropshire at the 1713 general election and at the 1715 general election but was defeated in 1722. He was Lord Lieutenant and Custos Rotulorum of Staffordshire between 1715 and 1725. During the Jacobite rising of 1715 he was colonel of a regiment of militia he raised in Shrewsbury.

Newport succeeded his father's titles on 14 June 1723. He was Lord Lieutenant of Shropshire and Custos Rotulorum of Montgomeryshire between 1724 and 1734.

Lord Bradford died in St James Place, London, on 25 December 1734 aged 51. He was unmarried, but father of an illegitimate son. He was buried on 20 January 1734/35 in Westminster Abbey, Westminster and was succeeded in his titles by his younger brother Thomas Newport, an imbecile who never married. The entailed estates such as Weston Park then passed to the 4th earl's sister Anne, who had married Sir Orlando Bridgeman, 4th Baronet.

The illegitimate son of Sir Henry, Lord Bradford was born John Harrison to Ann Smyth in 1720. His father died before John Harrison obtained his majority and the considerable unentailed estate left to him was administered by a committee chaired by his mother. In accordance with his late father's wishes, John Harrison changed his name to John Newport by a private act of Parliament, Harrison's Name Act 1734 (9 Geo. 2. c. 1 Pr.). His mother had him declared insane before he came into his inheritance and she remained in control of his fortune. Upon her death, William Pulteney, 1st Earl of Bath, controlled the estate. John Newport had no children per the official record, however this is disputed by a large number of descendants of one Samuel Newport and his two brothers, who emigrated to New Zealand in 1842 and were purportedly the great-grandsons of John Newport. This claim has only been supported by coincident records and oral history to date.

== Notes ==
Parliament of England
Preceded by Henry Brett; Charles Mason	Member of Parliament for Bishop's Castle; 1706–1707; With: Henry Brett	Succeeded by Parliament of Great Britain
Parliament of Great Britain
Preceded by Parliament of England	Member of Parliament for Bishop's Castle; 1707–1708; With: Henry Brett	Succeeded by Richard Harnage; Charles Mason
Preceded by Sir Robert Corbet, Bt; Robert Lloyd	Member of Parliament for Shropshire; 1708–1710; With: Sir Robert Corbet, Bt	Succeeded by Robert Lloyd; John Kynaston
Preceded by Robert Lloyd; John Kynaston	Member of Parliament for Shropshire; 1713–1722; With: John Kynaston 1713–1715; Sir Robert Corbet, Bt 1715–1722	Succeeded by Robert Lloyd; John Kynaston
Honorary titles
Preceded by The Lord Paget	Lord Lieutenant and Custos Rotulorum of Staffordshire; 1715–1725	Succeeded by The Earl Ferrers
Preceded by The Earl of Bradford	Lord Lieutenant of Shropshire; 1724–1734	Succeeded by Henry Herbert
Preceded by The Earl of Bradford	Custos Rotulorum of Montgomeryshire; 1724–1734	Succeeded by Henry Herbert
Peerage of England
Preceded by Richard Newport	Earl of Bradford; 1723–1734	Succeeded by Thomas Newport
