= Newport station =

Newport station may refer to:

== Australia ==
- Newport railway station, Melbourne, a railway station in Melbourne, Australia

== Canada ==
- Newport Station, Nova Scotia, a community in the Municipal District of West Hants

== United Kingdom ==
England

- Newport railway station (Essex), a railway station in Newport, Essex
- Newport railway station (Shropshire), a disused railway station in Newport, Shropshire
- Newport Pagnell railway station, a former railway station in Newport Pagnell, Buckinghamshire
- Newport (North Yorkshire) railway station, a former railway station on the Stockton and Darlington Railway.
- Wallingfen railway station, a former railway station in the East Riding of Yorkshire, originally known as Newport

Isle of Wight

- Newport bus station (Isle of Wight), the central bus terminus in Newport
- Newport railway station (Isle of Wight Central Railway), the demolished Newport hub of the Isle of Wight Central Railway's network
- Newport railway station (Freshwater, Yarmouth and Newport Railway), the demolished Newport terminus of the Freshwater, Yarmouth and Newport Railway
- Newport Pan Lane railway station, the temporary terminus of the Isle of Wight (Newport Junction) Railway

Scotland

- Newport-on-Tay East railway station in Newport-on-Tay, Fife
- Newport-on-Tay West railway station, another station in Newport-on-Tay

Wales

- Newport bus station, the central bus terminus in the city of Newport
- Newport railway station, a railway station in the city of Newport
- Newport Courtybella railway station, a temporary station in the city of Newport
- Newport West railway station, a proposed station in the city of Newport

== United States ==
- Newport station (Hudson–Bergen Light Rail), in Jersey City, New Jersey
- Newport station (Delaware), in Newport, Delaware
- Newport station (PATH), in Jersey City, New Jersey
