= Newport Center =

Newport Center or Newport Centre may refer to:

- Newport Center, Newport Beach, California, a business district
- Newport Center, Vermont, a census-designated place in the town of Newport
- Newport Centre (shopping mall), in Jersey City, New Jersey
- Newport Centre (Wales), a leisure centre
