= Newport Township =

Newport Township may refer to:

- Newport Township, Quebec, Canada
- Newport Township, Lake County, Illinois
- Newport Township, Johnson County, Iowa
- Newport Township, Barton County, Missouri
- Newport Township, Carteret County, North Carolina, in Carteret County, North Carolina
- Newport Township, McHenry County, North Dakota, in McHenry County, North Dakota
- Newport Township, Washington County, Ohio
- Newport Township, Pennsylvania
- Newport Township, Marshall County, South Dakota, in Marshall County, South Dakota
