= Newport, Madison County, Ohio =

Newport, Ohio
- Unincorporated community
- Location within Ohio Location within the United States
- Coordinates: 39°50′06″N 83°27′55″W
- Country: United States
- State: Ohio
- Counties: Madison
- Township: Paint
- Elevation: 1,070 ft (330 m)
- Time zone: UTC-5 (Eastern (EST))
  - Summer (DST): UTC-4 (EDT)
- ZIP Code: 43140 (London)
- Area code: 740
- GNIS feature ID: 1065147

Newport (sometimes historically called Walnut Run) is an unincorporated community in Paint Township, Madison County, Ohio, United States. It is located along Ohio State Route 38 between London and Midway.

== History ==
Newport was platted by Ephraim Freshour and William Coberly. The platting was recorded on June 17, 1837, although the actual platting was done at a much earlier date. In 1851, a steam-powered sawmill was built in the community, and the first store was opened in 1854. The Walnut Run Post Office was established on June 27, 1856, with James Gossard as the first postmaster. Historically, the town was called Walnut Run by some people, due to the post office having said name, although the community itself has always been called Newport. The post office was discontinued on December 16, 1859, but then re-established on February 25, 1867. As of 1875, the community contained two churches, two blacksmith shops, one wagon shop, two shoe shops, two grocery stores, and one sawmill. The post office changed its name to Walnutrun Post Office on July 1, 1895, and then discontinued on August 31, 1901. The mail service is currently sent through the London branch.

== Demographics ==
As of 1875, the community had a population of about 100, and still about 100 as of 1915.
