= Newport High School =

Newport High School may refer to:

== United States ==
- Newport High School (Arkansas)
- Newport High School (Kentucky)
- Newport High School (New Hampshire)
- Newport High School (Oregon)
- Newport High School (Pennsylvania)
- Newport High School (Bellevue, Washington)
- Newport High School (Newport, Washington)
- Newport Central Catholic High School, Newport, Kentucky
- Newport Harbor High School, Newport Beach, California

== Elsewhere ==
- Newport High School (Wales), Newport, Wales
- Newport Girls High School, a girls' grammar school in Newport, Shropshire, England
