= Richard Newport, 2nd Earl of Bradford =

English peer and Whig politician

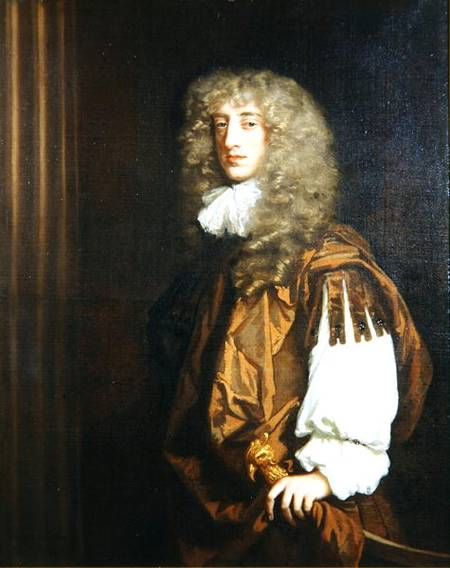
Portrait, oil of canvas, of Richard Newport, 2nd Earl of Bradford (1644–1723) by Sir Peter Lely (1618–1680)

Richard Newport, 2nd Earl of Bradford PC (3 September 1644 – 14 June 1723), styled The Honourable from 1651 to 1694 and subsequently Viscount Newport until 1708, was an English peer and Whig politician.

== Background ==
He was the oldest son of Francis Newport, 1st Earl of Bradford and his wife Lady Diana Russell, fourth daughter of Francis Russell, 4th Earl of Bedford. His younger brother was Thomas Newport, 1st Baron Torrington. In 1708, he succeeded his father as earl. Newport was educated in Christ Church, Oxford and graduated with a Master of Arts.

== Career ==
Newport entered the English House of Commons in 1670, sitting for Shropshire until 1685. He represented the constituency again between 1689 and 1698. In 1704, Newport was appointed Lord Lieutenant of Shropshire and in 1708 Custos Rotulorum of Shropshire, serving in these offices until 1712, whereafter both were held concurrently. Two years later, he was readmitted and exercised it until his death in 1723.

The latter period, Newport was also Custos Rotulorum of Montgomeryshire, a post he had previously occupied between 1701 and 1711. A year before he had been sworn of the Privy Council of Great Britain.

== Family ==
Lord Bradford died aged 78 in Soho Square, London and was buried at Wroxeter. On 20 April 1681, he had married Mary Wilbraham, younger daughter of Sir Thomas Wilbraham, 3rd Baronet, and had by her four daughters and four sons.

He was succeeded in his titles successively by his oldest son Henry and his third son Thomas. Richard, the second son, was a Member of Parliament and predeceased his father. Newport's second daughter Anne was married to Sir Orlando Bridgeman, 4th Baronet, and his third daughter Diane to Algernon Coote, 6th Earl of Mountrath.

Parliament of England
Preceded by Sir Francis Lawley, Bt; Sir Richard Ottley	Member of Parliament for Shropshire; 1670–1685; With: Sir Francis Lawley, Bt 1670–1679; Sir Vincent Corbet, Bt 1679–1681; William Leveson-Gower 1681–1685	Succeeded by Edward Kynaston; John Walcot
Preceded by Edward Kynaston; John Walcot	Member of Parliament for Shropshire; 1689–1698; With: Edward Kynaston	Succeeded by Edward Kynaston; Sir Edward Leighton, Bt
Honorary titles
Preceded by The Earl of Macclesfield	Custos Rotulorum of Montgomeryshire; 1701–1711	Succeeded by The Viscount Hereford
Preceded by The Earl of Bradford	Lord Lieutenant of Shropshire; 1704–1712	Succeeded by The Duke of Shrewsbury
Preceded by The Earl of Bradford	Custos Rotulorum of Shropshire; 1708–1712	Succeeded by The Duke of Shrewsbury
Preceded by The Duke of Shrewsbury	Lord Lieutenant and Custos Rotulorum of Shropshire; 1714–1723	Succeeded by The Earl of Bradford
Preceded by The Viscount Hereford	Custos Rotulorum of Montgomeryshire; 1714–1723	Succeeded by The Earl of Bradford
Peerage of England
Preceded by Francis Newport	Earl of Bradford; 1708–1723	Succeeded by Henry Newport
