= Thomas Newport, 4th Earl of Bradford =

English peer and noble

Thomas Newport
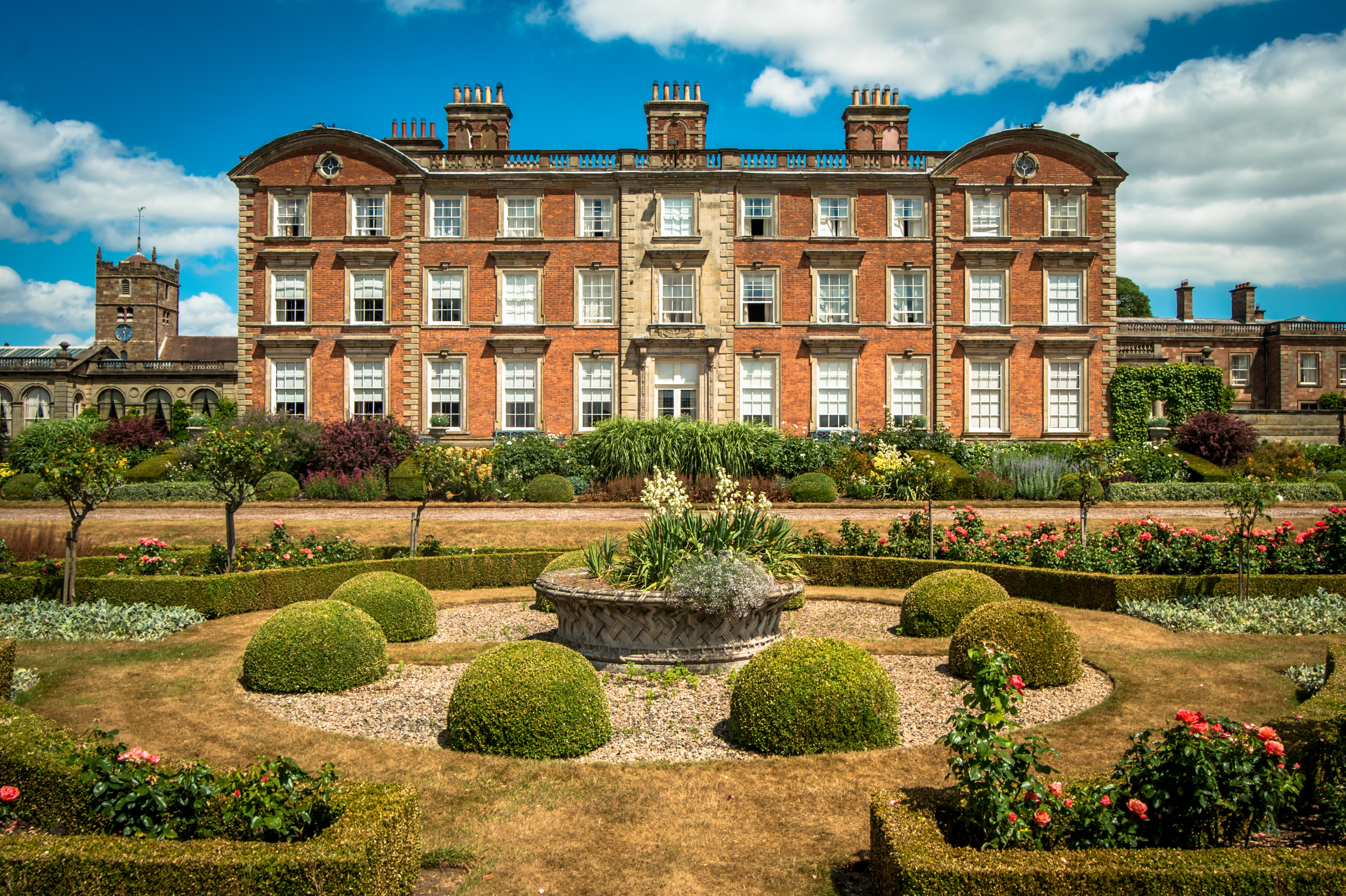
- Weston Park - seat of the Earls of Bradford

4th Earl of Bradford
- Title held: 1734 – 18 April 1762
- Predecessor: Henry Newport, 3rd Earl of Bradford
- Born: c. 1696
- Died: 18 April 1762
- Father: Richard Newport, 2nd Earl of Bradford

Thomas Newport, 4th Earl of Bradford (c. 1696 – 18 April 1762), was an English peer and noble.

Newport was the third son of Richard Newport, 2nd Earl of Bradford. His mother Mary was the third daughter of Sir Thomas Wilbraham, 3rd Baronet. After a fall from his horse in his youth, Newport suffered from feeble-mindedness for the rest of his life.

Richard, his father's second son and Member of Parliament, had died in 1716, and so on the death of his oldest brother Henry Newport, 3rd Earl of Bradford, in 1734, he succeeded in the titles and entailed estates, such as Weston Park, Staffordshire.

Newport died unmarried in Weston Park in Staffordshire. His estate, including the manor of Walsall, was transferred to his sister Diana, Countess of Mountrath, while all his titles became extinct.

In 1815, the earldom was revived for Orlando Bridgeman, a descendant of a daughter of the 2nd Earl.

== Notes ==
Peerage of England
Preceded by Henry Newport	Earl of Bradford; 1734–1762	Extinct
