= Francis Newport, 1st Earl of Bradford =

English soldier, courtier and Whig politician

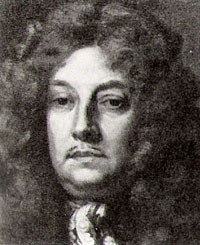
Contemporary portrait of The 1st Earl of Bradford

Francis Newport, 1st Earl of Bradford PC (23 February 1620 – 19 September 1708), styled The Honourable between 1642 and 1651, was an English soldier, courtier and Whig politician.

== Background ==
Born at Wroxeter, he was the eldest son of Richard Newport, 1st Baron Newport and his wife Rachel Leveson, daughter of Sir John Leveson (circa 1555 – 1615) and sister of Sir Richard Leveson (1598–1661). His younger brother was Andrew Newport. In 1651, he succeeded his father as baron. Newport was educated at Christ Church, Oxford.

In 1652, a volume of works by the late poet John Donne, were dedicated to Lord Newport by his son, also named John Donne.

== Career ==
He represented Shrewsbury in both the Short Parliament and Long Parliament. A royalist during the English Civil War, he fought in 1644 in the Battle of Oswestry on the side of King Charles I of England and was then imprisoned. After the restoration in 1660, Newport became Custos Rotulorum of Shropshire, fulfilling this office for his lifetime. In the same year, he had been appointed also Lord Lieutenant of Shropshire, but on the command of King James II of England was replaced by George Jeffreys, 1st Baron Jeffreys in 1687. After Jeffrey's death and the Glorious Revolution in 1689, Newport was restored as Lord Lieutenant until 1704.

Newport was Comptroller of the Household between 1668 and 1672. Subsequently, he was appointed Treasurer of the Household, a post he held a first time until 1686, and three years later again until his death in 1708. Newport was also Cofferer of the Household from 1689 until the death of King William III of England in 1702.

In 1668, he was sworn of the Privy Council of England, expelled in 1679 for his opposition to the government, but readmitted in 1689. On 11 March 1675, he was elevated to the peerage as Viscount Newport, of Bradford, in the County of Shropshire, his main home. On 11 May 1694, he was further honoured when he was created Earl of Bradford.

== Family and death ==
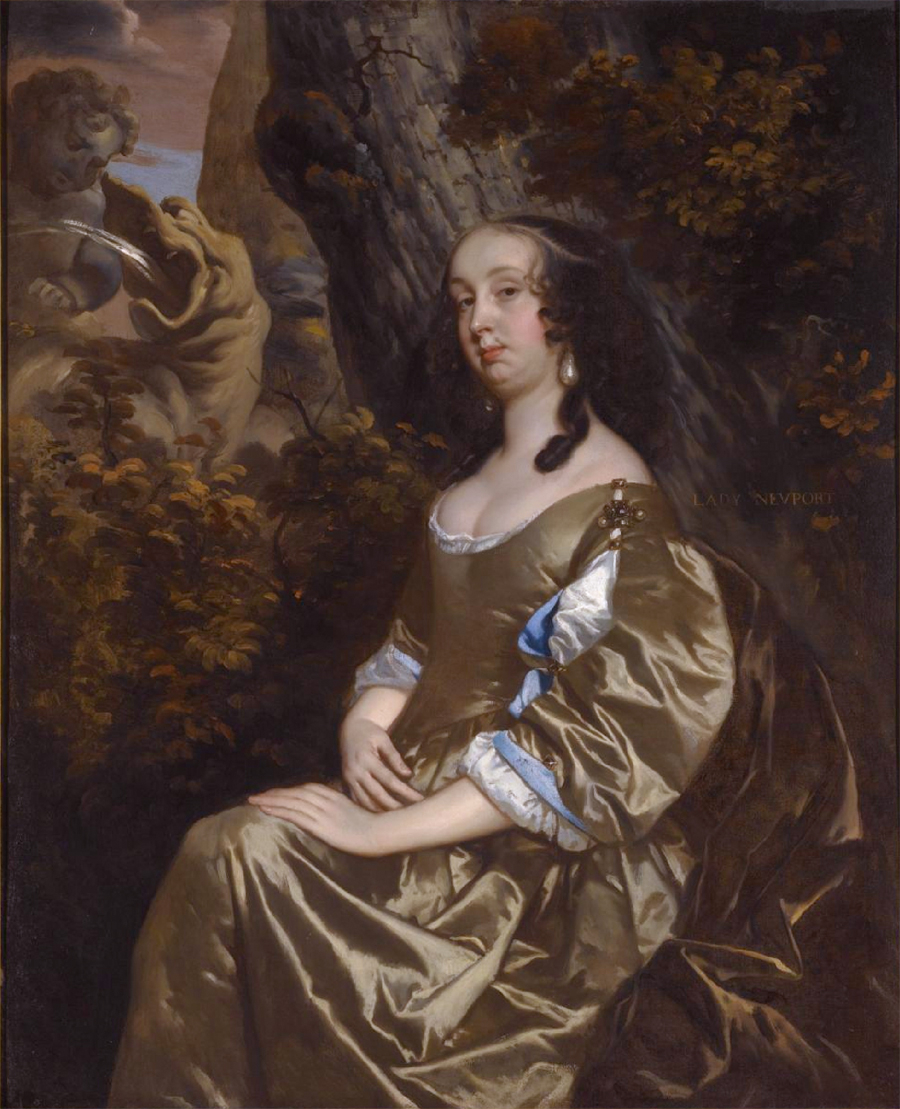
Diana Russel, Lady Newport (Peter Lely)

On 28 April 1642, Newport married Lady Diana Russell, fourth daughter of Francis Russell, 4th Earl of Bedford, at St Giles in the Fields, London, and had by her five daughters and four sons:

1. Richard Newport, 2nd Earl of Bradford (3 September 1644 – 14 June 1723)
2. Elizabeth Newport (1649 – before 1661), died young.
3. Francis Newport (1650), died young.
4. Katherine Newport (1653 – 24 April 1716), who married Henry Herbert, 4th Baron Herbert of Chirbury.She left funds on her death in 1716 to endow almshouses in Preston upon the Weald Moors, Shropshire, as a thanksgiving for her rescue when lost on the Alps.
5. Diana Newport (1654 – 30 January 1731), who married Thomas Howard. Her daughter, also named Diana married Edward Ward, 8th Baron Dudley.
6. Thomas Newport (1655 – 27 May 1719), 1st Barron Torrington.
7. Anne Newport (16 November 1659), died young.
8. Elizabeth Newport (2 June 1661 – 7 March 1724), who married firstly Edward Harvey, and secondly Sir Henry Lyttelton.

Newport died aged 88 in Twickenham.

He was buried in St Andrew's Church, Wroxeter, two weeks later and was succeeded in his titles by his oldest son Richard. His younger son Thomas was raised to the Peerage of England in his own right.

Political offices
Preceded by Sir Thomas Clifford	Comptroller of the Household; 1668–1672	Succeeded by The Lord Maynard
Preceded by Sir Thomas Clifford	Treasurer of the Household; 1672–1686	Succeeded by The Earl of Yarmouth
Preceded by The Earl of Yarmouth	Treasurer of the Household; 1689–1708	Succeeded by The Earl of Cholmondeley
Preceded by Sir Peter Apsley	Cofferer of the Household; 1691–1702	Succeeded by Sir Benjamin Bathurst
Honorary titles
English Interregnum	Lord Lieutenant of Shropshire; 1668–1672	Succeeded by The Lord Jeffreys
English Interregnum	Custos Rotulorum of Shropshire; 1660–1708	Succeeded by The 2nd Earl of Bradford
Preceded by The Lord Jeffreys	Lord Lieutenant of Shropshire; 1689–1704	Succeeded by The 2nd Earl of Bradford
Peerage of England
New creation	Earl of Bradford; 1694–1708	Succeeded by Richard Newport
New creation	Viscount Newport; 1675–1708	Succeeded by Richard Newport
Preceded by Richard Newport	Baron Newport; 1651–1708	Succeeded by Richard Newport
