= John Kynaston =

English politician (1664–1733)

John Kynaston (21 August 1664 – 10 September 1733) was an English Tory politician. He sat as MP for Shrewsbury from 1695 until 20 December 1709 and Shropshire from 1710 until 1715 and 1722 until 1727. He is the father of Corbet Kynaston and Edward Kynaston.

== Family and education ==
He was the first surviving son of Edward Kynaston and Amy, the daughter of Thomas Barker. He was educated at Eton College from 1679 till 1683. He was matriculated at St John's College, Cambridge in 1683. On 22 September 1686, he married Beatrice, the daughter of Sir Vincent Corbert, 2nd Baronet. They had two sons and one daughter. In 1703, she died and on 7 December 1703, his wife was buried. On 27 October 1708, he married his second wife, Anne, the daughter of Thomas Harwood and the sister of Thomas Hill, they had two sons and two daughters.

== Political career ==
From 1689 till 1690, he served as Sheriff of Salop. In 1695, he was returned unopposed for Shrewsbury alongside fellow Tory Richard Mytton. In 1696, he served as Mayor of Shrewsbury. In 1698, 1702, and 1708 he was re-elected to Shrewsbury. He was unseated from parliament after a disputed election petition on 20 December 1709. He was elected to Shropshire alongside Robert Lloyd in the 1710 general election.

In 1715, he lost his county seat, recovering it in 1722 after which he did not stand again.

== Later life and death ==
In 1731, he preferred an unsuccessful claim to the barony of Powys. He died on 10 September 1733, disinheriting his eldest son, Corbet of all except his entailed estates, in favour of his younger son, Edward. He was buried at Hordley.
