= Bridgeman baronets =

Baronets

There have been two baronetcies created for a person with the surname Bridgeman, both in the Baronetage of England.

- Bridgeman baronets of Great Lever (1660): see Earl of Bradford.
- Bridgeman baronets of Ridley (1673)
