= Thomas Newport, 1st Baron Torrington =

British barrister and politician

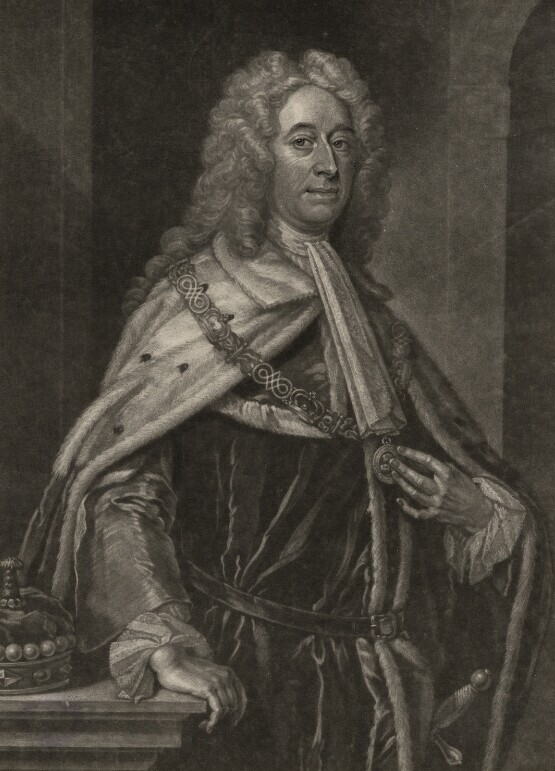
c. 1730 mezzotint of Torrington by John Faber the Younger

Thomas Newport, 1st Baron Torrington, PC (c. 1655 – 27 May 1719) was a British barrister and Whig politician who sat in the English and British House of Commons from 1695 until 1716 when he was raised to the peerage of Great Britain as Baron Torrington.

== Early life ==
Born in High Ercall c. 1655, Newport was the fifth and second surviving son of Francis Newport, 1st Earl of Bradford, and his wife Lady Diana Russell, daughter of Francis Russell, 4th Earl of Bedford. He matriculated at Christ Church, Oxford, on 21 May 1672, aged 17, and was called to the Bar by the Inner Temple in 1678 He became a reader of Inner Temple in 1700.

== Political career ==
At the 1695 general election, Newport was returned as Member of Parliament for Ludlow and also became a freeman of Ludlow. At the 1698 general election, he was initially defeated at Ludlow, but petitioned and was seated on 1 March 1699. In 1699 he was appointed to the post of Commissioner of Customs which he held until 1712. At the general election of January 1701, Newport was elected as MP for Winchelsea but irregularities in the poll resulted in the Mayor being imprisoned and the election declared void on 27 February 1701. There was no re-election before the November 1701 election at which Newport did not stand.

Newport returned to parliament at the 1715 general election, when he was returned unopposed as MP for (Much) Wenlock on the interest of his brother, Lord Bradford. Also in 1715, he was appointed a Lord of the Treasury and held this office until 1718. He vacated his seat at Wenlock in 1716, when he was raised to the Peerage of Great Britain as Baron Torrington, of Torrington, in the County of Devon on 20 June. Newport was sworn of the Privy Council of Great Britain on 30 March 1717. From March 1718, he served as one of the four Teller of the Exchequer until his death in 1719.

== Death and legacy ==
Torrington died on 27 May 1719 and was buried in Wroxeter. He married three times. His first wife was Lucy Atkyns, daughter of Sir Edward Atkyns. After her death in 1696, he married Penelope Mary Bridgeman, daughter of Sir Orlando Bridgeman, 1st Baronet, in Chelsea, London, on 22 July 1700. She died only five years later and he married thirdly Anne Pierrepont, daughter of Robert Pierrepont, on 8 July 1709. There were no children by any wife and on his death, the barony became extinct. He left his collection of paintings to his brother, Lord Bradford.

Parliament of England
Preceded by Silius Titus; Francis Lloyd	Member of Parliament for Ludlow; 1695–1698; With: Charles Baldwyn	Succeeded by Francis Herbert; William Gower
Preceded by Francis Herbert; William Gower	Member of Parliament for Ludlow; 1699–1700; With: Francis Herbert	Succeeded by Sir Thomas Powys; William Gower
Preceded by John Hayes; Robert Bristow	Member of Parliament for Winchelsea; January–November 1701; With: Robert Bristow	Succeeded by John Hayes; Robert Austen
Parliament of Great Britain
Preceded by Sir William Forester; Richard Newport	Member of Parliament for (Much) Wenlock; 1715–1716; With: William Forester	Succeeded by William Forester; Sir Humphrey Briggs
Political offices
Preceded by The Lord Onslow	Teller of the Exchequer; 1718–1719	Succeeded by Viscount Parker
Peerage of Great Britain
New creation	Baron Torrington; 1716–1719	Extinct
