= Roger Corbet (died 1395) =

English politician

Sir Roger Corbet (died 1395), of Moreton Corbet, Shropshire was a landowner and politician who was a knight of the shire for Shropshire in three Parliaments of England. He was involved in a series of complex and sharply contested property disputes with members of his own family.

Arms of the Corbet baronets of Moreton Corbet: Or, a raven sable Canting arms from French corbeau, a raven

== Background ==
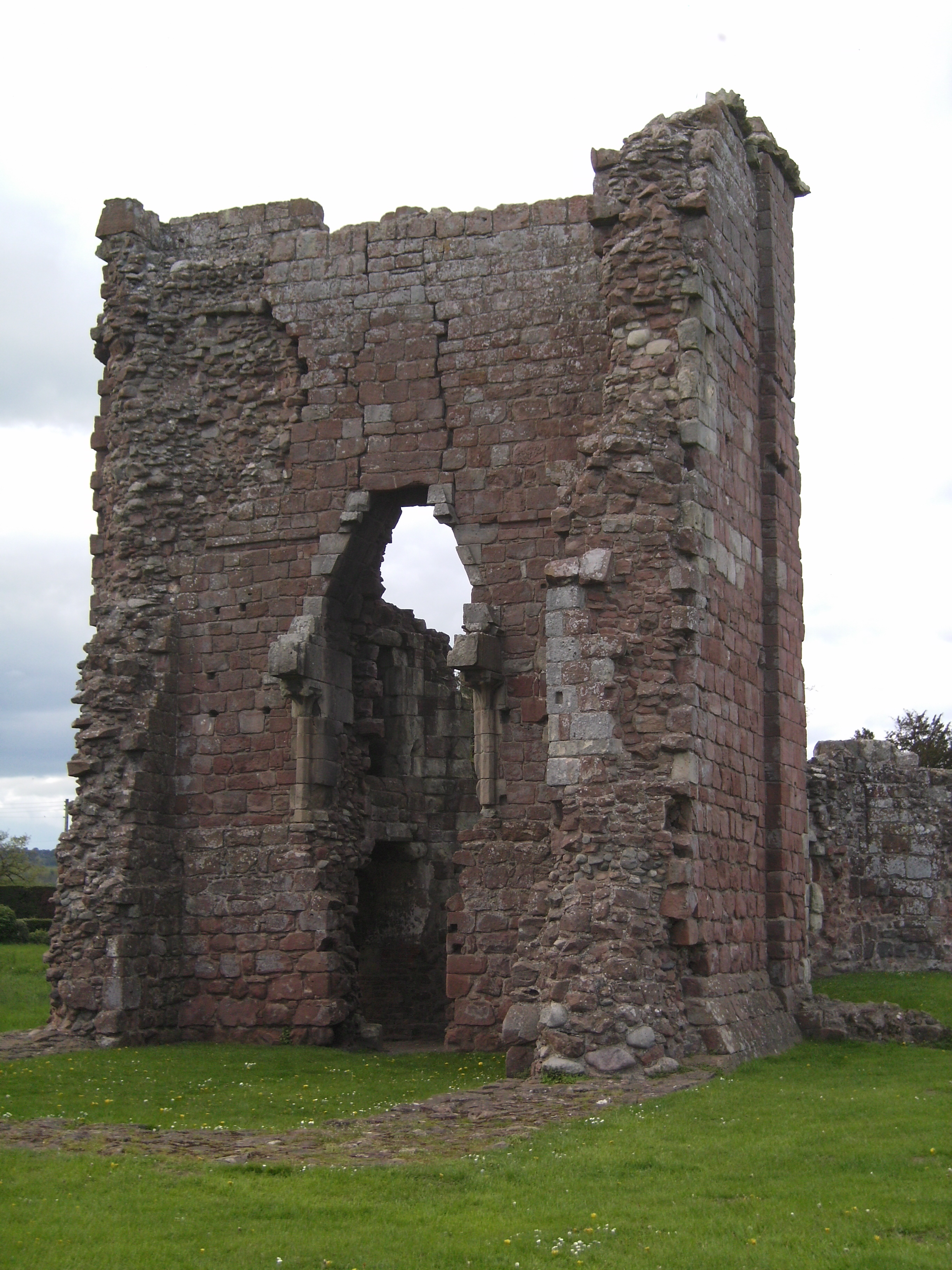
A remaining part of the medieval keep at Moreton Corbet. The castle was heavily modified in the mid-16th century by Sir Andrew Corbet and an entirely new building on the Italian model begun next to it by his son, Robert.

Roger Corbet was the third son of:

- Sir Robert Corbet (died 1375) of Moreton Corbet. The Corbets of Moreton Corbet were descended from the Corbet family of Caus Castle, who had been important landowners in the Welsh Marches from the time of William the Conqueror. The senior line of the Corbets at Caus had petered out in 1347 and the properties passed to Ralph de Stafford, 1st Earl of Stafford The cadet branch made their home at Moreton Corbet Castle, then a significant stronghold in north Shropshire.
- Elizabeth, daughter of Fulk, 1st Baron Strange of Blackmere. The Le Strange family were another important dynasty of Marcher Lords. Fulk le Strange was called to parliament by Edward II and served him as Seneschal of Gascony, a key post in the administration of the remaining Plantagenet possessions in France. The title could be passed through both male and female, and in 1383 it passed via female descent and marriage to the Talbot family, later to become Earls of Shrewsbury.

Roger Corbet had two older brothers, Thomas and Fulk, as well as a younger brother, John, and a sister, Joan. He inherited most of the family estates only because of a complex series of arrangements made by his parents. As the eldest son, Thomas, predeceased his parents, they were concerned to keep the estates in the Corbet family by preventing their going to Elizabeth, Thomas's daughter, who had married Sir John Ipstones, later twice MP for Staffordshire. Hence they initiated a series of transactions, some involving their daughters, intended to put most of the estates in tail, and favouring in particular Fulk and Roger. However, some of the provisions were mutually-contradictory, generating the disputes Roger pursued in the 1380s and 1390s. In fact, litigation began even before the death of Sir Robert. In 1374 Elizabeth and Ipstones went to the Court of Common Pleas to try to get possession of the manor of Braunstone in Leicestershire, which had been given to Thomas Erdington, the son of Roger's sister, Margaret.

== Landowner and litigant ==
When Sir Robert died in 1375, most of the estates passed to his eldest remaining son, Sir Fulk. His widow held as jointure a number of properties: the double manor of Lawley, both parts of which had been Corbet property since the previous century; Bletchley, where Elizabeth established a court leet; and Hopton Wafers, in the south of Shropshire. When she died, in 1381, these passed to Roger. Sir Fulk himself died in 1382 and the entailed estates also passed to Roger: Shawbury, Moreton Corbet, Habberley, Rowton and three other Shropshire manors. The unentailed Corbet estates were to go to Fulk's daughter, another Elizabeth, who was still a minor.

However, there were serious complications regarding four of the young Elizabeth's properties. Under a fine levied around 1363, Yockleton, Shelve, Wentnor and a fourth part of Caus Forest had been granted for life to Joan, Roger's sister, and her husband, Sir Robert de Harley. A year later, Joan and Harley had leased the properties to Sir Fulk for £60 per annum for the remainder of their lives, acknowledging that they were held of the king by knight service. By a third fine, around 1368, they had provided for the estates to pass to Roger in the event of Fulk's death. The death of Fulk exposed the inherent contradiction: Joan was still alive, so Fulk's heir could claim the estates under the second fine. However, Fulk's death raised Roger's expectation of gaining control, under the terms of the third fine. Worse still, Fulk's widow, yet another Elizabeth, claimed the properties as part of her jointure. Roger went to the Court of Chancery to try to vindicate his position, supported by Joan and Harley. Richard II's lawyers argued that the properties should escheat to the Crown while the young Elizabeth was still a minor. In 1384, Richard II commissioned an inquisition by Robert Belknap and Robert Charleton, which seems to have decided for the escheat. Roger Corbet then took legal action to recover the estates and gained them in 1385.

This was not the end, as Elizabeth attained the age of majority in 1390. She was now married to John Mawddwy or de la Pole, lord of Dinas Mawddwy, who raised the issue of the four estates again. Joan was now married to John Darras, and they took Corbet's side. As "strife and debate" was threatening to turn into something worse, the disputants were summoned on 23 June to appear in person before King and Council in Chancery, all being required to provide security for good behaviour in the very considerable sum of 200 marks each. After further delays, the disputed estates passed to the Mawddwys, and later to their daughter Elizabeth, who married Hugh Burgh, a future MP for Shropshire and Lord High Treasurer of Ireland.

By the late 14th century Shropshire's landowners had almost entirely withdrawn from actual cultivation of the land. Like most of their peers, the Corbets had rented out most of their demesne lands to tenants by the 1380s, under a variety of arrangements: tenancy at will, customary tenancies, sharecropping. The times were turbulent and uncertain and the Black death had made labour scarce, expensive, and hard to manage. Landed families were better off with a predictable income from rents than trying to exploit the land for themselves in the face of difficult conditions and volatile markets.

== Family tree ==
The family tree illustrates the main lines of descent involved in the property conflicts of the late 14th century.

The Corbets of Moreton Corbet: 14th Century

Katherine, daughter of John le Strange of Knockin and Myddle	Sir Robert Corbet (died 1300) of Moreton Toret and Wattlesborough	Matilda (died 1309), daughter John de Arundel
Amice	Thomas Corbet (died 1310) of Moreton Toret and Wattlesborough	Fulk Corbet, Canon of Lichfield Cathedral	John Corbet
Sir RobertCorbet (1304–75) of Moreton Toret and Wattlesborough	Elizabeth, daughter of Fulk, 1st Baron Strange of Blackmere
Robert de Harley	Joan Corbet	John Darras of Sidbury and Neenton	Elizabeth	Sir Fulk Corbet (died 1382) of Moreton Corbet	SIR ROGER CORBET (died 1395) of Moreton Corbet	Margaret Erdington (died 1395)
Elizabeth	Sir Thomas Corbet (died c.1359)	Margaret Corbet	Sir Thomas Erdington (died 1395) of Erdington
Alicia Harley	Sir John Ipstones (d.1394) of Blymhill	Elizabeth Corbet	John de la Pole of Dinas Mawddwy	Elizabeth Corbet, heiress to Wattlesborough	Sir Thomas Erdington (c.1371–1434) of Erdington	Robert Corbet (1383–1420) of Moreton Corbet	Roger Corbet (d.1430) of Shrewsbury

== Political and military career ==
Apart from the property dispute with his own family, there were few occasions when Corbet's behaviour gave cause for concern to the authorities. In general he was accepted as a good guarantor of others' goodwill. In 1378 he and Sir Fulk stood surety for James Audley, 2nd Baron Audley, a Staffordshire magnate who took custody of Whittington Castle, seat of the Barons FitzWarin, during the minority of the 5th Baron, and he stood as guarantor for Sir Fulk when he took over the farm of a Fitzwarin manor. By 1382, he was married to Margaret Erdington – part of a double link between the families, as his sister Margaret married his brother-in-law, Sir Thomas Erdington. However, while Sir Fulk lived, he was head of the family and Roger was a minor, if respected, figure in the county.

However, Roger Corbet was made a Justice of the Peace within a year of his brother's death and in the same year, 1383, was elected twice to the House of Commons in the Parliaments of February and August. Probably in the same year, the abbots of Shrewsbury Abbey and Haughmond Abbey acted as godfathers to his first son, Robert. Corbet was made Commissioner of Array in 1385 and by 1388 he had been knighted. It is possible he served overseas in the interim.

In 1391 he was again elected to Parliament. He was second to Sir Hugh Cheyne, a close friend of Corbet, who had supported him and Darras before the king in the previous year. Cheyne was probably an older and certainly a more experienced man: a veteran of war in Ireland and of at least six previous parliaments, and a supporter of Roger Mortimer, 4th Earl of March, whose family the Cheynes had long served.

== Death ==
However, Corbet's time as head of the family was fairly short. He died in September 1395 and his widow, Margaret, died only two months later. The heir, Robert, was below the age of majority and in 1397 his marriage and wardship were granted to Thomas Percy, 1st Earl of Worcester. However, Henry IV forced Worcester to relinquish the wardship to John Burley, a Shropshire MP and a retainer of Thomas FitzAlan, 12th Earl of Arundel.

== Marriage and family ==
Sir Roger Corbet married Margaret Erdington, daughter of Sir Giles Erdington of Erdington, Warwickshire. They seem to have had at least two sons and two daughters.

- Robert Corbet (1383–1420) of Moreton Corbet, Sir Roger's heir, was twice MP for Shropshire.
- Roger Corbet of Shrewsbury was MP twice for Shrewsbury and once for Shropshire.
- Joan Corbet
- Eleanor Corbet

== Footnotes ==
Parliament of England
Preceded by Thomas Whitton; Sir Richard Ludlow	Member of Parliament for Shropshire; 1391; With: Sir Hugh Cheyne	Succeeded by John Darras; Sir William Hugford
