= John Darras =

English soldier, politician and landowner

Sir John Darras

Member of the English Parliament for Shropshire
- In office 20 January 1393 – 10 February 1393 Serving with Sir William Hugford
- Preceded by: Sir Hugh Cheyne, Sir Roger Corbet (died 1395)
- Succeeded by: Sir Adam Peshale, Sir William Hugford
- In office 6 October 1404 – 13 November 1404 Serving with John Burley
- Preceded by: John Burley, George Hawkestone
- Succeeded by: David Holbache, Thomas Whitton

Personal details
- Born: c. 1355
- Died: March 1408 Neenton
- Cause of death: Suicide by hanging
- Spouse: Joan Corbet (died c. 1400)
- Relations: Sir Roger Corbet (brother-in-law)
- Occupation: Landowner, soldier.

John Darras (c.1355–1408) was an English soldier, politician and landowner, who fought in the Hundred Years' War and against the Glyndŵr Rising. A client of the FitzAlan Earls of Arundel, he served them in war and peace, helping consolidate their domination of his native county of Shropshire. He represented Shropshire twice in the House of Commons of England. He died by his own hand.

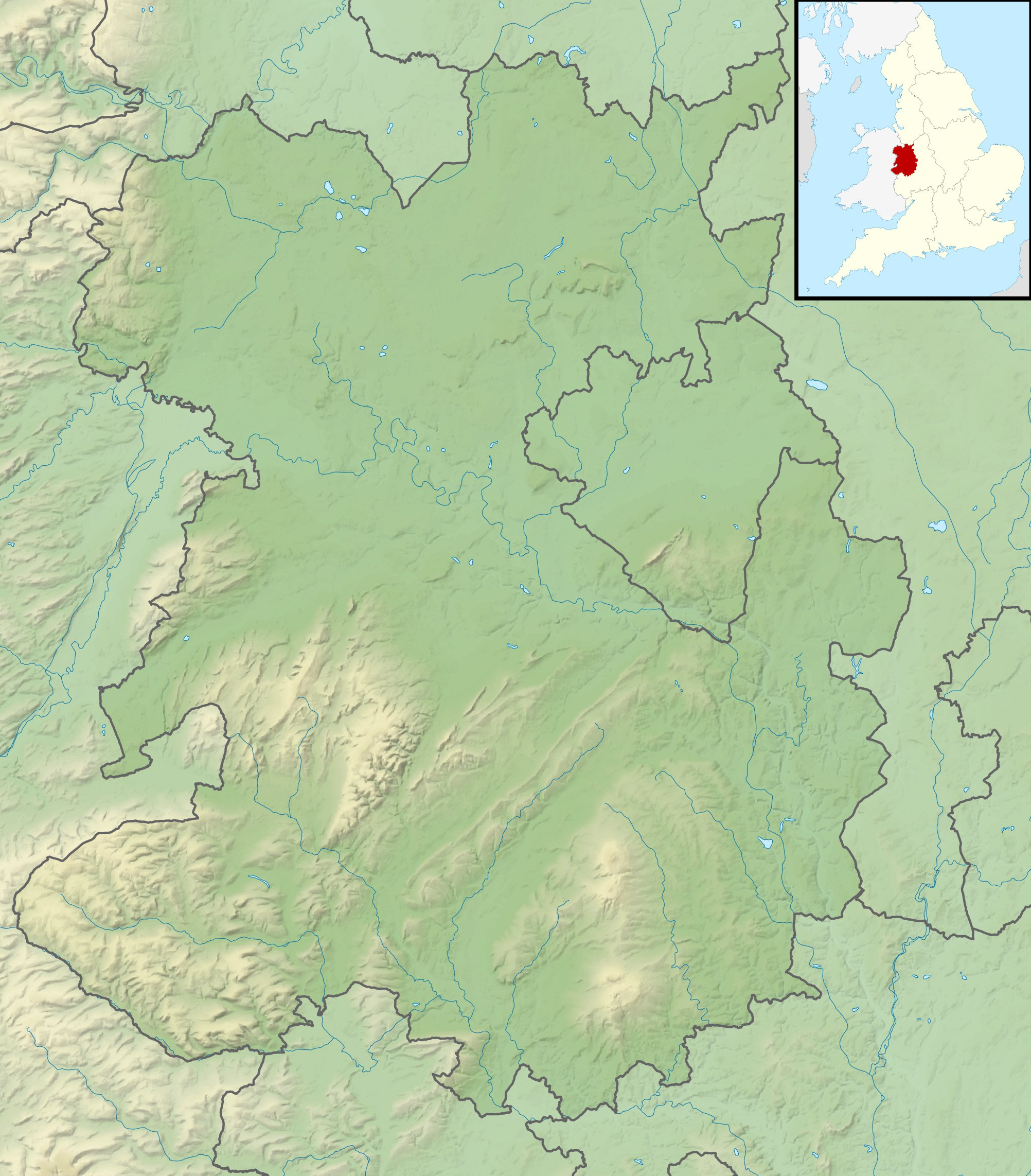
Relief map of Shropshire and surrounding counties to show estates held or claimed by John Darras (blue dots) and his wife, Joan Corbet (red dots). Estates disputed with the Mawddwys are shown in pink.

== Background and early life ==
John Darras was the son of: Ralph Darras or Daras of Neenton and Joan Forcer, daughter and coheiress of Thomas Forcer, and, together with her sisters Burga and Elizabeth, coheiress of Sir Henry Ribbesford of Ribbesford, near Bewdley in Worcestershire, who was the brother of their grandmother, Avice or Hawise le Forcer. The Darras family were not large landowners but part of the emerging landed gentry. Ralph Darras held the manors of Neenton and Sidbury, both south-west of Bridgnorth in Shropshire, part of the Welsh Marches. Although most such families were of Anglo-Norman origin, Darras, originally rendered de Arras, or d'Arras, signifies origins in Arras, historically the chief town of Artois in Flanders. It is generally rendered Daras in late medieval documents.

Ralph Darras, John's father, died in December 1461, when John was only about seven years of age. This was during the second major outbreak of the Black Death in Shropshire, although there is no record of Ralph Darras's cause of death. The plague brought great economic shifts alongside the human cost. Shropshire inquisitions post mortem taken during the plague outbreak show that land lay uncultivated and some landowners struggled to pay even very modest rents, and some estates were considered worthless. While the majority of the rural population was placed at an advantage by labour shortages, landlords were forced to relax conditions imposed on tenants and to buy in labour. This is the economic and agrarian background to John Darras's lifelong struggles to consolidate and extend his estates and to find additional sources of income, mainly through business and military service.

John Darras's mother, Joan, must also have died in his childhood. He fought legal battles to secure her inheritance, but alongside his aunts, not his mother.

== Landowner ==
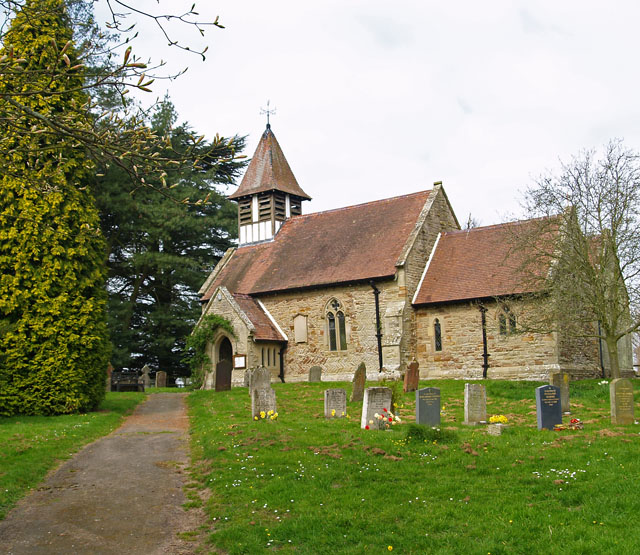
Holy Trinity church at Sidbury, Shropshire. The nave was already old by the time of Darras, as it was built in the 12th century, although the whole building underwent restoration in 1881.

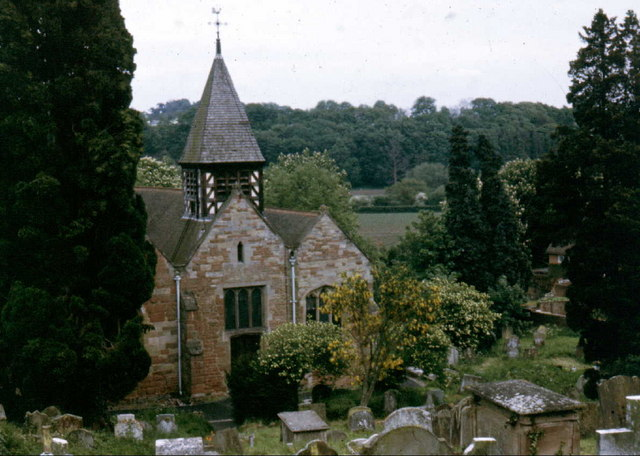
St Leonard's church at Ribbesford. The manor was the focus of early attempts by Darras to enlarge his holdings. There has been a small church on the site since about 1100. It was enlarged from the early 15th century, with modifications including the present nave.

The inquisition following his father's death, taken at Bridgnorth on 19 March 1362, shows that the main estates Darras inherited from his father were the manors of Sidbury and Neenton, which were held of Edmund Mortimer, 3rd Earl of March. in return for providing a hobelar (a light cavalryman mounted on a hobby) for Wigmore Castle when there was war in the Welsh Marches. There were also a few other small, scattered holdings, notably a third of the manor of Linley, held of the Prior of Wenlock. This was a small patrimony and Darras fought legal battles, sometimes backed by force, at several points in his life to extend his holdings, although with limited success.

In 1379, and again in 1383, Darras and his aunts Burga and Elizabeth contested ownership of the manors of Ribbesford and Rock, Worcestershire, which had been held by Sir Henry Ribbesford, also under the Mortimers of Wigmore. They were opposed by John de Resunden, the husband of their distant relative, Iseult. They won their suit but for reasons unknown the estates were both soon in the hands of Thomas de Beauchamp, 12th Earl of Warwick, one of the Lords Appellant, who was temporarily stripped of all his lands during Richard II's counter-coup of 1397.

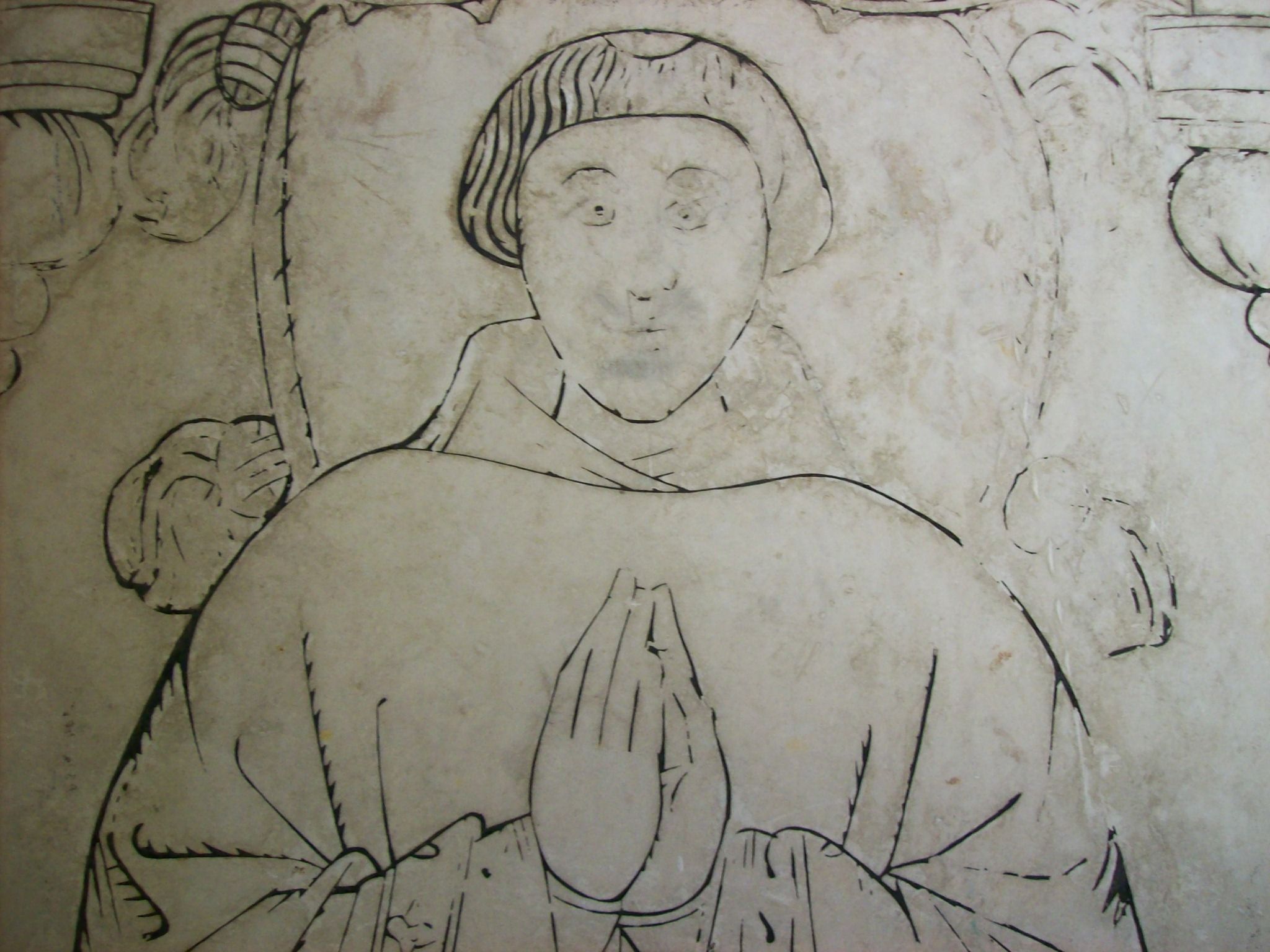
A medieval monk, depicted on a gravestone at Rock. The church was monastic property.

Patronage of the churches on most of these estates, potentially a lucrative right, went to Darras. The rectory of Sidbury was in his gift and he is known to have made presentations to it. On 16 June 1386 Darras authorised an exchange of clergy, by which the local priest went to St Katherine's chapel in Hereford Cathedral and the former cathedral chaplain, Philip Kentles, became rector of Sidbury. St Katherine's chapel served the Bishop's Palace, so this exchange must have been of importance to John Gilbert, presumably earning Darras a modicum of episcopal favour. In April 1392 Darras appointed a successor after Philip's death. At Neenton too Darras held and used the advowson, presenting Roger Murimore as incumbent of the church in November 1399. Linley's church was a chapel of Holy Trinity Church in Much Wenlock, which was in the hands of Wenlock Priory, the feudal overlord, leaving Darras with no control. However, while he had effective control of Ribbesford, the advowson must have been his to exercise, as it went with the manor. In the case of Rock, however, the principal manor in the parish was not Rock itself but Alton, and the advowson of the church went with it: although there had been challenges from the Ribbesford family, the advowson was held by the Abbey of Saint-Evroul in Normandy during the 14th century.

As a substantial, if not grand, landowner, Darras was evidently enjoyed a degree of trust among the local landed gentry. He is known to have acted for others in land transactions, including Malcolm de la Mare, Thomas Whitton and John Meisy. His business associates tend to recur as personal and family allies throughout his known career.

Family tree to illustrate the Ribbesford property disputes

Derived from the table given by Wrottesley. and further information from the Victoria County History.

Henry de Ribbesford	Hawise
Juliana	John the Elder	Walter	Constance	John the Younger	Thomas	Thomas le Forcer
Isolda or Iseult	Walter	Roger	Burga	Elizabeth	Joan	Ralph Darras
Iseult	John de Resunden	John Darras

== Marriage and family ==
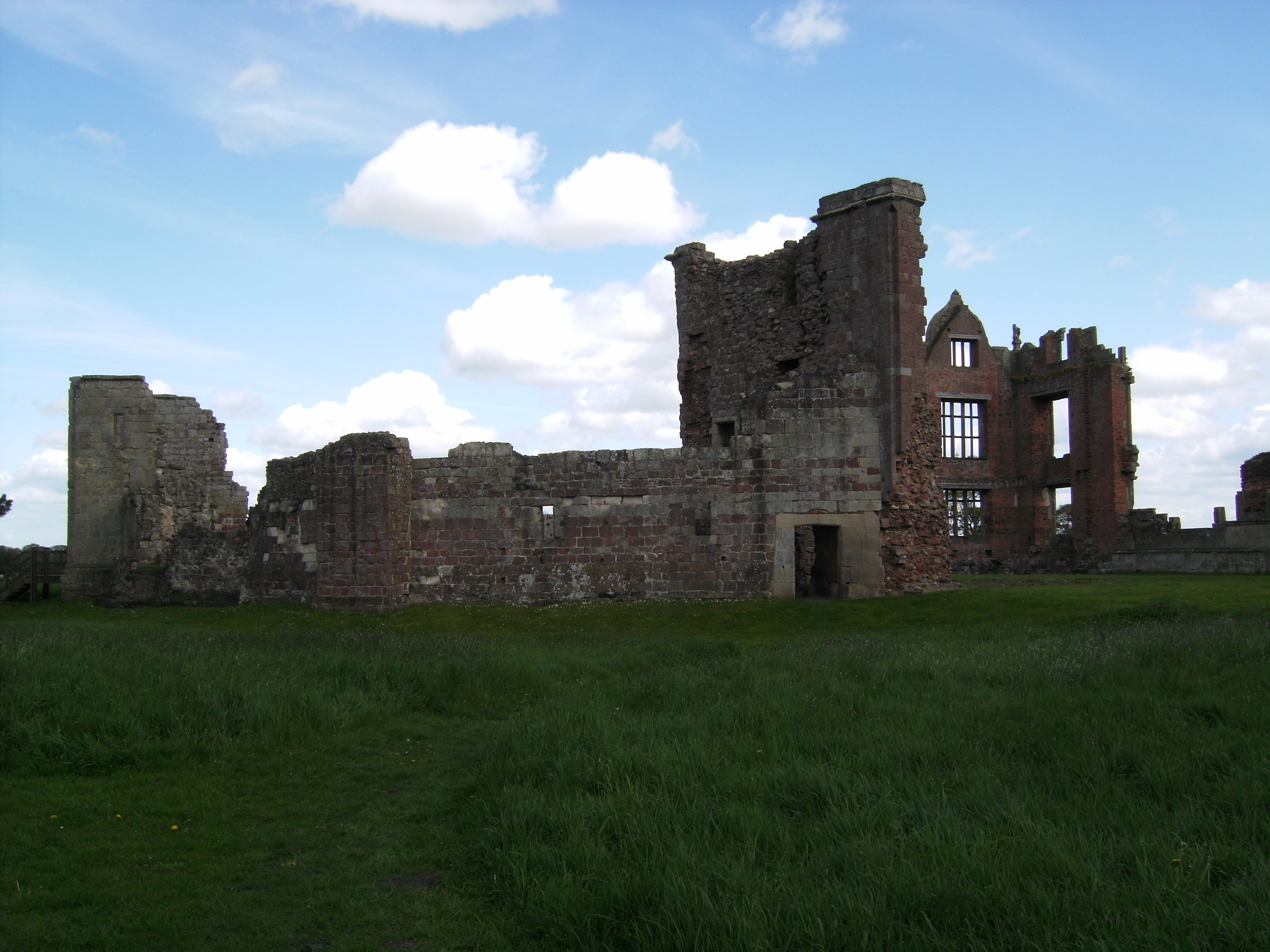
Remains of the medieval keep at Moreton Corbet Castle, with the curtain wall curving around to the gatehouse, restored in the mid-16th century on the right. On the right are remains of the Elizabethan house. The Corbets of Moreton Corbet were themselves powerful allies but also, like Darras, found further security in the Arundel affinity.

Darras married Joan Corbet. The marriage took place before 1390. However, as Darras is not recorded as active on Joan's behalf in the Corbet property disputes of 1385, it must have been in the second half of the 1380s. Darras formally entered the Arundel affinity in 1387, which may coincide approximately with his marriage.

Joan Corbet was the daughter of Sir Robert Corbet (died 1375) of Moreton Corbet, and Elizabeth Le Strange, daughter of Fulk, 1st Baron Strange of Blackmere. The Corbets of Moreton Corbet had taken over as the senior line of Corbets in the region, as the Corbets at Caus Castle had petered out in 1347. The Le Strange family were another important dynasty of Marcher Lords with many branches. The Blackmere barony was of fairly recent foundation. Elizabeth's father was called to parliament by Edward II and served him as Seneschal of Gascony, the head of the administration of the remaining Plantagenet possessions in France. The title could be passed through both male and female, and the tortuous line of descent of the Le Stranges may have been one of the factors predisposing the Corbets towards reinforcing male primogeniture through dubious property transactions. From 1383 it passed via female descent and marriage to the Talbot family, and was one of the many titles collected together by John Talbot, Baron Furnivall and later Earl of Shrewsbury.

Joan was the widow of Robert de Harley of Willey and had a daughter and heiress, Alice, who married Sir Hamo Peshall or Hamon Peshale. Joan brought a range of properties, acquired from her own family and her first husband, which must have greatly increased Darras's comfort and security while she was alive. She had a considerable amount of jointure property from her first marriage – in Shropshire at Harley, Gretton, Willey and Kenley, and in Worcestershire part of a manor at Hampton Lovett, known as Over Hall. Some of these properties passed to Roger Willey, a relative of Sir Robert Harley, in 1400, presumably on Joan's death: Willey was a business associate of Darras. The Hampton Lovett property, however, was destined for Alice, Joan and Robert Harley's daughter, who married Sir Hamo Peshall.

Joan was almost certainly some years older than Darras. It is not clear whether they had children, although Darras may have left a son named Roger. Joan seems to have died around the turn of the century, with her properties largely leaving his control, prompting Darras to an active and fairly successful search for further sources of income in the years following.

Joan's family, the Corbets of Moreton Corbet Castle were one of the rising gentry families, steadily increasing their estates and their influence. However, they were not of the first rank, and both they and Darras were increasingly to seek advancement through the affinity of the FitzAlans, the Earls of Arundel, who were supreme both economically and politically in Shropshire as well being among the greatest magnates in England.

== The Corbet property disputes ==
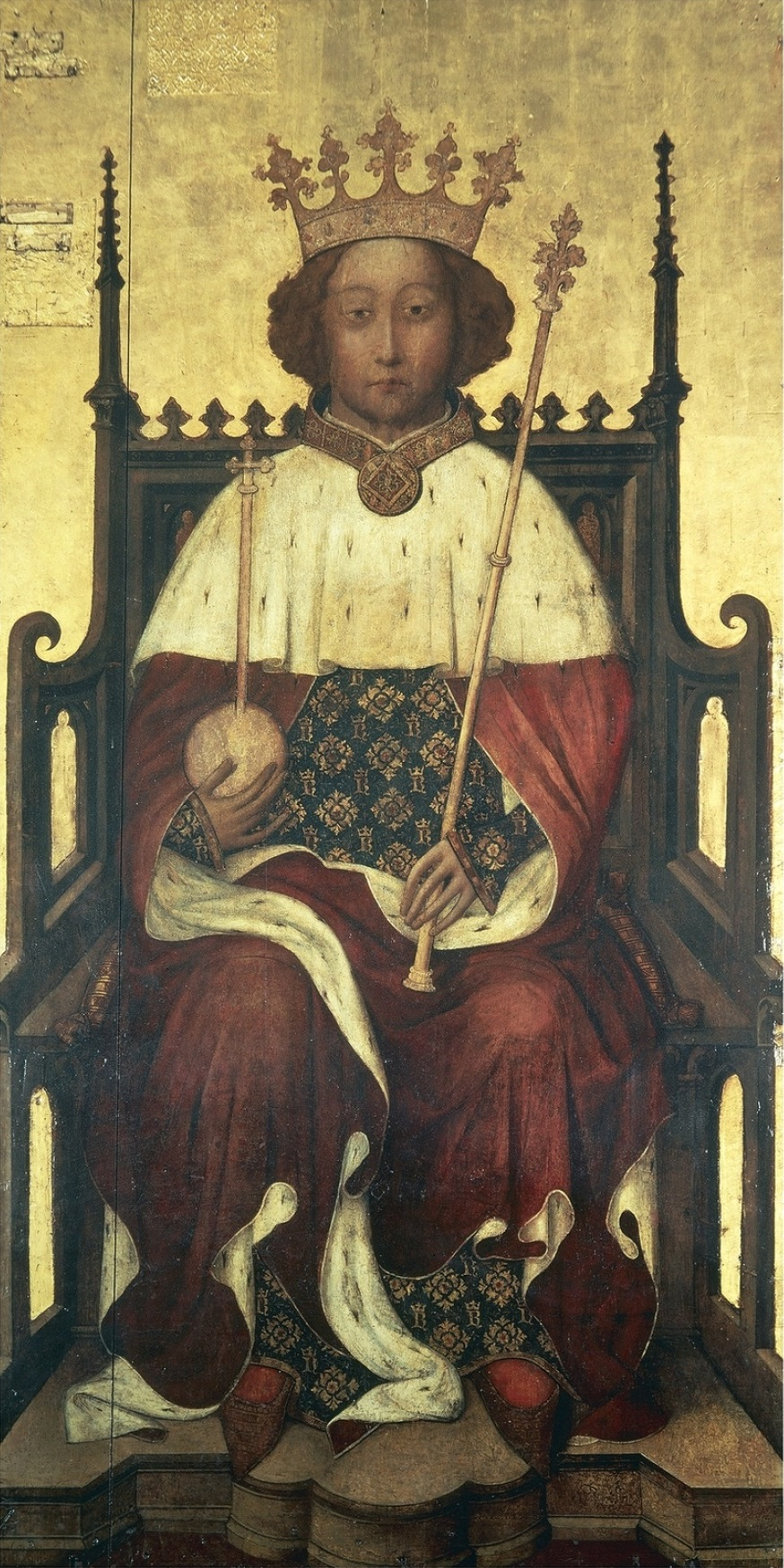
Richard II, who intervened in and profited from the Corbet property disputes.

Joan Corbet's brother, Sir Roger, was preoccupied with family disputes over property, many of which involved Joan. Darras inevitably took his wife's side, sometimes bringing him into disrepute with the king and his government.

Roger Corbet had two older brothers, Thomas and John, as well as a younger brother, John, and sisters, including Joan, who was possibly the eldest of the siblings. Roger and Joan's parents, Robert and Elizabeth Corbet, had been concerned to keep the family estates together in a time of short life-spans and tortuous succession that affected many landowning families. As the eldest son, Thomas, predeceased his parents, the initial target had been to prevent the estates going to Elizabeth, his daughter, who had married Sir John Ipstones, a quarrelsome and sometimes violent man who served twice as MP for Staffordshire. In the 1360s they initiated a complex series of property transactions, using the device of fine of lands, and intended to keep the bulk of the Corbet lands effectively in tail, favouring in particular Fulk and Roger. The provisions of these fines were contested by Ipstones and Elizabeth from the outset. However, after the death of Fulk in 1382, much worse followed. Some of the provisions were revealed as mutually-contradictory. Fulk's daughter and sole heiress, also Elizabeth, contested effective ownership of property that had been assigned for life, under a fine of 1363, to Joan and her first husband, Sir Robert Harley of Willey, who died around 1370, with the remainder to Fulk and the heirs of his body. These lands at Yockleton, Shelve, Wentnor and Caus Forest, were all on the western side of Shropshire, close to the Welsh border and Joan and Harley leased them for the remainder of their lives to Sir Fulk for a rent of £60 a year. However, in 1367, they levied a fine to ensure estates passed to Roger in the event of Fulk's death. As Joan was still alive when Sir Fulk died in 1382, his daughter, Elizabeth, had a reasonable expectation of continuing to lease the lands under the fine of 1363. Joan, however, intended the lands to go immediately to her younger brother, Roger, according to the fine of 1367. She had reiterated the position after Harley's death in a new fine in 1376, and this position was assumed by the inquisition post mortem following Sir Fulk's death. There was a series of legal claims and counter-claims, with the Crown intervening to try to secure an escheat while the young Elizabeth was still a minor. However, Roger emerged victorious in 1385.

When Elizabeth, Fulk's daughter attained the age of majority in 1390, the entire issue was re-opened. Elizabeth was now married to John Mawddwy or de la Pole, lord of Dinas Mawddwy, who vigorously pursued his wife's claim. Darras, now married to Joan, was just as vigorous in pursuing the interests of Joan and her brother, Roger. The king, Richard II was informed that "strife and debate" was threatening the peace in Shropshire. It seems that violence had broken out at the beginning of June. It is unlikely that Darras, already an experienced fighting man, was uninvolved, as on 7 June 1390 he was the first of those ordered to appear before King Richard II and his Council in Chancery on 23 June, on pain of forfeiting 200 marks. Writs in the same terms were issued to seven others, including Sir Roger Corbet and Malcolm de la Mare, Darras's business associate and recently MP for Herefordshire. A further writ to the Sheriff ordered him to compel their attendance. However, the arrangements for the court appearance were changed and on 22 June writs were issued, this time naming Joan as well as John Darras, ordering the quarrelling gentry to appear instead at the next Shrewsbury assizes before Sir Robert Charleton. Charleton and Sir John Hill were authorised to take security for good behaviour from them and to familiarise themselves in advance with the complexities of the case. The delay was accompanied by an order for Edward Acton, the Shropshire escheator personally to take the disputed estates into the king's hands, pending a resolution. After further delays, which were very profitable to king who was pocketing the proceeds, an agreement was reached and on 25 April 1391 the escheator was ordered to cease meddling with the estates. It seems they were assigned to the Mawddwys, and later to their daughter Elizabeth, who married Hugh Burgh, a future MP for Shropshire and Lord High Treasurer of Ireland. However, it is likely that Joan and Darras received the consolation of regular rent from them. While losing the case was a blow to prestige, leasing was actually the preferred option among Shropshire landowners like the Corbets, who had been renting out demesne lands to secure a regular income in uncertain times. It is also possible that there was a large sum for Joan and John Darras at the outset of the tenancy: the Recognizances preserved in the county archives show that in September 1391 John de Mowche (presumably a rendering of Mawddwy, which is given as Mouthe in the Close Rolls) undertook to pay John Darras 1000 marks at Easter 1392.

Family tree to illustrate the Corbet property disputes

Based on pedigrees derived from the Heraldic Visitation of Shropshire, 1623, and in Augusta Corbet's family history, supplemented by more recent information from the History of Parliament Online.

Katherine, daughter of John le Strange of Knockin and Myddle	Sir Robert Corbet (died 1300) of Moreton Toret and Wattlesborough	Matilda (died 1309), daughter John de Arundel
Amice	Thomas Corbet (died 1310) of Moreton Toret and Wattlesborough	Fulk Corbet, Canon of Lichfield Cathedral	John Corbet
Sir RobertCorbet (1304–75) of Moreton Toret and Wattlesborough	Elizabeth, daughter of Fulk, 1st Baron Strange of Blackmere
Robert de Harley	Joan Corbet	John Darras of Sidbury and Neenton	Sir Fulk Corbet (died 1382) of Moreton Corbet	Elizabeth	Roger Corbet (died 1395)	Margaret Erdington (died 1395)
Elizabeth	Sir Thomas Corbet (died c.1359)	Margaret Corbet	Sir Thomas Erdington (died 1395) of Erdington
Alicia Harley	Sir Hamon Peshale (died c.1398)	Elizabeth Corbet	Sir John Ipstones (d.1394) of Blymhill	Elizabeth Corbet, heiress to Wattlesborough	John de la Pole of Dinas Mawddwy	Sir Thomas Erdington (c.1371–1434) of Erdington	Robert Corbet (1383–1420) of Moreton Corbet	Roger Corbet (died 1430) of Shrewsbury

== Political and military career ==
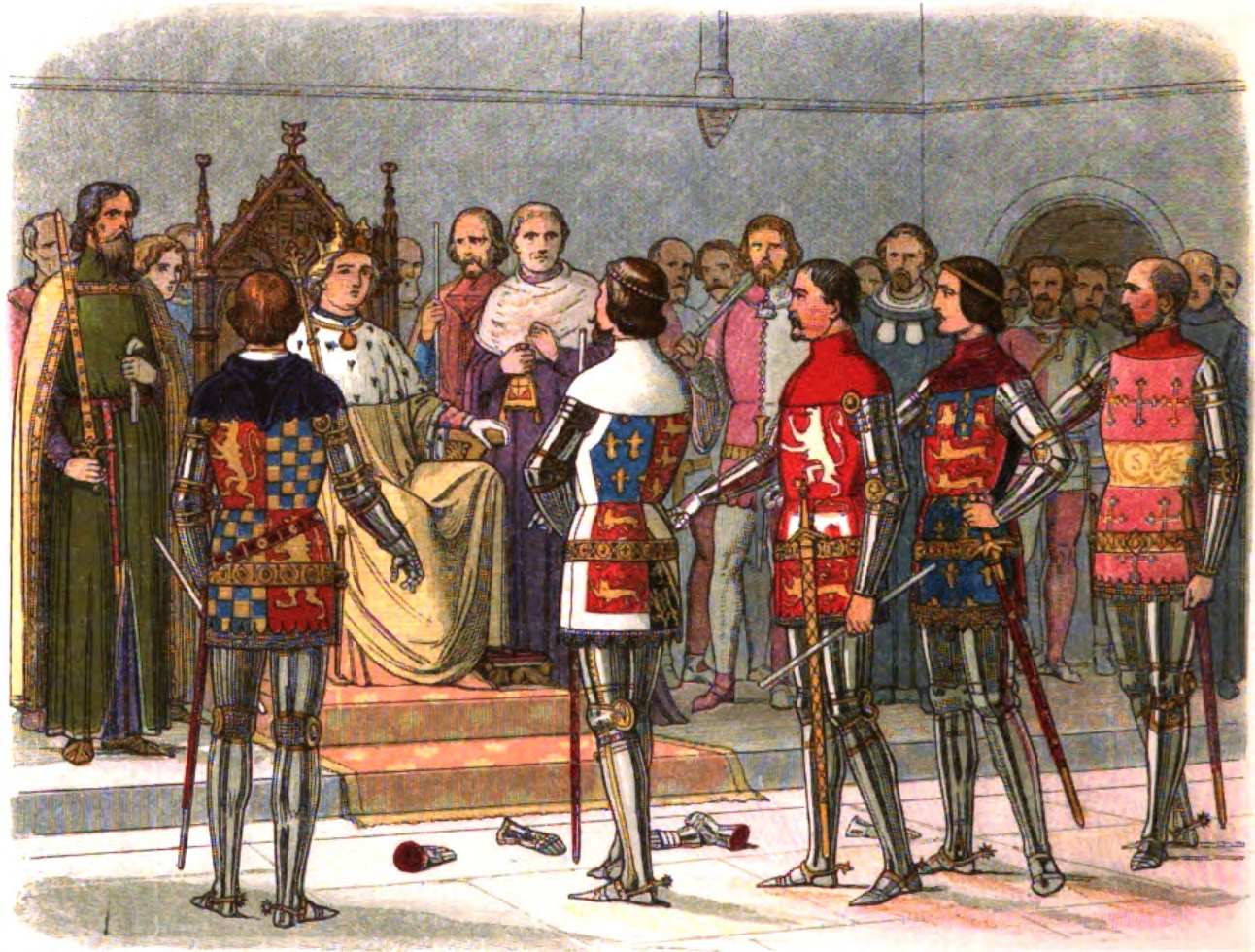
The Lords Appellant confront Richard II. In this Victorian illustration, Arundel is portrayed on the left, wearing his arms of a gold rampant lion on a red ground.

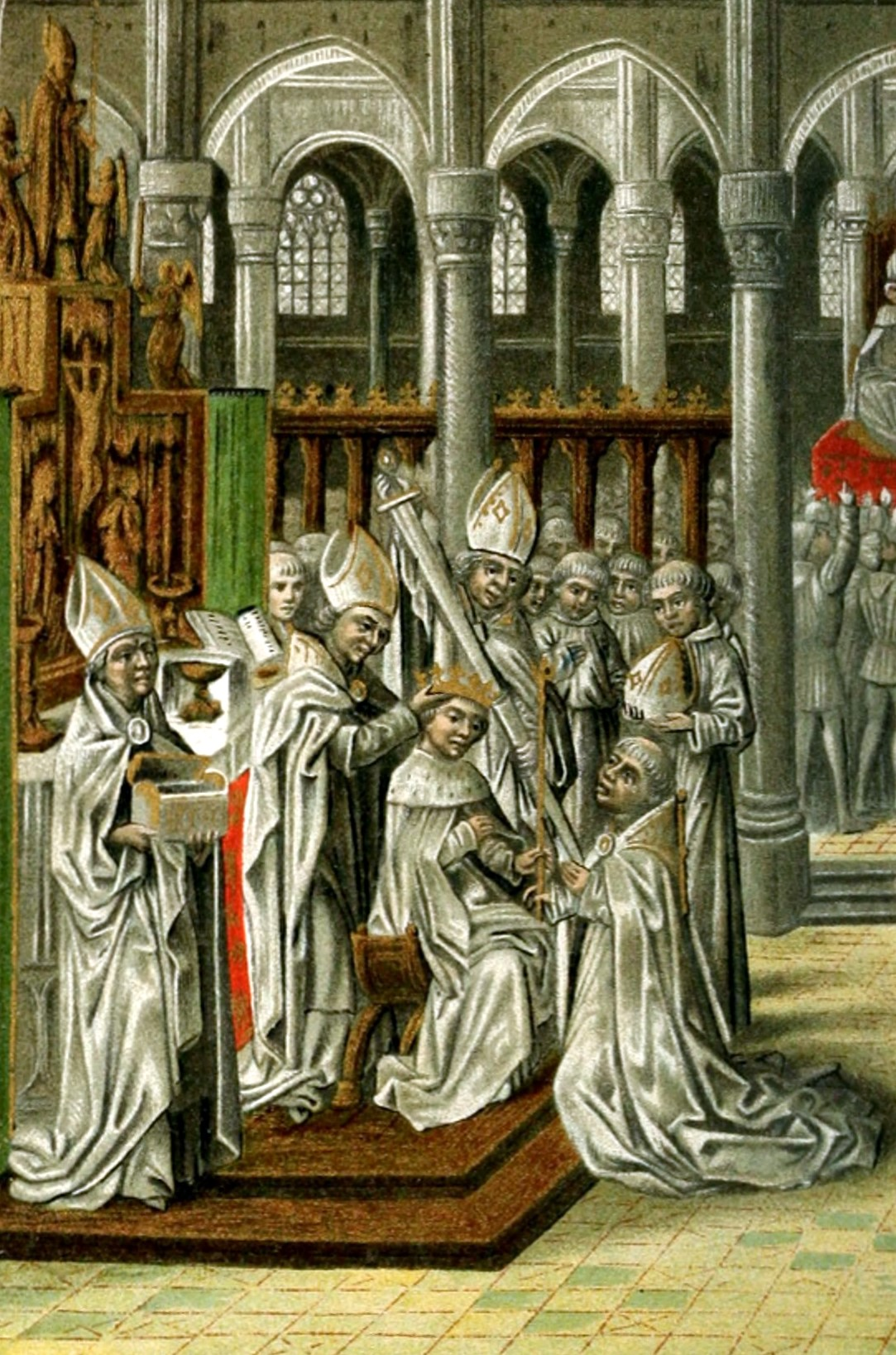
Coronation of Henry IV.

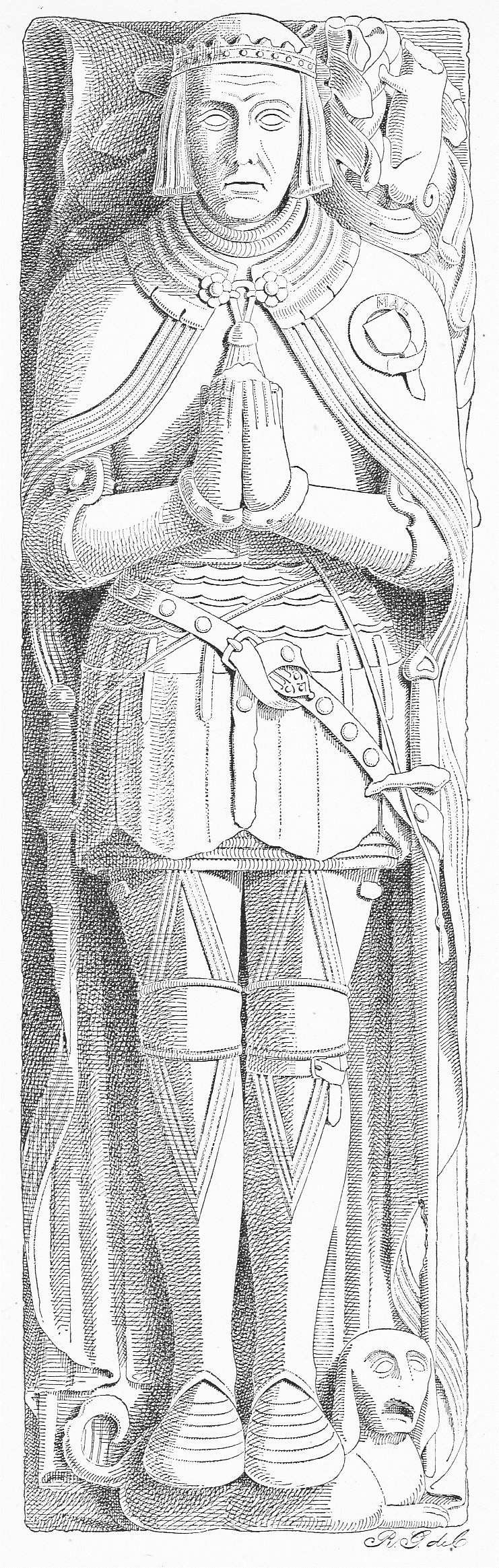
Effigy of John Talbot, later Earl of Shrewsbury, in St Alkmund's Church, Whitchurch. A distinguished campaigner in the Hundred Years' War, Talbot seems to have gained control of Darras's estates.

Darras formally enlisted as an esquire in the retinue of Richard FitzAlan, 11th Earl of Arundel in 1387. Among others to do so, and probably thereby form a political and personal bond with Arundel, was Thomas Whitton, a long-term associate of Darras. At this point Arundel was one of the Lords Appellant, a leader of the opposition to Richard II's favourites and his policy of peace with France. Darras served with him in a naval campaign against the French, which culminated in a significant victory off Margate. As a client of the earl, and in association with two other members of his affinity, John Burley and Fulk Sprenghose, Darras was made trustee of estates belonging to Richard, 4th Lord Talbot, who was married to Arundel's niece, Ankaret le Strange of Blackmere. In 1393 he represented his county in the parliament that began on 20 January and lasted about three weeks. His fellow MP was Sir William Hugford, who was closely associated with John le Strange, 6th Baron Strange of Knockin: although powerful, the 11th Earl of Arundel seems to have been much happier to share influence than was to prove the case with his son.

Arundel was executed in Richard II's purge of 1397. The inquisition into the earl's Shropshire lands listed the numerous small grants of land he had made to his affinity and others whom he needed to cultivate. One of these was a small estate at Gretton, Shropshire, held by Darras and worth 40 shillings annually. It seems, however, that Darras also had good contacts in the Lancastrian affinity. Earlier in the year, together with Edward Whitton, Henry Wynnesbury, and Fulk Pembridge, Darras was involved in some transaction that required each to pay £200 to Sir Walter Blount, An important participant in John of Gaunt's military adventures abroad and his leading representative in the Midlands.

When John of Gaunt's son and dispossessed successor, Henry Bolingbroke arrived in England to challenge Richard in 1399, the Arundels rallied to the cause of the House of Lancaster, formerly their bitter enemies: the dead earl's son, Thomas FitzAlan, 12th Earl of Arundel, and brother, Thomas Arundel, the Archbishop of Canterbury, became mainstays of the government of Bolingbroke, who came to the throne as Henry IV. Darras seems to have good connections with both parts of the victorious coalition and from this point he contrived to remain in royal favour, albeit sometimes with difficulty. He was made keeper for life of Morfe and Shirlet, areas of Royal forest on either side of the Severn in Shropshire, by letters patent of 4 November 1399. After his loyal service against the Glyndŵr Rising in Wales, a major preoccupation of both Arundel and the king, further letters patent in February 1407, described Darras as the "king's esquire," and confirmed that the office was indeed a reward for his military service and permitted him to appoint a ranger as a deputy to act in his absences.

It was probably his connection with the FitzAlans that assured his appointment as High Sheriff of Shropshire for 1401-2. Before he took up the shrievalty, his friend Sir John Cornwall, a former sheriff and also a former retainer of John of Gaunt, was accused of cattle rustling at Wytheford (also rendered Withiford) in Shropshire. Cornwall counted as family, as he was a grandson of Fulk, 1st Baron Strange of Blackmere, and so a first cousin of Darras's wife. However, the case affected the king's interests, as the plaintiffs, who were demanding £100, alleged that their cattle had already been taken into the custody of the county escheator when Cornwall removed them. In April 1402 Darras was one of four local gentry who stood surety at Westminster for Cornwall that he would keep the peace, an act that potentially created a conflict of interest. However, the plaintiffs alleged that Darras went much further. When the case was moved to the Shrewsbury assizes by a writ of nisi prius it was claimed that Darras allowed Cornwall to select the jurors. The jury was dismissed and Darras was ordered to summon a new panel for the next assizes. Darras was also the returning officer when Cornwall was elected to Parliament. Cornwall was a man of considerable prestige, claiming descent from King John, but an unstable and dangerous associate, who was to attract constant accusations of violence and intimidation.

The 12th Earl exercised a much tighter grip on power in the region than his father, dominating parliamentary representation at every election. It was Darras's turn again in 1404, when he was sent to Parliament with John Burley, another lawyer who worked mainly for the Fitzalans and who had fought alongside Darras in the naval campaign of 1387. Burley had also held the wardship of Robert Corbet, the heir of Sir Roger and nephew of Joan.

Darras could not entirely escape penalty when in 1406 he and Roger Willey bought two properties held in capita without obtaining royal approval: a quarter carucate of land at Worfield and a moiety of the forestership of Morfe. However, a pardon was granted on 15 November for a mere 6s. 8d. Darras and Willey then resold both properties to Richard Parlour, a burgess of Bridgnorth, again without asking permission: Parlour was compelled to sue and pay for pardon in 1408, after Darras's death.

In 1407 Darras, together with Robert Corbet, Roger Corbet, nephews of Joan, and William Ryman of Sussex – all of Arundel's affinity – were among a group of Shropshire gentry who granted a burgage in Shrewsbury, known as Ireland Hall, to Shrewsbury Abbey for pious purposes. The licence to accept this gift, which cost the abbey the considerable sum of 10 marks, was granted on 20 July. The younger Corbets had enlisted with Arundel about two years previously and were to acquire sinister reputations for violence and lawlessness. They and their uncle probably granted Ireland Hall on behalf of Arundel. The abbot of Shrewsbury, Thomas Prestbury, was a client of Archbishop Arundel, the earl's uncle, and had been imprisoned in 1399 for preaching against the government of Richard II. Later in the year Darras attended the election of knights of the shire, witnessing the return of Cornwall and David Holbache, a prominent lawyer and a close associate of Arundel. This was Darras's last important public appearance.

== Death and aftermath ==
Darras hanged himself at Neenton, probably during March 1408. The evidence for the date is a commission from the king, issued on 30 March, to four Shropshire gentry to investigate possible concealment of the deceased's goods, which as a suicide, escheated to the Crown. A formal order for the escheator to take his estates into the hands of the king was issued on 24 May. His holdings would normally have reverted to their feudal overlords but the young Edmund Mortimer, 5th Earl of March was the centre of plots against Henry IV and much of his property was temporarily or permanently forfeit.

Considerable confusion and disputes seem to have followed Darras's unusual and untimely death. At Sidbury the advowson was contested. On 6 July, as a new rector was needed at Sidbury, Henry St George acted as patron, presenting William Walkebache. On 11 August, however, John Talbot, 6th Baron Furnivall, also acting as patron and described as lord of Sidbury, presented Walter Lawrence. Talbot, the young son of Richard, Lord Talbot, and Ankaret le Strange, was to emerge as Arundel's main political rival in the county, prepared to fight force with force. On 23 August Bishop Robert Mascall was issued with a writ prohibiting him from admitting anyone to Sidbury until the issue was decided. The following April the bishop himself presented William Whitehead. By August 1409 Whitehead had resigned and Talbot presented his nominee for a second time, apparently triumphant in the struggle to take over Darras's lands and rights. The same pattern is shown at Linley, which probably fell into his hands, as his widow, Margaret Beauchamp, Countess of Shrewsbury, held half the manor as a jointure property after his death.

Similar confusions arose over Darras's keepership of Morfe and Shirlet. Soon after Darras's death the king conferred the office on Sir John Cornwall, removing it from Nicholas Gerard, on the grounds that the office had not been vacant when Gerard acquired it, although the story behind the recital of facts is mysterious. There were several Shrewsbury business men named Nicholas Gerard in the 14th century and this seems to be the one served as MP in 1399 and bailiff in 1412. Cornwall soon proved himself tyrannical in office. By March 1410 the king was ordering Arundel and his legal team, John Burley, David Holbache and Thomas Young, together with Lord Furnival, to investigate breaches of customary manorial and grazing rights at Worfield in Morff Forest, made by Arundel's brother-in-law, William de Beauchamp, 1st Baron Bergavenny. Cornwall was clearly quite reckless in his depredations, as there had been similar complaints from William Ferrers, 5th Baron Ferrers of Groby. Joan Beauchamp, Arundel's sister continued to complain about Cornwall into 1412, after she was widowed, prompting a further commission of inquiry by the same team. The following year the king received similar complaints from John Marshall, Dean of the royal free chapel at Bridgnorth It seems that, before sending in Arundel's lawyers to investigate, the king secured Cornwall's resignation and on 13 February 1413 installed Roger Willey, Darras's old business partner, as keeper in his place.

== See also ==
- Bastard feudalism
- Corbet family

== Footnotes ==
Parliament of England
Preceded by Sir Hugh Cheyne; Sir Roger Corbet	Member of Parliament for Shropshire; 1393; With: Sir William Hugford	Succeeded by Sir Adam Peshale; Sir William Hugford
Preceded by John Burley; George Hawkestone	Member of Parliament for Shropshire; October 1404; With: John Burley	Succeeded by David Holbache; Thomas Whitton
