= Roger Corbet (died 1430) =

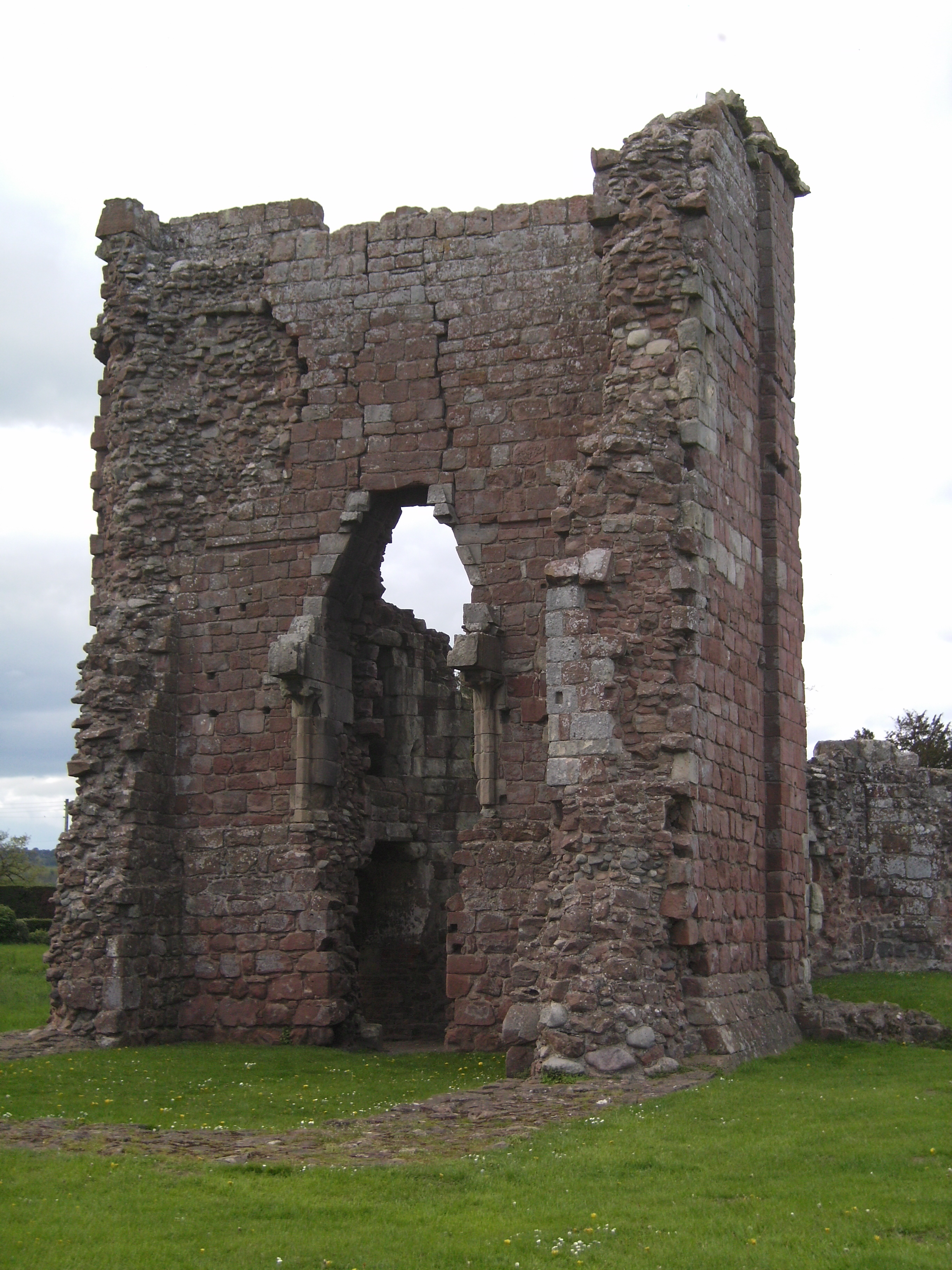
Part of the medieval keep at Moreton Corbet. The castle was still a serious fortification for a dynasty of Marcher Lords when it was Roger Corbet's childhood home.

Roger Corbet (died 1430) was an English soldier, politician and landowner. He was a client of Thomas FitzAlan, 12th Earl of Arundel and was implicated in the disorder that accompanied Arundel's rule in Shropshire. He probably fought at the Battle of Agincourt. After the death of his patron, he became a successful municipal politician at Shrewsbury and represented Shrewsbury twice and Shropshire once in the House of Commons of England.

== Background and early life ==
Roger Corbet was the younger brother of Robert Corbet (1383–1420) and was frequently associated with him. However, Roger's very existence is omitted by several sources. He does not figure in the Corbet family pedigrees in the heraldic visitations of Shropshire Augusta Corbet, the family historian, also gives a pedigree of the Corbets of Moreton Corbet which omits him. She quotes extensive complaints to the 1415 parliament, in the original Anglo-Norman language, in which numerous misdeeds are listed, but insists that they refer to Robert's younger son of the same name, who was probably unborn, at most an infant, at that time. It is with his this nephew that he is generally confused.

Roger therefore had the same background as Robert, his brother. His parents were:

- Sir Roger Corbet of Moreton Corbet. The Corbet family had been important in the Welsh Marches since the Norman Conquest. The Moreton Corbet branch of the family had become the most important in Shropshire after the Corbet line at Caus Castle was replaced in 1347 by Ralph de Stafford, 1st Earl of Stafford, A struggle by the Moreton Corbet branch to prevent property being dispersed through female heirs had greatly preoccupied Sir Roger.
- Margaret Erdington, daughter of Sir Giles Erdington of Erdington, Warwickshire. The Erdington's became even more involved in the Corbets' bitter property disputes because Sir Roger's sister, Margaret Corbet, married his brother-in-law, Sir Thomas Erdington.

The younger Roger Corbet's birth date is unknown but must have been after 1383, as he was definitely younger than his brother, who was born in December of that year. The heraldic visitation lists two sisters, Johanna or Joan and Elianora or Eleanor. Their parents died within a few months of each other in 1395. The eldest son, Robert, was not yet 12 and entered a period of wardship – granted to Thomas Percy, 1st Earl of Worcester. by Richard II but transferred under Henry IV to John Burley, a retainer of Thomas FitzAlan, 12th Earl of Arundel. Both Robert and Roger were to develop an increasingly close relationship with Arundel, whose family were key supporters of the House of Lancaster.

== Political and military career ==
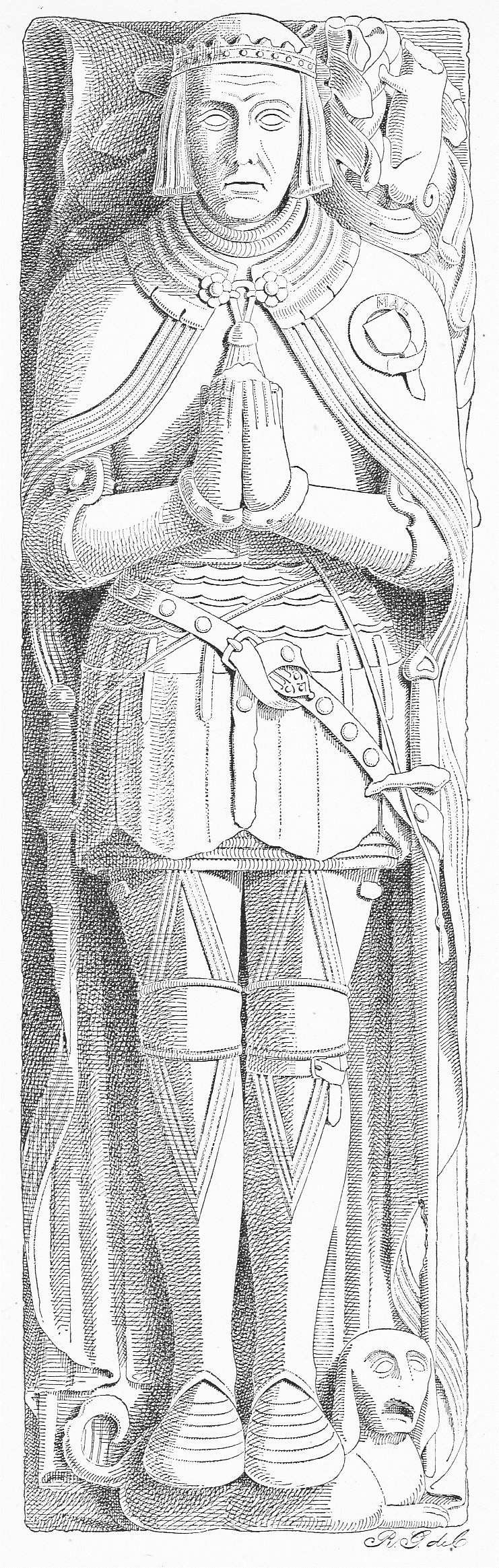
John Talbot, later Earl of Shrewsbury and a hero of the Hundred Years' War. He was distantly related to the Corbets but a bitter enemy of Arundel, their patron. He won the battle for hegemony in the region with Arundel's death.

=== The Arundel affinity ===
Roger and Robert Corbet together enlisted in Arundel's affinity around 1405, coming to be known as esquiers de count d'Arundell. Arundel had lost his father, Richard FitzAlan, 11th Earl of Arundel in Richard II's purge of the Lords Appellant in 1397 and this had welded himself and his uncle, Thomas Arundel, the Archbishop of Canterbury, to the Henry IV's new regime, giving him great power and influence nationally as well as regionally.

In 1407 Roger was one of four of Arundel's entourage who granted a house in Shrewsbury, known as Ireland Hall, to Shrewsbury Abbey: the other three were his brother Robert, their aunt Joan's husband, John Darras, and William Ryman of Sussex . The transaction was probably on Arundel's behalf. However, Roger was at this stage still on good terms with John Talbot, Lord Furnival, the future Earl of Shrewsbury, with whom the Corbet brothers had family connections through their paternal grandmother, Elizabeth, daughter of Fulk, 1st Baron Strange of Blackmere. In 1410 he acted as feoffee to help Talbot settle Worksop Manor on his wife. Corbet attended the election of knights of the shire at Shrewsbury Castle in 1410 and 1413. Arundel's group was increasingly dominant in county elections and Robert Corbet was one of those sent to Parliament in 1413.

=== Great mayhem ===
The accession of a new monarch, Henry V, released a chorus of complaints against Arundel's high-handedness, orchestrated by Talbot, who saw an opportunity to widen his own influence in the region. In 1414 numerous petitions to the Fire and Faggot Parliament, which was held in Leicester in April, raised grave concerns about lawlessness in Shropshire and the Marches. Corbet himself was accused of breaking the livery laws. He was also accused of raiding the home of the rector of Edgmond, Shropshire in 1412 with an armed force, stripping the house of his property and driving off his livestock. Robert had got into a dispute with the tax collectors sent to levy the tenths and fifteenths agreed by the 1413 parliament and Roger was accused of setting his servants on them....

des qeux mesprisions ils bailleront a mesme notre Sieureign le Roi une bille a sa darrien esteance a Dunstaple, la vient I'avant dit Roger Corbet ovec cynk persones et ovec force et armes sodaynement sur I'avant dit Roger Leyney apres son venue al Hostieir en faisant sa Collecte luy arsonant es tielz paroles Who made the so hardy to putte any bille to the Kyng to undo me with all?

That is: when one of them, a man called Roger Leyney, obtained a writ against him, Roger pursued him to Dunstable with armed party of five, and suddenly confronted the man at his hostel, yelling "who made thee so hardy to put any bill to the King to undo me withall?" – the single English phrase standing out starkly in an otherwise Anglo-Norman document and signifying the sense of impunity that had hitherto accompanied the rule of the Arundel affinity. Despite Leyney's attempts to come to an accommodation, Roger had set about him,

bata, naufra, et ses chambes coupa, luy endonant pluseurs autres horribles ployes a son final anientisement et grauntz maheime

Corbet had beaten and wounded the man, hacking at his legs and causing horrible sufferings, maiming him seriously.

These complaints of "great mayhem" prompted the king himself to preside over the Court of King's Bench at Shrewsbury in Trinity term – the last tour made by the court before it became permanently fixed in Westminster. However, the cases against Arundel's esquiers were so numerous and the facts so contested that the cases were remanded to the Michaelmas term session of the King's Bench at Westminster. However, Arundel provided bail and sureties, and the accused were able to present royal pardons to the court when summoned. The charges were revived and supplemented in 1415 but there is no evidence that any of the accused were ever punished.

=== The Agincourt campaign ===
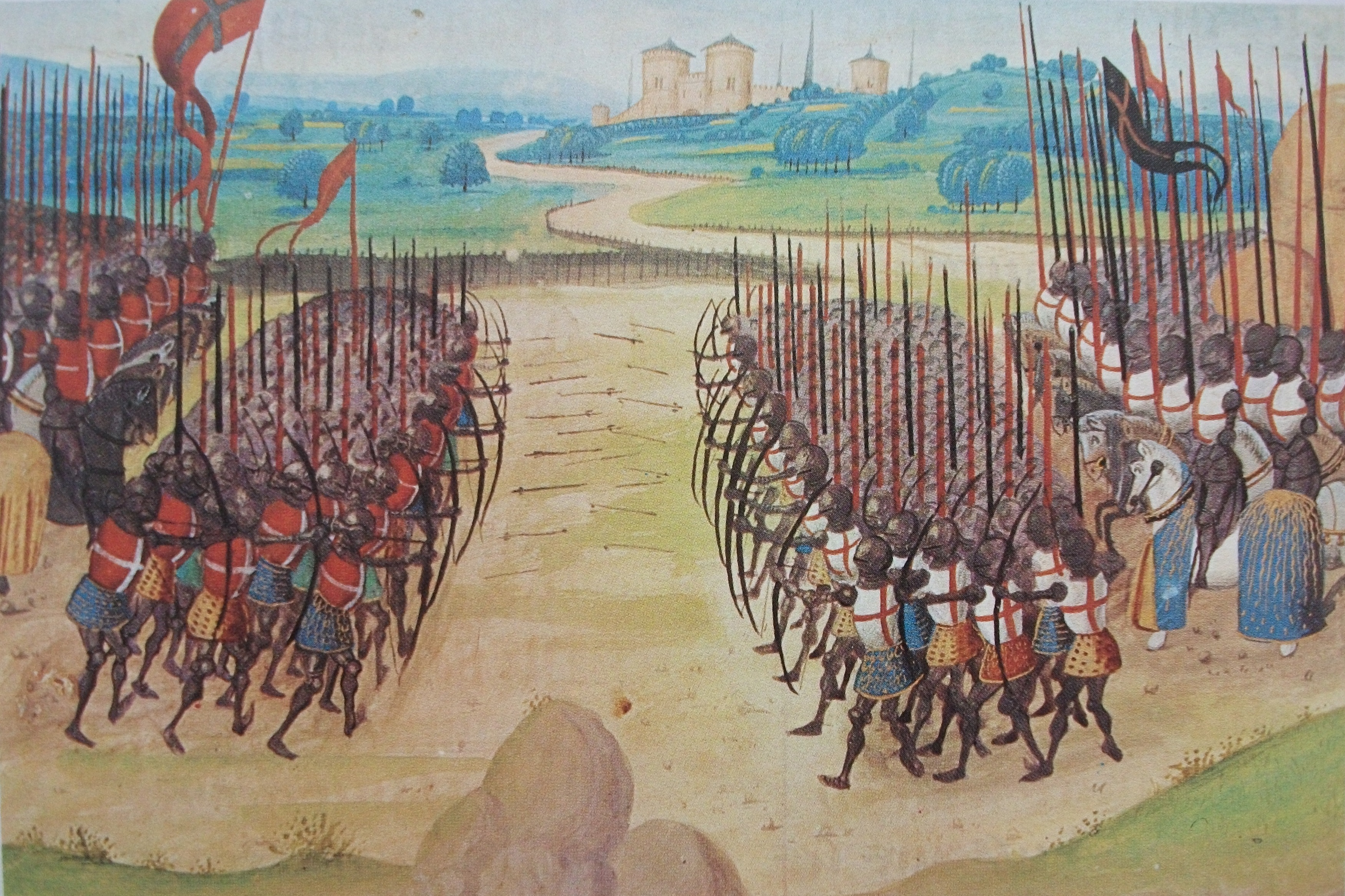
Roger Corbet probably fought in the Battle of Agincourt, pictured here in a 15th-century miniature.

The Corbet brothers followed Arundel to Normandy in August 1415 as part of the king's pursuit of his claim to the French throne. However, the earl contracted dysentery at the Siege of Harfleur only a month after the start of the campaign and was invalided home to Sussex, followed by Robert Corbet. The earl died at Arundel Castle on 13 October, leaving the Corbets without a protector. Roger seems to have remained in France and there is no evidence that he left before the Battle of Agincourt, so he very well could have been a participant.

=== Municipal politics ===
Now unprotected from Talbot's dominance in Shropshire, except by distant family connections, Corbet sidestepped county politics and made a new career for himself in the affairs of the county town of Shrewsbury. The Corbets had a number of properties in the town, at least some of which had been passed on to Roger, who could thus plausibly be claimed as a burgess. This was essential if he were to hold borough offices. Since its incorporation by king John in 1199, the town had been ruled by a duumvirate, elected annually and subsequently called bailiffs, assisted by a common council. The constitution of the town had been reformed in the 1380s under the auspices of the 11th Earl of Arundel, who claimed to be its "hereditary protector," and the council fixed at 12 members. Corbet was elected as bailiff on Saint Giles ' Day, 1 September 1416, together with John Perle, an experienced municipal politician with a similarly turbulent past to his own – except that Perle had carried out his depredations against the Arundels. Corbet and Perle carried through a reform of tax collection in the borough shortly after their election. The constitution of the borough envisaged only one term for bailiffs, with a three-year disqualification from civic office following. However, both Corbet and Perle were re-elected for the 1417–18 term, along with the executive committee of six assessors. Following this, the constitution was again breached when Corbet and Perle were elected coroners for 1418–19.

=== Profit under the Crown ===
Corbet now began to acquire valuable positions in the patronage of the Crown. He was made a commissioner at the inquiry in Shrewsbury into the estates of the Barons FitzWarin of Whittington Castle, long troubled by short-lived heirs and a tortuous succession. He was also made escheator of Shropshire and the March, a post with potential for considerable profit. In 1420 he was made Constable of Holt Castle, an important royal border fortress. In 1422 he was entrusted with the custody of 15 French prisoners of war.

=== Member of Parliament ===
Corbet was elected to Parliament for the first time by the borough of Shrewsbury in 1419, when his brother Robert represented Shropshire. It was common for the town to return either current or recently retired bailiffs. His colleague was David Rathbone. Parliament sat for 28 days from 16 October until 13 November. Their expenses differed considerably, Rathbone asking for £4, while Corbet claimed only £2 16s. 8d. It is not known whether Corbet missed some of the sessions or whether he was simply more modest in his demands: the council treated him to win on his return.

Corbet represented Shrewsbury again in 1425. In 1429 he was knight of the shire, alongside William Burley, who was to represent the county a total of 19 times and twice serve as Speaker.

== Marriage and family ==
Connected with Corbet's new-found respectability in his later years was a marriage to an heiress of wealthy family. His wife, Elizabeth, was the daughter of Sir William Lichfield of Eastham, Worcestershire, and Elizabeth Cornwall.

Sir William was an MP for Worcestershire and twice High Sheriff of Shropshire. Although he held substantial lands in both counties, the Lichfields were from the cathedral town of Lichfield in Staffordshire. Through inheritance from his relatives, Sir William acquired a considerable amount of property in Staffordshire, including land at Freeford and the estate of Abnalls, near Burntwood. However, the origins of the Lichfields were fairly humble and their surname was also given as Taverner, after the occupation of an ancestor: William the taverner, also known as William of Lichfield, was bailiff of Lichfield in 1308 and later twice represented the Borough of Lichfield in Parliament. The family also used the name Swinfen, from a village of that name near Lichfield. Sir William had a number of relatives who sometimes used these names and served in Parliament They included his uncle Aymer Lichfield alias Swinfen, who twice represented Staffordshire, and his cousin Roger Lichfield alias Swinfen, a Worcester MP. Through both of these he inherited property, although in Aymer's case a good deal of debt too.

Corbet's mother-in-law was descended, through an illegitimate son of Richard, 1st Earl of Cornwall, and King of the Romans, from King John. Her father, Sir John Cornwall, was twice a Shropshire MP and a close associate of John Darras, the husband of Corbet's aunt, and of John Burley, who held Robert Corbet's wardship. He died in 1414, while awaiting trial for murder, and his daughter Elizabeth was his sole heiress. This meant that Corbet's wife could look forward to inheriting the properties of two wealthy parents. However, an early death meant Roger Corbet never enjoyed this wealth and was not to initiate a new and wealthy branch of the Corbet family, as he and Elizabeth Lichfield had only one daughter, Margaret.

== Last years and death ==
Corbet was troubled by legal proceedings only once in his later years: in 1425, when the Earl of Stafford alleged he had abducted one of his wards. He attended Parliament in that year with his father-in-law.

Corbet died on 15 July 1430. His daughter, Margaret, was only three years old and became a ward of John Wood, a Worcestershire lawyer. She married Humphrey Stafford of Frome – actually Bishop's Frome in Herefordshire. Sir William Lichfield long outlived Corbet and Margaret did not inherit his estates until 1446. However, within 20 years, complex property disputes arose over Eastham and other estates, with the Ferrers family challenging ownership. The dispute and its ramifications rumbled on, with the Ferrers family apparently holding sway in the 1470s but Humphrey Stafford vindicating his rights later, until 1485, when Walter Devereux, 8th Baron Ferrers of Chartley was killed at the Battle of Bosworth and his lands confiscated. This led to further problems, as the Crown and its agents looked again into the Ferrers claims, and in a subsequent contest there was armed conflict between Stafford's heir, Margaret Vere, and the Cornwall family.

== Footnotes ==
Parliament of England
| Preceded by David Holbache | Member of Parliament for Shropshire; 1419; With: David Rathbone | Succeeded by Robert Whitcombe; Richard Bentley |
