= Robert Corbet (died 1420) =

English soldier, politician and landowner

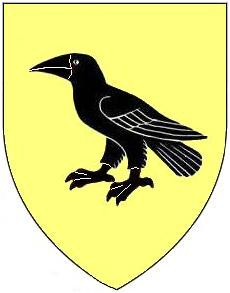
Arms of the Corbet baronets of Moreton Corbet, based on the arms of the medieval Corbets. The raven was used by most branches of the Corbet family, whose name means "little crow."

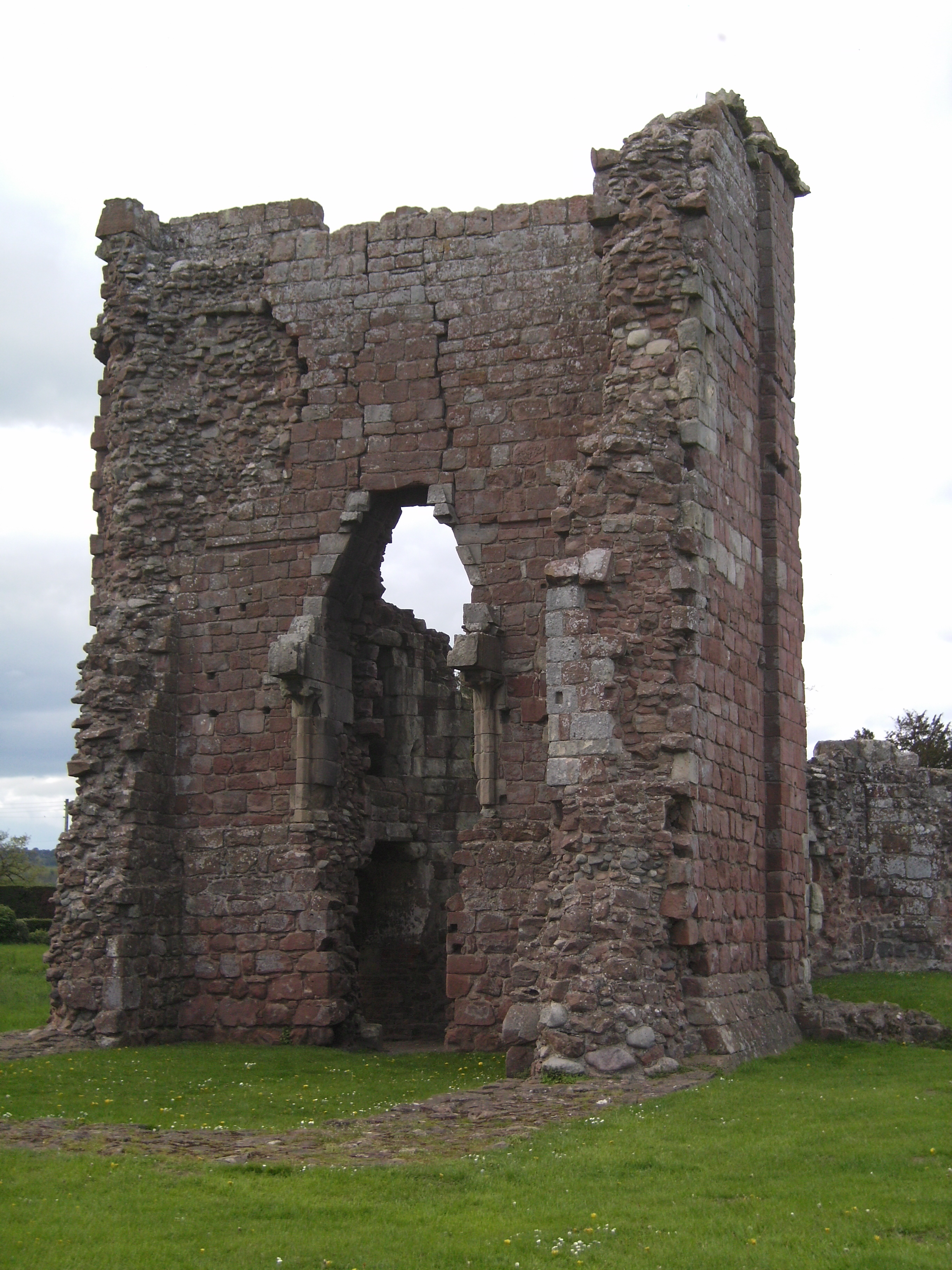
Part of the medieval keep at Moreton Corbet. The castle was a serious fortification for a dynasty of Marcher Lords but was turned into a more comfortable family home by Sir Andrew Corbet in the 16th century.

Robert Corbet (1383–1420) of Moreton Corbet, Shropshire, was an English soldier, politician and landowner who represented Shropshire twice in the House of Commons of England. A retainer of Thomas FitzAlan, 12th Earl of Arundel, and implicated in his alleged misrule in Shropshire, he accompanied his patron to the Siege of Harfleur and suffered a temporary eclipse after his death.

== Background and early life ==
Robert Corbet was the eldest son of:

- Sir Roger Corbet of Moreton Corbet. The Corbet family had been important in the Welsh Marches since the Norman Conquest. With the extinction of the Corbet line at Caus Castle in 1347, its properties had passed to Ralph de Stafford, 1st Earl of Stafford, leaving the cadet branch, at Moreton Corbet Castle, the leading branch of the family in Shropshire. As a third son, Sir Roger had been compelled to fight a series of legal actions to prevent his family property slipping away.
- Margaret Erdington, daughter of Sir Giles Erdington of Erdington, Warwickshire. The marriage of Roger Corbet and Margaret Erdington was one part of a double link between the families, as Margaret Corbet and Sir Thomas Erdington, their siblings, also married. The Erdingtons also became embroiled in the Corbets' property disputes.

Robert Corbet was born on 8 December 1383 at Moreton Corbet. His father and mother died within a few months of each other, still fairly young, in 1395. Robert was not yet 12 – well below the age of majority. The most powerful magnate in the county was Richard FitzAlan, 11th Earl of Arundel and he would normally have had a strong claim to Corbet's wardship. However, Arundel was one of the Lords Appellant, who had opposed Richard II's policies and favourites. As Corbet's wardship became available, the king was moving against Arundel and his allies, and he was arrested on 12 July 1397, to face attainder and execution on 21 September. In October 1397 Corbet's marriage and wardship were granted to Thomas Percy, 1st Earl of Worcester. Although he had been ennobled by Richard II, Percy was one of those nobles who helped depose him in 1399, installing as king Henry IV. However, Henry was particularly dependent on support from the Arundels, particularly the executed earl's brother, Thomas Arundel, the Archbishop of Canterbury, and his son, Thomas FitzAlan, 12th Earl of Arundel. Thus he compelled Worcester to cede the wardship of Corbet to John Burley, a Shropshire MP and a retainer of the young earl. The growing alienation of Worcester from the king came to a head in 1403, when he was publicly executed after the Battle of Shrewsbury. Corbet, meanwhile, was on the winning side, as part of the Arundel faction, although there is no evidence that he fought in the battle.

== Landowner ==
Corbet was able to prove his majority and take control of the family estates in 1405. At about the same time, he was able to pledge his allegiance to Henry IV personally at Stafford.

An inquisition of 1406, presumably related to Corbet's taking livery of his estates, lists some of the properties that had been in his mother's hands at her death.

Shawbury Manor, Moreton Corbet Manor, Chatewyn Manor, Upton Waters Manor, Tireleye Manor, Messuages and lands in Ivelith near Shiffenhale Lauleye (Lawley) Manor, as of the Manor of Hynstok, Blecheleye Vill, Stoke Manor, Culsey Manor, as of the Manor of Tirleye, Bouleye super Hyneheth (Booley upon Hine Heath) Vill, Ronton Vill, Ambaston Vill, six messuages in Withiford Co Salop and the Marches of Wales.

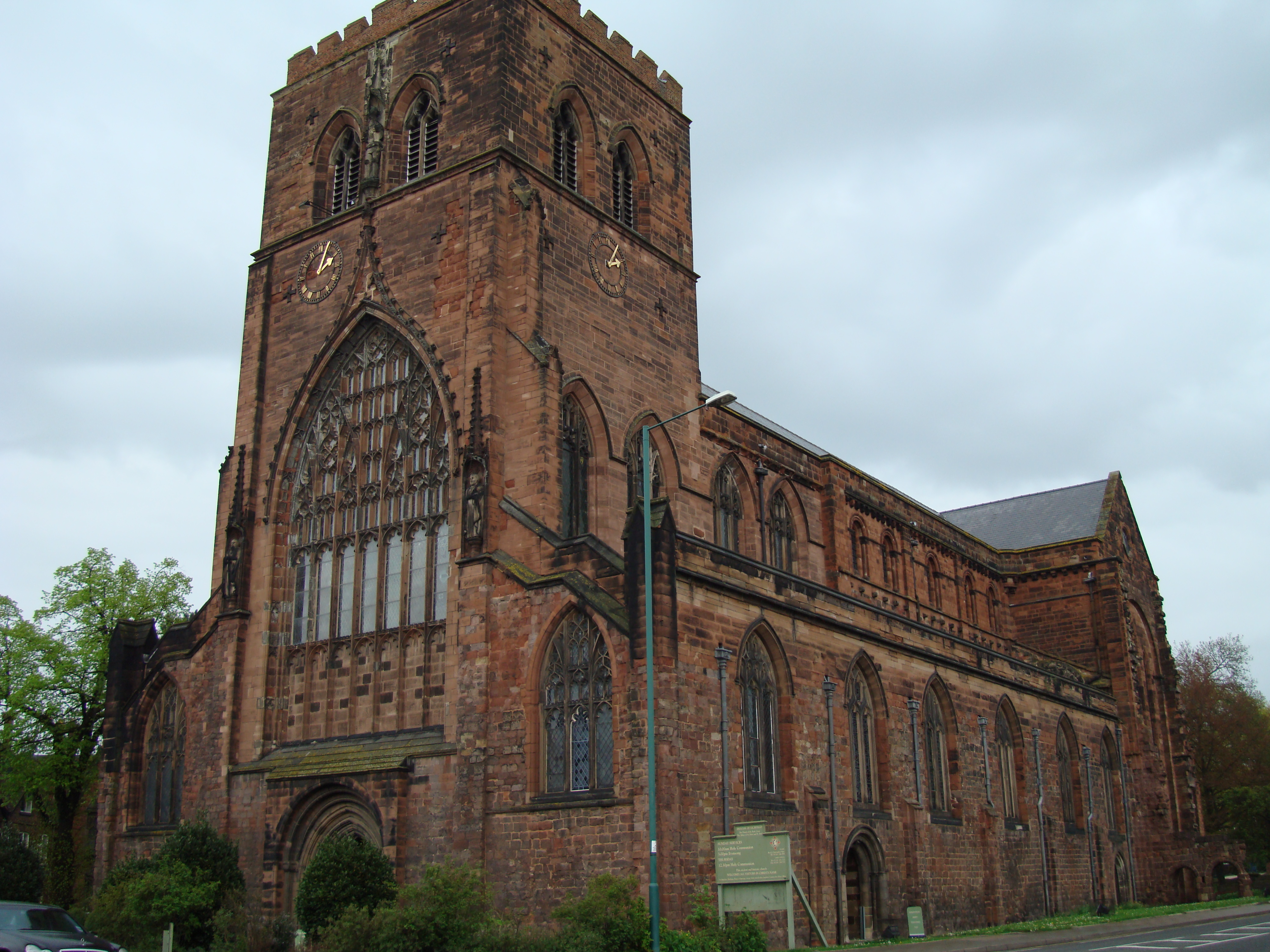
Shrewsbury Abbey today. Only part of the great medieval monastery survives as Holy Cross parish church.

Corbet's property transactions took place generally within Arundel's retinue. In 1407 he and his younger brother, Roger, John Darras, their aunt Joan's husband, and William Ryman of Sussex – all Arundel allies – obtained a licence from the king to grant a burgage called Ireland Hall in Shrewsbury to Shrewsbury Abbey. The grant was to support works of piety and was probably on Arundel's behalf. In 1413 Corbet enlisted the help of William Burley, John Burley's son and a future Speaker, to entail the manor of Shawbury. He obtained royal permission to enfeoff Burley and a group of associates with the estate, entailing it on himself, his wife, Margaret, and their descendants. In September 1419 he acquired a considerable number of estates in Shropshire from Roger Thornes of Shelvock Manor. Thornes was a notable lawyer who had served as borough attorney for Shrewsbury. For reasons which remain mysterious, he disposed of his ancestral estates as soon as he had fully inherited them, apparently settling for those he had acquired by his own efforts and through inheritance by his wife, Cecily Young.

== Political and military career ==
Robert Corbet and his younger brother, Roger, enlisted in the service of the Earl of Arundel in 1405. For a decade, most of their public and political interventions closely followed the policies and interests of the Earl.

Corbet was made a Justice of the Peace for Shropshire in 1410. In the same year he attended the election of Arundel's supporters, David Holbache and John Burley as knights of the shire at Shrewsbury Castle. In March 1413, after Henry V succeeded to the throne and Arundel had been promoted to Lord Treasurer he was himself elected to Parliament for the first time. The other member was Richard Lacon, who was married to Corbet's cousin, and had profited materially from his closeness to Arundel and the House of Lancaster. This marked the zenith of Arundel's dominance in Shropshire, which largely excluded representation of other magnates. The MPs for Shrewsbury were Holbache and Urian St. Pierre, and these joined with Corbet and Lacon to act as mainpernors in Chancery for Matthew ap Meredith, guaranteeing his good conduct, while the parliament was still in session.

The triumph of Arundel was soon followed by a furious reaction, led by John Talbot, Lord Furnival, the future Earl of Shrewsbury. Talbot's resentment became so threatening that he was sent to the Tower of London for a time in November and both he and Arundel were made to put up large guarantees of good conduct. Corbet was not a member of the next parliament, the Fire and Faggot Parliament, which was held in Leicester. However, he featured prominently in many of the complaints made there against Arundel's rule in Shropshire. It was alleged that taxes approved by the May 1413 parliament could not be collected in the county because he and Lacon had fallen out with the tax collectors they had themselves recommended. The collectors had been attacked with swords at Moreton Corbet by servants of Robert and Roger Corbet. When they stayed at Oldbury, just south of Bridgnorth, an armed force of 120 came down from the town after them. They had lost employees and horses, and barely escaped with their own lives.

In response to the complaints, the king himself presided over the Court of King's Bench at Shrewsbury in Trinity term, the summer session. Arundel's men faced a litany of charges, the most serious being that they had organised a raid on Much Wenlock on 18 May 1413, employing an armed force of 2,000 from Cheshire. The prior of Wenlock Priory complained that these were armed Welshmen, who had destroyed a mill: he could obtain no redress from Arundel. All of the accused were charged with breaking the law on livery. The cases were not decided at that point but transferred to the Michaelmas term session of the King's Bench at Westminster. Corbet had the reasonable excuse that he was actually at Parliament when the worst offences occurred. The accused argued that they were simply intervening in Wenlock as justices of the Peace, enforcing the law against malefactors, including Talbot. Arundel put up bail and sureties, and used his influence to obtain pardons for his retainers.

In August 1415, Corbet accompanied Arundel to Normandy as part of the king's resumption of the Hundred Years' War. Arundel fell ill at the Siege of Harfleur and was allowed to return to England. On 4 October Corbet was also allowed to return. However, Arundel died on 13 October, leaving Corbet unprotected in his disputes. At the 1415 parliament he was accused of another catalogue of assaults on tax collectors, general commotions and threats against complainants, in association with his brother, but the matter seems to have gone no further. However, he was removed from the Shropshire bench in 1416. He was still under a cloud early in 1419, when he was ordered to appear before the king's council, if required, under threat of a £100 fine. However, he was never summoned.

Corbet seems to have crept back into favour, although the precise reasons are unknown; possibly his offences were fading from memory. He was elected to the Commons again later in 1419. He was second to William Burley, who had established good connections with Talbot, while continuing to serve the Arundel estate. It is possible Corbet had done the same: he had a family relationship with Talbot through the Barons Strange of Blackmere. He was then pricked High Sheriff of Shropshire, a considerable honour in the royal gift, and signifying full rehabilitation. However, he died during his shrievalty.

== Death ==
The family historian, Augusta Corbet, writing towards the end of World War I, considered that Corbet survived until 1438–40, with his son and heir, Thomas, predeceasing him. This accords quite well with the date given in the heraldic visitation: 17 Henry VI. However, more recent accounts place his death on 12 August 1420. The difference is related to a problem in identifying Corbet's wife and her history.

== Marriage and family ==
The earlier sources identify Corbet's wife as Margaret Mallory, daughter of William Mallory, whom Corbet associates with a landowner prominent in Rutland and Cambridgeshire. It now seems that Corbet's identification of William was correct, but he was actually Margaret's second husband. Hence, she became Margaret Mallory only on remarriage, after Corbet's death. Her original name is not given.

Robert and Margaret Corbet had two sons, Thomas and Roger, both later MPs for Shropshire. Thomas, the elder son, died without issue and the Corbet line at Moreton was continued by Roger. Corbet also mentions three daughters: Elizabeth, Dorothea and Mary.

Margaret married Sir William Mallory of Papworth St. Agnes (a parish that lay mainly in Cambridgeshire, although the Mallory family resided in the small portion of it then within Huntingdonshire) and had by him a further son called Thomas. Mallory has been an elusive figure, partly because he shares his name with a contemporary who was knight of the shire for Leicestershire in 1419. Their son is a still more curious figure, qualified by his name, at least, as a candidate for identification with the poet Thomas Malory, author of Le Morte d'Arthur. A letter from A.T. Martin making just such an identification appeared in the Athenaeum in September 1897 and was taken seriously for some time by editors of Malory, including the very scholarly Alfred W. Pollard.

== Footnotes ==
Parliament of England
Preceded by Not known – records lost	Member of Parliament for Shropshire; 1413 (May); With: Richard Lacon	Succeeded by David Holbache; John Wele
Preceded by William Burley; Richard Fox	Member of Parliament for Shropshire; 1419; With: William Burley	Succeeded by William Burley
