= Thonock =

Small settlement in the West Lindsey district of Lincolnshire, England

Coordinates: 53.423497°N 0.759740°W

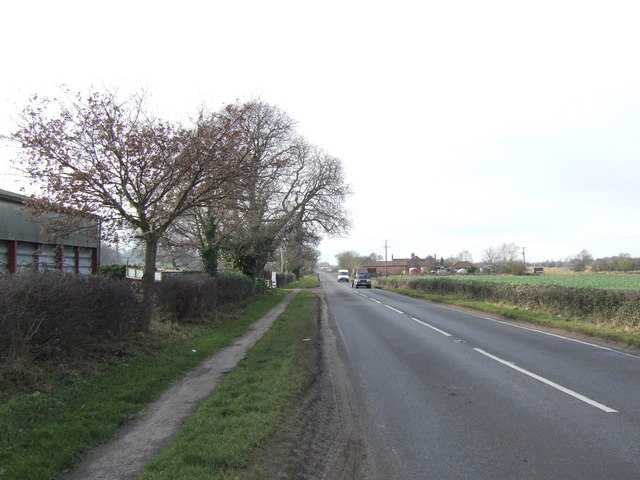
- Thonock Road

- Location within Lincolnshire
- OS grid reference: SK825925
  - London: 140 mi (230 km) S
- Civil parish: Gainsborough
- District: West Lindsey
- Shire county: Lincolnshire
- Region: East Midlands
- Country: England
- Sovereign state: United Kingdom
- Post town: Gainsborough
- Postcode district: DN21
- Police: Lincolnshire
- Fire: Lincolnshire
- Ambulance: East Midlands
- UK Parliament: Gainsborough

Thonock is a small settlement in the West Lindsey district of Lincolnshire, England. It is situated approximately 2 miles (3 km) north from the town of Gainsborough, and on the A159 road The population is included in the civil parish of Blyton.

Thonock existed as a small village at the time of Domesday Book of 1086, when it consisted of five households.

Thonock is listed as a deserted medieval village, but there are no visible earthworks. It existed as a part of Gainsborough in the early 14th century, and as a small settlement, including the hamlet of Havercroft, in later centuries, when High and Low (Nether) Thonock were mentioned. Havercroft lost settlement is located at OS Grid Reference SK 82799 93194 in the present parish of Morton. There are no earthworks however aerial photography clearly shows the boundaries of the village bisected by the Gainsborough to Grimsby railway line.

Thonock civil parish was created from part of Gainsborough parish in 1894, but was later dissolved in 1974.

A golf club is based at Thonock Park.
