= Neenton =

Coordinates: 52.486°N 2.535°W

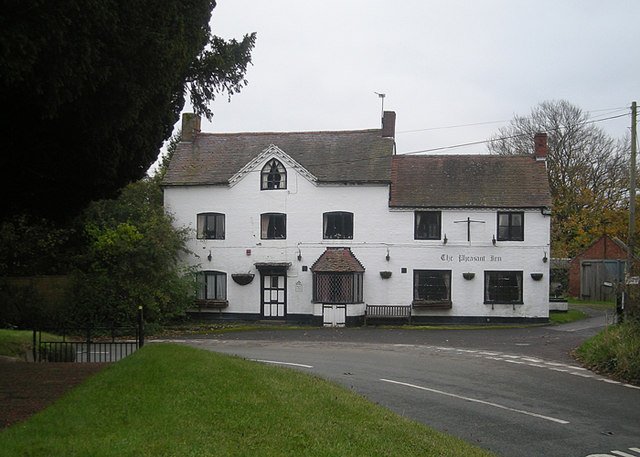
- The Pheasant Inn, Neenton, Shropshire

- Location within Shropshire
- Population: 233 (2011)
- OS grid reference: SO636877
- Civil parish: Neenton
- Unitary authority: Shropshire
- Ceremonial county: Shropshire
- Region: West Midlands
- Country: England
- Sovereign state: United Kingdom
- Post town: BRIDGNORTH
- Postcode district: WV16
- Dialling code: 01746
- Police: West Mercia
- Fire: Shropshire
- Ambulance: West Midlands
- UK Parliament: Ludlow

Neenton is a civil parish and small village in south east Shropshire, England, which is situated on the B4364 southwest of the market town of Bridgnorth. The Rea Brook/River Rea, which was historically known as the River Neen, flows by the village. There is a church on the corner of the B4364 passing through Neenton called the All Saints Church, also there is a public house open, called the Pheasant Inn (previously "The New Inn").

== History ==
Data from the 1801 Census shows that Neenton's population was very small with 120 persons, this population fluctuated insignificantly for the next 100 years, with its highest being 144. Data from the 1831 census shows that the main sector of employment for males aged over 20 was agricultural labourers, followed by farmers who employed the labourers. As the population was very small agricultural labourers made up roughly a fifth of the population. Due to the main employment sector being agricultural the predominant social class of the males in Neenton was labourers and servants, the second most common social class was employers, professionals and middling sorts. After 1901 the population declined; as a result the population density was exceptionally lower than the average for England and Wales, due to the low population growth and sometimes the population declined

Population data from 1801 to 1961
Year	Population 20 years earlier	Population 10 years earlier	Current Total Population
1801	–	–	120
1811	–	120	134
1821	–	134	119
1831	–	119	120
1841	–	120	144
1851	–	144	116
1881	–	132	141
1891	–	141	135
1901	–	135	101
1911	–	101	91
1921	–	91	72
1931	–	72	91
1951	91	–	83
1961	–	83	100

== The Register of Neenton ==
Neenton, in the Domesday Book is called Newentone and also states that Lord Rowton is the principal landowner, and lord of the manor and patron of the advowson. The first Register extends from 1558 to 1663 and consists of 22 parchment pages, size about 22 inches by 6 1/2 inches, in a parchment cover. The second register extends from 1664 to 1721, which consists of 11 leaves of parchment, 13 inches by 5 1/2 inches, in a parchment cover. The third Register is a small thick quarto volume, measuring about 8 inches by 6 inches, and more than one inch thick.

== Present ==
The 2001 Census showed a slight increase in the population since 1831 where the population was 120 persons, the most recent census (2011) revealed that the population was 142 persons. There are 52 households living in Neenton, the majority consisting of one couple with dependent children as there is a school nearby in the town of Bridgnorth which children can go to from the age of 11, until 18. As a result, the predominant household is couples with dependent children, the main age group are persons aged between 24 and 44, followed by the age group 45–68, with the mean age of the population being 40.49 years of age.

== All Saints Church ==
The All Saints Church is located on the corner of the B4364 passing through Neenton. The church was rebuilt in a neo, or a pretend, 13th Century design in 1871 by Sir Arthur Blomfield, using ancient stone and has a turret containing two bells. Its stained-glass east window, by Morris & Co., was unveiled in October 1921 as a memorial to three local men who died in World War I, among those named being Frank Amies whose family, resident in Neenton for nearly a century, made the pulpit and some important woodwork in the church, as well as the oak plaque to his own memory on the south wall.

== Notable people ==
- John Darras (c.1355-1408), landowner, soldier, politician, was lord of Neenton manor. His death by suicide was recordedly here.

== Shropshire Family History Society ==
The Shropshire Family History Society was founded in 1979 to provide a meeting place in Shropshire for all those interested in Family History. The Society is now a Registered Charity with roughly two thousand members worldwide, its membership is available to anyone who is interested in family history. Neenton is one of the parishes who is part of this society.

== See also ==
- Listed buildings in Neenton
