= David Holbache =

Member of the Parliament of England

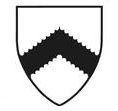
- Arms of David Holbache

Member of Parliament for Shropshire
- In office 1406–1411
- Preceded by: John Burley & John Darras
- Succeeded by: John Burley & Sir Adam Peshale

Member of Parliament for Shrewsbury
- In office May 1413 – April 1414
- Preceded by: Thomas Pride & John Whithiford
- Succeeded by: Thomas Pride

Member of Parliament for Shropshire
- In office April 1414 – 1415
- Preceded by: Robert Corbet & Richard Lacon
- Succeeded by: Hugh Burgh & George Hawkstone

Member of Parliament for Shrewsbury
- In office 1417–1419
- Preceded by: William Horde & Robert Horseley
- Succeeded by: Robert Corbet & David Rathbone

Personal details
- Born: c. 1350
- Died: 1422 (aged 71–72)
- Spouse: Gwenhwyfar ferch Ieuan
- Occupation: landowner, lawyer, politician, educator, philanthropist

Dafydd ab Ieuan (c. 1350 – 1422/23), better known by his English name David Holbache, was a Welsh politician, best known for founding Oswestry School in 1407.

== Family background ==
Dafydd, was born in the mid-14th century to Ieuan "Gôch" ap Dafydd ab Iorwerth and Angharad ferch Iorwerth ap Griffri "Fychan". His father's family had been seated at Pentrehylin, Dudleston, near Ellesmere, Shropshire since the early 13th century. Pentrehylin means 'Helyin's village' in English and is named for Holbache's ancestor Heilin ap Trahaearn ab Iddon. Heilin ap Trahaearn claimed descent from Tudur "Trefor" ab Ynyr, a 10th-century lord of Maelor Cantref and a founder of one of the Fifteen Tribes of Wales. His mother's family also claimed paternal descent from Trahaearn ab Iddon.

His inheritance was assumed by his uncles, Einion "Goch" and Madog "Goch".

== Career ==
Holbache first appears in 1376 as a legal advisor to the Earl of Arundel, who held the Lordship of Oswestry. He likely adopted the surname of Holbache to assist his assimilation into the English-controlled systems of governance, which limited opportunities and privileges for Welshmen. On 27 October 1377, he entered the acting service as King's pleader and attorney for Wales. In this capacity it is known he served as a commissioner for jail delivery (clearing out of inmates by trial) in Conway.

He was a member of parliament for Shropshire from 1406 to 1410 and in 1414.

In 1409 he was Deputy Steward of the Marcher Lordship of Bromfield and Yale.

== Oswestry School ==
In 1407, David and his wife, Gwenhwyfar ferch Ieuan, entrusted some of their lands situated in the Oswestry lordship to pay the wages of a schoolmaster, establishing what was to become Oswestry School. The school premises were a half-timbered building within the grounds of St. Oswald's Parish Church. The building still stands today and is the location of a heritage centre.

Due to poor record keeping, little written documentation survives for the school up until relatively recent times. The headmasters of the school are unknown for the first 154 years of the school's history. Documentation relating to the school increases slightly after the unification of England with Wales under the English crown.

== Marriage, issue and legacy ==
At around the turn of the 14th century he married Gwenhwyfar ferch Ieuan ab John (in English, Guinevere), of Sweeney, in Oswestry Parish, who brought with her lands in Sweeney, Treflach and Maesbury. By this marriage or by another women of the same name he is attributed a daughter, Gwensi, who is said to have married Robert Salter, of Oswestry. However, this is believed to be an invention, Holbache being recorded as dying without issue. His will, which was made 10 September 1421, was proved on 7 April 1423, but is no longer extant.

Parliament of England
Preceded by John Burley; John Darras	Member of Parliament for Shropshire; 1406–1411; With: Thomas Whitton 1406; Sir John Cornwall 1407–1409; John Burley 1410–1411	Succeeded by John Burley; Sir Adam Peshale
Preceded by Thomas Pride; John Whithiford	Member of Parliament for Shrewsbury; May 1413 – April 1414; With: Urian St Pierre	Succeeded by Thomas Pride unknown
Preceded by Robert Corbet; Richard Lacon	Member of Parliament for Shropshire; April 1414–1415; With: John Wele April 1414; Richard Lacon Nov 1414	Succeeded by Hugh Burgh; George Hawkstone
Preceded by William Horde; Robert Horseley	Member of Parliament for Shrewsbury; 1417–1419; With: William Horde	Succeeded by Roger Corbet; David Rathbone
