= Morfe Forest =

Medieval royal forest in Shropshire, England

Coordinates: 52.523°N 2.346°W

Morfe Forest was a medieval royal forest in east Shropshire.

The forest was perambulated in 1300 and the bounds were recorded. The forest was bounded by the River Severn on the west, by the River Worfe on the north and stretched east to Abbots Castle Hill and south into Kings Nordley.

At its core was a wood stretching from Bridgnorth to Six Ashes (near Enville) and Claverley. By the 17th century, the wood had become a heath, which was enclosed in 1805.

The forest takes its name from the manor of Morfe (in Enville) which was however not part of the forest.

== Moerheb ==
It has been suggested that the name Morfe is derived from an Old Celtic form Moerheb meaning "horse bramble" - an area of shrubs near where horses were kept. This might imply horse-breeding took place there in pre-Anglo-Saxon times. However the name Moerheb occurs only in a charter of 736 AD, the Ismere Diploma, granting land for the foundation of a minster in the province of Husmere, on both sides of the River Stour, with the wood of Cynibre (Kinver) on the north and the wood of Moerheb on the west. This is not possible for any place to be so located, if Moerheb is Morfe. On the other hand, the relationship to Kinver fits well with the minster being at Kidderminster. In that case, the wood of Moerheb would be a predecessor of Kidderminster Heath (now Devil's Spittleful and Rifle Range Nature Reserve and Habberley Valley).
