= Blakemere =

Parish in Herefordshire, England

Coordinates: 52°04′N 2°56′W

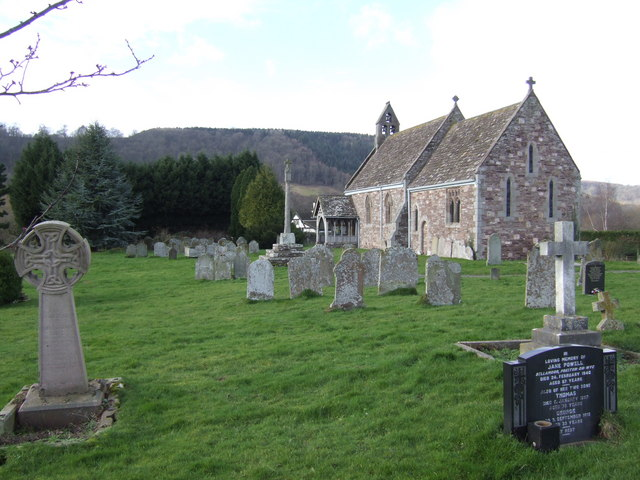
St Leonard's church, Blakemere

Blakemere is a parish and a hamlet in Herefordshire, England. The parish is 10 miles (16 km) west of Hereford, on the road to Hay-on-Wye.

== Distinguish from ==
- Blakemere visitors' centre near Sandiway in Cheshire
- Wyeside information page
