= William Gatacre =

William Gatacre may refer to:

- William Forbes Gatacre (1843–1906), British soldier
- William Gatacre (MP) (fl. 1499–1577), English politician
