= Rocke =

Rocke is a surname. Notable people with the surname include:

- Charles Rocke, English first-class cricketer
- Colin Rocke, Trinidad-American association footballer
- John Rocke, English banker and ornithologist
- Lisa Rocke, German swimmer
- Samuel Rocke, Australian politician

== See also ==
- Rock (surname)
- Roque (surname)
