= William Chorlton =

William Chorlton may refer to:

- William Wade, Baron Wade of Chorlton (1932–2018)
- William Charlton (died 1567) or William Chorlton, MP
