= High Sheriff of Shropshire =

Ceremonial officer of the English county of Shropshire

This is a list of sheriffs and high sheriffs of Shropshire

The sheriff is the oldest secular office under the Crown. Formerly the high sheriff was the principal law enforcement officer in the county but over the centuries most of the responsibilities associated with the post have been transferred elsewhere or are now defunct so that its functions are now largely ceremonial. From 1204 to 1344 the Sheriff of Staffordshire served also as the Sheriff of Shropshire.

Under the provisions of the Local Government Act 1972, on 1 April 1974 the office previously known as sheriff was retitled high sheriff. The high sheriff changes every March.

== Sheriff ==
=== 11th century ===
- Warin the Bald
- c. 1086 Rainald De Balliol, De Knightley (1040–1086)
- 1102 Hugh (son of Warin)

=== 12th century ===
- -1114: Alan fitz Flaad (died 1114)
- 1127–1137: Pain fitzJohn (died 1137)
- 1137–1138: William Fitz Alan (exiled 1138)
- 1155–1159: William Fitz Alan (died 1160)
- 1160–1165: Guy le Strange
- 1166–1169: Geoffrey de Vere
- 1170:Geoffrey de Vere and William Clericus
- 1171–1179: Guy le Strange
- 1180–1189: Hugh Pantulf, 4th Baron of Wem
- 1190–1201: William fitz Alan II (died 1210)

=== 13th and 14th centuries ===
- 1204–1344 See High Sheriff of Staffordshire
- 1208 Reginald de Lega (acting)
- 1228 (or before) Henry de Deneston
- 1228 Henry de Verdun (I)
- 1285: Sir Roger de Pulesdon (otherwise 'de Pyvelesdon')
- 1354–1359 John de Burton
- 1377: Sir John Burley
- 1377: Sir Bryan Cornwall of Burford, Shropshire
- 1378: John Ludlow
- 1379: John de Drayton
- 1380: Roger Hord
- 1381: John Shery
- 1382: Edward Acton of Longnor
- 1383: John de Stepulton
- 1384: Edward Acton of Longnor
- 1386: Nicholas de Sandford
- 1387: Robert de Lee
- 1388: John de la Pole (alias Mowetho), of Mawddwy and Wattlesborough
- 1388: Robert de Ludlow
- 1389: Edward Acton of Longnor
- 1390: John de Stepulton
- 1391: Sir William Hugford of Apley, Salop and Wilden, Beds
- 1392: Henry de Winesbury
- 1393: John de Eyton of Eyton upon the Weald Moors
- 1394: Thomas de Lee of South Bache in Diddlebury
- 1395: William Worthie
- 1396: Sir William Hugford of Apley, Salop and Wilden, Beds
- 1397–1398: Adamus de Pashal
- 1399: John Cornwall of Kinlet

=== 15th century ===
- 1400: Sir William Hugford of Apley, Salop and Wilden, Beds
- 1401–1402: John Darras of Sidbury and Neenton
- 1402–1403: Thomas Newport of High Ercall Hall
- 1403: Sir John Cornwall of Kinlet
- 1405: Thomas de Whitton of Whitton near Burford
- 1405: Sir John Cornwall of Kinlet
- 1406: William Brounshul
- 1407: John Burley of Broomscraft Castle
- 1408: Sir Roger Acton
- 1409: Edward Sprenghose of Plaish
- 1410: Robert Tiptrot
- 1413–1415: Sir Robert Corbet of Hadley
- 1415: Sir Richard Lacon of Lacon and Willey
- 1416: George Hawkstone of Hawkstone
- 1417: William Ludlow
- 1418: Adam Peshale
- 1419: Sir Robert Corbet of Moreton Corbet castle (died in office, 1420)
- 1420–1422: John Bruyn of Bridgnorth
- 1423: Hugo Harnage of Belswardyne and Sheinton
- 1424: Thomas le Strange
- 1425: William Burley
- 1426: Thomas Corbet of Leigh
- 1427: William Lichfield
- 1428: John Wynnesbury of Winsbury and Glazeley, Salop and Pillaton Hall in Penkridge, Staffs
- 1429: Hugh Burgh of Wattlesborough and Dinas Mawddwy, Merionethshire (died 1430) and Thomas Hopton of Rockhill
- 1430: Richard Archer
- 1431: John Bruyn of Bridgnorth
- 1432: John Ludlow
- 1433: Thomas Corbet de Ley
- 1434: Hugo Cresset of Upton Cressett
- 1435: Robert Inglefield of Berkshire
- 1436: William Ludlow
- 1437: William Lichfield
- 1438: Humphrey Low
- 1439–1440: Nicholas Eyton of Eyton Hall, near Wellington
- 1441: John Burgh
- 1442: William Ludlow
- 1443: Thomas Corbet
- 1444: Nicholas Eyton
- 1445: Hugo Cresset
- 1446: Sir Fulk Sprenghose of Plaish
- 1447: William Ludlow
- 1448: John Burgh
- 1449: Roger Eyton
- 1450: Thomas Herbert of Chirbury
- 1451: Sir William Lakyn of Willey
- 1452: John Burgh
- 1453: Robert Corbet
- 1454: Nicholas Eyton
- 1455: William Mitton
- 1456: Thomas Hord
- 1457: Fulk Sprencheaux
- 1459: Sir Thomas Cornwall of Burford, Shropshire
- 1460: Robert Corbet
- 1461: Sir Humphrey Blount Kt. of Kinlet Hall
- 1462–1463: Sir Roger Kynaston Kt of Hordley
- 1464: John Burgh
- 1465: Richard Lee
- 1466: Robert Eyton
- 1467: Sir Humphrey Blount Kt. of Kinlet Hall
- 1468: John Leighton of Watlesbury (1st term)
- 1469: Robert Cresset of Upton Cressett
- 1470: Roger Kinaston (arm.)
- 1471: Roger Kinaston (mil.)
- 1472: Robert Charlton
- 1473: William Newport of High Ercall Hall
- 1474: John Leighton (2nd term)
- 1475: Sir Humphrey Blount Kt. of Kinlet Hall
- 1476: John Heuui
- 1477: Richard Lakin of Willey
- 1478: Richard Ludlow
- 1479: Richard Lee (grandson of Robert, HS 1387)
- 1480: Sir Thomas Blount of Kinlet Hall
- 1481: John Harley
- 1482: John Leighton (3rd term)
- 1483: Thomas Mytton
- 1484: Thomas Hord
- 1485: Robert Cresset and Gilbert Talbot
- 1486: John Talbot
- 1487: Richard Laken
- 1488: Thomas Hord
- 1489: Edward Blount
- 1490: Richard Ludlow
- 1491: John Newport of High Ercall Hall
- 1492: William Young of Kenton
- 1493: Edward Blount
- 1494: Thomas Blount
- 1495: Thomas Leighton and Richard Lee
- 1496: Richard Lee
- 1497: Thomas Screvin
- 1498: Richard Laken
- 1499: Richard Harley

=== 16th century ===
- 1500: William Ottley of Pitchford
- 1501: John Newport
- 1502: Thomas Blount
- 1503–1504: Peter Newton of Hertley
- 1505: George Manwayring
- 1506: Thomas Cornwall (1st term)
- 1507: Sir Robert Corbet Kt. of Moreton Corbet castle
- 1508: Thomas Kynaston of Hordley.
- 1509: Sir Thomas Laykin of Willey
- 1510: John Newport
- 1511: Thomas Scriven
- 1512: Peter Newton
- 1513: William Ottley
- 1514: Thomas Laken
- 1515: Thomas Cornwall (2nd term)
- 1516: Robert Pigott of Chetwynd Hall, Newport
- 1517: Peter Newton
- 1518: Thomas Blount
- 1519: Thomas Cornwall (3rd term)
- 1520: John Salter of Oswestry
- 1521: George Bromley
- 1522: Peter Newton of Bromley
- 1523: Thomas Vernon of Hodnet
- 1524: Thomas Cornwall
- 1525: Sir John Corbet of Leigh
- 1526: Thomas Screvin
- 1527: John Talbot
- 1528: Sir Robert Needham of Shenton, Adderley
- 1529: Roger Corbet of Moreton Corbet
- 1530: John Blount died and replaced by Thomas Cornwall (4th term)
- 1531: Thomas Manwayring
- 1532: Thomas Laken
- 1533: Thomas Talbot
- 1534: Thomas Vernon
- 1535: Sir Robert Needham of Shenton, Adderley
- 1536: John Corbet of Leigh
- 1537: John Talbot
- 1538: Richard Manwayring
- 1539: Sir Richard Lakyn of Willey
- 1540: Sir Robert Needham of Shenton, Adderley
- 1541: John Talbot
- 1542: Thomas Newport of High Ercall Hall
- 1543: Richard Mytton of Shrewsbury and Halston and Dinas Mawddwy, Merionethshire
- 1544: Richard Manwayring
- 1545: Thomas Vernon
- 1546: Thomas Lee
- 1547: William Young
- 1548: Richard Cornwall of Burford
- 1549: Thomas Newport
- 1550: Sir Andrew Corbet, Kt of Moreton Corbet castle
- 1551: Richard Newport of High Ercall Hall (1st term)
- 1552: Sir Richard Maynewaring
- 1553: Sir Adam Mytton
- 1554: Richard Cornwall of Burford
- 1555: Sir Andrew Corbet, Kt of Moreton Corbet castle
- 1556: Sir Richard Leveson
- 1557: Richard Newport of High Ercall Hall (2nd term)
- 1558: Thomas Fermor of Horke Park, Bridgnorth
- 1559: Richard Mytton of Shrewsbury and Halston and Dinas Mawddwy, Merionethshire
- 1560: Richard Corbet of Poynton and Wortley, Yorks.
- 1561: Richard Cornwall of Burford
- 1562: Arthur Manwayring
- 1563: Sir George Blount of Kinlet Hall
- 1564: Robert Needham of Shenton, Adderley
- 1565: Humphrey Onslow
- 1566: Thomas Charlton and Thomas Eyton of Eyton Hall, near Wellington
- 1567: Edward Leighton of Wattlesborough Castle
- 1568: Richard Lewis
- 1569: Richard Newport of High Ercall Hall (3rd term)
- 1570: Sir Andrew Corbet, Kt of Moreton Corbet castle
- 1571: Rowland Lacon of Willey and Kinlet Hall
- 1572: William Gratewood
- 1573: Thomas Powell of Worthen
- 1574: Robert Pigott of Chetwynd Hall, Newport
- 1575: John Hopton
- 1576: Walter Leveson
- 1577: Arthur Maynwaring
- 1578: Francis Lawley of Spoon Hill
- 1579: William Young
- 1580: Edmund Cornwall of Burford, Shropshire
- 1581: William Gratewood
- 1582: Thomas Williams of Willaston
- 1583: Charles Foxe of Chainham
- 1584: Richard Cresset of Upton Cressett Hall
- 1585: Roul. Barker
- 1586: Francis Newport of High Ercall Hall (1st term)
- 1587: Robert Needham of Shenton, Adderley
- 1588: Edward Leighton of Wattlesborough Castle
- 1589: Thomas Cornwall
- 1590: Andrew Charleton
- 1591: William Hopton
- 1592: Robert Eyton
- 1593: Richard Corbet of Moreton Corbet castle
- 1594: Robert Powel
- 1595: Francis Albany of Fern Hill
- 1596: Robert Needham of Shenton, Adderley
- 1597: Edward Scriven
- 1598: Charles Fox
- 1599: Edward Kynaston of Oteley

=== 17th century ===
- 1600: Humphrey Lee
- 1601: Francis Newport of High Ercall Hall
- 1602: Francis Newton
- 1603: Roger Kynaston of Hordley.
- 1604: Sir Roger Owen of Condover Hall
- 1605: Humphrey Brigges of Ernestry Park, Ludlow
- 1606: Sir Henry Wallop of Red Castle (Feb–Nov)
- 1607: Sir Robert Needham of Shenton, Adderley (later Viscount Kilmorey)
- 1608: Edward Fox of Caynham and Ludlow and Gwern-y-go, Ceri, Montgomeryshire
- 1609: Robert Purslow of Sidbury
- 1610: Richard Mitton (Thornes?) of Holston
- 1611: Bonham Norton
- 1612: Sir Francis Lacon of Kinlet Hall
- 1613: Thomas Gervis
- 1614: John Cotes of Woodcote
- 1615: Thomas Pigott of Chetwynd Hall, Newport
- 1616: Thomas Cornwall
- 1617: Rowland Cotton of Alkington Hall, Whitchurch and Bellaport Hall, Norton-in-Hales
- 1618: Robert Owen of Woodhouse
- 1619: Thomas Harris of Boreatton
- 1620: William Whitmore of Apley Hall
- 1621: Walter Barker
- 1622: Thomas Edwards of Creete, Rushbury and Shrewsbury
- 1623: Sir William Owen of Condover Hall
- 1624: Walter Pigott of Chetwynd Hall, Newport
- 1625: Francis Charleton of Apley
- 1626: Sir Richard Newport of High Ercall Hall
- 1627: Richard Prince of Shrewsbury
- 1627: Samuel Wingfield of Preston Brockhurst
- 1628: Sir John Corbet, 1st Baronet, of Stoke upon Tern
- 1629: Walter Acton of Aldenham
- 1630: Humphrey Walcott (or Walcot) of Walcot
- 1631: Thomas Ireland of Abrington
- 1632: Sir Philip Eyton of Eyton Hall, near Wellington
- 1633: Thomas Thynne of Caus Castle
- 1634: Sir Thomas Cornwall of Burford, Shropshire
- 1635: John Newton of Heytley
- 1636: Robert Corbet (died 1676) of Stanwardine
- 1637: Sir Paul Harris, 2nd Baronet
- 1638: William Pierpoint of Tong Castle
- 1639: Richard Lee
- 1640: Roger Kynaston of Hordley.
- 1641: Thomas Nicholas of Shrewsbury
- 1642: John Welde of Willye
- 1643–1644: Civil war
- 1645: Thomas Mytton
- 1646: Robert Powel
- 1648: William Cotton
- 1649: Thomas Barker
- 1650:
- 1651: Sir Edward Corbet Kt.
- 1652: Francis Forester of Watling Street
- 1653: George Norton of Stretton
- 1654: Thomas Kynnersley of Badger Hall, near Bridgnorth
- 1655: Matthew Herbert
- 1656: Thomas Hunt of Boreatton Park
- 1657:Edward Waring
- 1658:
- 1659: William Oakeley of Oakeley
- 1660: John Walcot of Walcot
- 1661: John Cotes
- 1662:
- 1663: Isaac Jones
- 1664: Charles Mainwaring
- 1665: Francis Charlton of Apley Castle
- 12 November 1665: Sir Humphrey Briggs, 2nd Baronet, of Haughton Hall, Shifnal
- 7 November 1666: Francis Leveson Fowler
- 14 September 1667: Robert Owen, of Woodhouse
- 6 November 1668: Thomas Mackworth
- 11 November 1669: Richard Cresswell
- 4 November 1670: Philip Prince
- 9 November 1671: Rowland Hunt, of Plaish
- 11 November 1672: Thomas Ireland
- 10 November 1673: Edward Keneston
- 12 November 1673: Robert Clive, of Llych
- 5 November 1674: Charles Foster, of Everlicke or Evelocke
- 12 November 1674: Rowland Nicholls, of Boycott
- 15 November 1675: Sir John Corbet, 3rd Baronet, of Adderley Hall
- 10 November 1676: Roger Evans
- 15 November 1677: Francis Forester
- 17 November 1677: Thomas Cotton, of Powley
- 14 November 1678: Lingen Topp, of Whitton
- 13 November 1679: Edward Kynaston, of Oteley Park
- 4 November 1680: Thomas Hill, of Soulton
- 1682: Edward Kynaston of Hordley
- 1683: Henry Davenport
- 1684: Richard Lyster of Rowton Castle
- 1685: Sir Edward Acton, 3rd Baronet of Aldenham Park
- 1686: Richard Mytton of Halston, nr. Oswestry
- 1687: Ralph Browne of Caughley
- 1688: Robert Leighton of Wattlesborough Castle
- 1689: Jonathan Langley
- 1689: Francis Charlton
- 1690: John Kynaston of Hordley and Hardwick
- 1691: John Tayleur of Rodington
- 1692: Thomas Wingfield of Preston Brockhurst
- 1693: Sir Edward Leighton, 1st Baronet of Wattlesborough Castle
- 1694: Francis Prince
- 1694: Sir Roger Owen of Condover
- 1695: Richard More of Linley
- 1695: Richard Leighton
- 1696: Francis Herbert of Oakly Park, Ludlow
- 1697: Robert Pigott of Chetwynd Hall, Newport.
- 1698: Rowland Cotton of Etwall, Derbyshire and Bellaport
- 1699: Sir Francis Charlton, 2nd Baronet of Ludford House
- 1700: Thomas Jones of Shrewsbury

=== 18th century ===
- 1700: Sir Robert Corbet, 4th Baronet of Adderley and Stoke
- 1701: Thomas Pardoe of Faintree
- 1702: Edward Cressett of Cound
- 1703: Henry Biggs (afterwards High Sheriff of Montgomeryshire, 1704)
- 1704: Sir William Williams
- 1705: Thomas Childe of The Birch, Kinlet
- 1706: Bartholomew Lutley of Wolverton, Eaton under Heywood
- 1707: Robert Slaney, of Rudge and Hatton
- 1708: Roger Owen, of Condover
- 1709: Robert Burton of Longner, near Shrewsbury
- 1710: Charles Walcott (or Walcot) of Walcot
- 1711: Richard Cresswell
- 1712: William Fowler
- 1713: William Tayleur of Rodington (son of John, HS 1691)
- 1714: Bulkley Mackworth
- 1715: William Church
- 1716: Sir John Wolryche, 4th Baronet
- 1717: Thomas Powell of Park
- 1718: Thomas Hunt of Plaish
- 1719: Edward Browne
- 1720: Edward Jorden of Briersleigh
- 1721: John Kynnersley of Badger Hall, near Bridgnorth
- 1722: Bromwich Pope of Wolstanton
- 1723: William Cludde of Orleton Hall
- 1724: Richard Oakeley of Oakeley
- 1725: Francis Walker
- 1726: Richard Leighton, of Rodenhurst
- 1727: Sir Edward Leighton, 2nd Baronet, of Loton Park
- 1728: Sir Whitmore Acton, 4th Baronet of Aldenham Park
- 1729: Thomas Jenkins of Chorton Hill
- 1730: Thomas Harries of Weston Lizard
- 1731: Grey James Grove of Pool Hall, Alveley
- 1732: Sir Rowland Hill, Bt of Hawkstone
- 1733: Thomas Lloyd of Heightley
- 1734: Thomas Beal
- 1735: Sherington Davenport
- 1736: Thomas Lloyd of Heightley
- 1737: John Powell of Worthin
- 1738: Adam Ottley of Pitchford Hall
- 1739: Thomas Smyth of Stoke
- 1740: Richard Stanier, of Pepperhill
- 1741: Thomas Eyton of Eyton Hall, near Wellington
- 1742: Revel Moreton of Sheffnell
- 1743: Thomas Langley of Goulding
- 1744: William Tayleur of Shrewsbury
- 1745: Thomas Jones of Shrewsbury
- 1746: George Weld of Willey Park
- 1747: Sir Hugh Brigges Bt. of Haughton Hall, Shifnal
- 1748: Job Charlton of Park
- 1749: Charlton Leighton
- 1750: William Lutwiche of Brockton
- 1751: Sir Richard Acton of Aldenham Park
- 1752: Thomas Sandford of Sandford
- 1753: Rowland Wingfield of Onslow
- 1754: Edward Pemberton of Wrockwardine
- 1755: Francis Turner Blythe, of Shrewsbury
- 1756: Anthony Kinnersly of Leighton
- 1757: St John Charlton of Apley Castle
- 1758: John Amler of Ford House, Ford
- 1759: Samuel Griffith of Dinthill
- 1760: Thomas Jones of Shrewsbury
- 1761: John Smitheman of Madeley Wood, and later of West Coppice, Buildwas
- 1762: Thomas Powis of Great Berwick
- 1763: Thomas Burton
- 1764: Edward Rogers of Eaton
- 1765: John Topp of Whitton
- 1766: Charles Pigott of Peplow
- 1767: Thomas Ottley of Pitchford Hall
- 1768: Edward Botterell of the Heath
- 1769: John Owen of Woodhouse
- 1770: Richard Morhall of Onslow
- 1771: Joseph Griffiths of Dinthill
- 1772: Nicholas Smythe, of Nibley
- 1773: John Dod of Whitchurch
- 1774: Robert Pigott of Chetwynd Hall, Newport
- 1775: John Charlton Kinchant of Park Hall
- 1776: Thomas Jelf Powys of Berwick
- 1777: Dudley Acland of Millichap
- 1778: Sir Robert Corbet Kt. of Longnor
- 1779: Thomas Eyton of Eyton Hall, near Wellington
- 1780: Edward Horne, of Halesowen
- 1781: Edward Charles Windsor of Harnage Grange
- 1782: Charles Walcott of Walcot Hall
- 1783: Isaac Hawkins Browne of Badger Hall, near Bridgnorth
- 1784: William Child of Kinlet
- 1785: Robert More of Linley
- 1785: John Sparling of Petton
- 1786: Sir Robert Leighton, 5th Baronet of Loton
- 1787: John Robert Lloyd of Aston replaced by Humphrey Sandford of the Isle
- 1788: Joseph Muckleston of Prescot
- 1789: Joseph Oldham, of Cainham
- 1790: Saint John Charlton of Charlton
- 1791: Thomas Pardoe of Fairitree
- 1792: Thomas Crompton of Hopton Wafers
- 1793: John Corbet of Sundorne
- 1794: William Yelverton Davenport of Davenport House
- 1795: Henry Bevan of Shrewsbury
- 1796: Ralph Leake of Langford
- 1797: William Tayleur of Buntingsdale (son of William, HS 1713)
- 1798: Sir Andrew Corbet, 1st Baronet of Shawbury Park
- 1799: Thomas Dickin of Wem

=== 19th century ===
- 5 February 1800: William Chaloner, of Duddlestone
- 11 February 1801: Richard Lyster, of Rowton
- 18 February 1801: Thomas Clark, of Peplow
- 3 February 1802: William Ferriday, of Dawley Parva
- 3 March 1802: Thomas Harries, of Cruckton
- 3 February 1803: Thomas Kinnersley, of Leighton
- 1 February 1804: Robert Burton, of Longner Hall
- 6 February 1805: Thomas Whitmore, of Apley Hall
- 1 February 1806: William Botfield, of Malins Lee
- 4 February 1807: William Charlton, of Apley Castle
- 3 February 1808: Ralph Browne Wylde-Browne, of Caughley
- 6 February 1809: William Sparling, of Petton
- 31 January 1810: William Lloyd, of Aston (Note: There are seven places in Shropshire called Aston, and the source does not say which this one was. However, there are records of a Lloyd family of Aston Hall, Oswestry.)
- 8 February 1811: George Brooke, of Haughton
- 24 January 1812: Richard Lyster of Rowton Castle
- 10 February 1813: William Church Norcop, of Belton House
- 4 February 1814: William Cludde, of Orleton Hall
- 13 February 1815: (Frederic) Farmer Taylor, of Chyknell
- 1816: Sir Thomas Tyrwhitt-Jones, 2nd Baronet of Stanley Hall
- 1817: William Ormsby-Gore of Porkington
- 1818: Thomas Botfield of Hopton Court
- 1819: Edward William Smythe Owen of Condover
- 1820: Thomas Taylor of Ellerton
- 1821: Richard Heber, of Hodnett
- 1822: Robert Bridgman More, of Linley
- 1823: John Mytton of Halston, Salop. (Mad Jack Mytton)
- 1824: John Wingfield of Onslow
- 1825: John Whitehall Dod of Cloverley Hall
- 1826: John Cotes of Woodcote Hall
- 1827: William Tayleur of Buntingsdale
- 1828: William Lacon Childe of Kinlet Hall
- 1829: Charles Kynaston Mainwaring of Oteley Park
- 1830: Rowland Hunt of Boreatton Park
- 1831: Sir Edward Joseph Smythe, 6th Baronet, of Acton Burnell Castle
- 1832: William Oakeley, of Oakeley
- 1833: Walter Moseley, of Buildwas Park
- 1834: Henry Wentworth Powys, of Berwick House
- 1835: Sir Baldwin Leighton, 7th Baronet, of Loton Park
- 1836: Sir William Rouse-Boughton, 2nd Baronet, of Downton
- 1837: Thomas Henry Hope, of Netley Hall
- 1838: William Wolryche Whitmore, of Dudmaston
- 1839: Peter Broughton, of Tunstall
- 1840: Thomas Eyton, of Eyton Hall, near Wellington
- 1841: Gustavus Frederick Hamilton, of Burwarton
- 1842: Henry Justice, of Hinstock
- 1843: Sir Andrew Corbet, 2nd Baronet, of Acton Reynald Hall
- 1844: John Charles Burton Borough, of Chetwynd Park
- 1845: St John Chiverton Charlton, of Apley Castle
- 1846: Richard Henry Kinchant, of Park Hall
- 1847: Joseph Venables Lovett, of Belmont
- 1848: William Henry Francis Plowden, of Plowden
- 1849: Panton Corbett, of Longnor
- 1850: Ralph Merrick Leeke, of Longford
- 1851: Robert Henry Cheney, of Badger Hall
- 1852: Robert Burton, of Longner Hall
- 1853: Algernon Charles Heber-Percy, of Hodnet Hall
- 1854: Robert Aglionby Slaney, of Walford Manor
- 1855: Willoughby Hurt Sitwell, of Bucknell
- 1856: Edward Lloyd Gatacre, of Gatacre Hall, Bridgenorth
- 1857: Sir William Curtis, 3rd Baronet, of Caynham Court, Caynham
- 1858: Edmund Wright, of Halston
- 1859: Charles Orlando Childe Pemberton, of Millichope Park
- 1860: Sir Charles Henry Rouse-Boughton, 11th Baronet, of Downton Hall, Stanton Lacy
- 1861: George Pritchard, of Broseley
- 1862: Sir Vincent Rowland Corbet, 3rd Baronet, of Acton Reynald Hall
- 1863: Thomas Charlton Whitmore, of Apley Park
- 1864: David Francis Atcherley, of Marton Hall
- 1865: Francis Harries, of Cruckton
- 1866: Thomas Hugh Sandford, of Sandford
- 1867: Sir Charles Frederick Smythe, 7th Baronet, of Acton Burnell Castle
- 1868: Charles Spencer Lloyd, of Leaton Knolls
- 1869: John Rocke, of Clungunford
- 1870: Salusbury Kynaston Mainwaring, of Oteley Park
- 1871: William Kenyon Slaney, of Hatton Grange
- 1872: John Henniker Lovett, of Fern Hill, Oswestry
- 1873: Charles George Wingfield, of Onslow, Shrewsbury
- 1874: Richard Thomas Lloyd, of Aston Hall, Oswestry
- 1875: Sir Henry George Harnage, 3rd Baronet, of Belswardine
- 1876: Arthur Mostyn Owen, of Woodhouse
- 1877: Sir Henry Thomas Tyrwhitt, 3rd Baronet, of Stanley Hall, Bridgnorth
- 1878: The Honourable Robert Charles Herbert, of Orleton
- 1879: Henry de Grey Warter, of Longden Manor
- 1880: Charles Donaldson-Hudson, of Cheswardine Hall
- 1881: Robert Jasper More, of Linley Hall
- 1882: James Jenkinson Bibby, of Hardwicke Grange, Hadnall
- 1883: William Orme Foster, of Apley Park
- 1884: Charles John Morris, of Oxon
- 1885: William Edward Montagu Hulton-Harrop, of Lythwood Hall
- 1886: Arthur Sparrow, of Preen Manor
- 1887: Sir Offley Wakeman, 3rd Baronet, of Rorrington Lodge, Chirbury
- 1888: Arthur Pemberton Heywood-Lonsdale, of Shavington Hall
- 1889: John Tayleur, of Buntingsdale, Market Drayton
- 1890: Thomas Slaney Eyton, of Walford Hall, Shrewsbury
- 1891: Sir Edward Ripley, 2nd Baronet, of Bedstone Court, Bucknell,
- 1892: Henry Reginald Corbet, of Adderley Hall, Market Drayton
- 1893: John Derby Allcroft, of Stokesay Court, Onibury
- 1894: Francis Stanier, of Peplow Hall, Market Drayton
- 1895: Edward Wood, of Culmington Manor, Craven Arms
- 1896: William Henry Whitaker, of Totterton Hall, Lydbury North
- 1897: John Baddeley Wood, of Henley Hall, Ludlow
- 1898: Sir Walter Orlando Corbet, 4th Baronet, of Acton Reynald, Shrewsbury
- 1899: Hugh Ker Colville, of Bellaport Hall, Market Drayton

=== 20th century ===
- 1900: Frank Bibby of Sansaw Hall, near Shrewsbury
- 1901: John Sidney Burton-Borough of Chetwynd Park, Newport
- 1902: James Augustine Harvey Thursby-Pelham of Cound Hall, Shrewsbury
- 1903: William Henry Foster of Apley Park, Bridgnorth
- 1904: Herbert James Hope-Edwards of Netley, Dorrington, Shrewsbury
- 1905: Charles Edward Morris of Oxon, near Shrewsbury
- 1906: Alfred Edmund William Darby of Adcote, near Baschurch
- 1907: Charles Francis Kynaston Mainwaring of Oteley Park, Ellesmere
- 1908: Algernon Heber-Percy, of Hodnet Hall, Market Drayton
- 1909: Alfred Wynne Corrie of Park Hall, Oswestry
- 1910: Sir Raymond Robert Tyrwhitt-Wilson Bt (later Baron Berners) of Stanley Hall.
- 1911: Edward Brocklehurst Fielden of Condover Hall, Shrewsbury
- 1912: Alexander Cowan McCorquodale, of Cound Hall, Shrewsbury
- 1913: Charles Ralph Borlase Wingfield of Onslow, near Shrewsbury.
- 1914: Sir William St Andrew Rouse-Boughton of Downton Hall, Stanton Lacy.
- 1915: William Swire of Longden Manor, Shrewsbury
- 1916: James Volant Wheeler of Bitterley Court, Bitterley, Ludlow
- 1917: John Reid Walker of Ruckley Grange, Shifnal
- 1918: John Henry Arthur Whitley of Bourton, Much Wenlock
- 1919: Lt Col Nathaniel Ffarington Eckersley of The Trench, Wem
- 1920: Henry Ernest Whittaker of Ludford Park, Ludlow
- 1921: Captain James Whittaker of Winsley Hall, Shrewsbury
- 1922: Colonel John Robert Howard-McLean of Aston Hall, Shifnal
- 1923: Alfred Rowland Clegg of Nash Court near Tenbury
- 1924: Captain Harry Anthony Van Bergen of Ferney Hall, near Craven Arms
- 1925: Humphrey Sandford, of The Isle, Shrewsbury
- 1926: Norman William Howard-McLean, of Brereton Hall
- 1927: Lieut.-Col. Ralph Charles Donaldson–Hudson of Cheswardine, Market Drayton
- 1928: Major Herbert Rushton Sykes, of Lydham Manor, Bishops Castle.
- 1929: Capt. Frank Brian Frederic Bibby, of Sansaw, Shrewsbury.
- 1930: John Arthur Gwynn Sparrow, of Albrighton Hall, Shrewsbury
- 1931: Lieut.-Col. Harold Platt Sykes, of Longford Hall, Newport
- 1932: Major Arthur William Foster of Apley Park, Bridgnorth
- 1933: John Russell Allcroft, of Stokesay Court, Onibury
- 1934: Sir Offley Wakeman of Yeaton Peverey House, near Shrewsbury
- 1935: Robert Orlando Rodolph Kenyon-Slaney of Hatton Grange, Shifnal
- 1936: Lt Col Francis Henry Cecil Weld-Forester of Decker Hill, Shifnal
- 1937: Joseph Eccles, of Halston Hall, Whittington, Oswestry
- 1938: Col. Charles Reginald Morris-Eyton of Walford Manor, Baschurch, Shrewsbury
- 1939: Major Charles Morris Threlfall, of Ruyton Manor, Shrewsbury
- 1940: Sir Edward Hotham Rouse-Boughton of Downton Hall, Stanton Lacy.
- 1941: Lieut.-Col. Roger Arthur Mostyn-Owen, of Woodhouse, Oswestry
- 1942: Major Anthony Charles Stevens Bovill, of Mytton Hall, Montford Bridge, Shrewsbury
- 1943: Lieut.-Col. John Nicholas Price Wood, of Henley Hall, Ludlow
- 1944: Major Lawrence Warner Wyld Lees, of Old Hall, Cheswardine, Market Drayton
- 1945: Lieut.-Colonel George Paton Pollitt of Harnage Grange, Cressage, Shrewsbury
- 1946: Wiston John Kynnersley-Browne of Leighton Hall, Shrewsbury
- 1947: Reginald Adam Black, of Prees Hall, Whitchurch
- 1948: Folliott Sandford Neale, of Berwick House, Shrewsbury
- 1949: Captain Codrington Gwynne Reid Walker, of Ruckley Grange, Shifnal
- 1950: Major Reginald Culcheth Holcroft, of Wrentnall House, Pulverbatch, Shrewsbury
- 1951: Brigadier Sir Alexander Beville Gibbons Stanier, 2nd Baronet of The Citadel, Weston, Shrewsbury.
- 1952: Lieut-Colonel William Warburton Hayes, of Harcourt, Stanton, Shrewsbury.
- 1953: Charles Wingfield of Onslow, near Shrewsbury.
- 1954: Lieut.-Colonel Edward Anthony Fielden of Court of Hill, Ludlow
- 1955: Arthur Frederick Vavasour McConnell, of Hampton Hall, Worthen
- 1956: Brevet-Colonel Sir Richard Tihel Leighton, Bt. of Loton Park
- 1957: ? Col. J.S. Burton Borough, of Chetwynd Park, Newport.
- 1957: Lieut-Colonel Arthur Heywood-Lonsdale, of Shavington, Market Drayton
- 1958: Sir Oliver William Hargreaves Leese, of Lower Hall, Worfield, Bridgnorth.
- 1959: Captain Richard William Corbett of The Dower House, Longnor, near Shrewsbury.
- 1960: Arthur Nicholas Fielden, of Cruckton Cottage, Shrewsbury.
- 1961: Lieut.-Colonel Arthur Patrick Sykes of Lydham Manor, Bishop's Castle.
- 1962: Brigadier James Norman Ritchie of Yeaton House, Baschurch
- 1963: Major Edward Fitzhardinge Peyton Gage, of Chyknell, Bridgnorth
- 1964: Charles Hugh Rogers-Coltman of The Home, Bishop's Castle
- 1965: Brigadier Gordon Forbes Maclean of Pentreheylin, Maesbrook, Llanymynech.
- 1966: Lieut.-Colonel Sir John Vincent Corbet, 7th Baronet of Acton Reynald, Shrewsbury.
- 1967: William Francis Godfrey Plowden of Plowden Hall, Lydbury North.
- 1968: John Leigh Reed of Sidbury Hall, Bridgnorth.
- 1969: Peter George Culcheth Holcroft of Eaton Mascott Hall, Berrington, near Shrewsbury.
- 1970: Major Hubert Robert Holden of Sibdon Castle, Craven Arms.
- 1971: John Seymour Evan Rocke of Clungunford House, Craven Arms.
- 1972: Major Francis John Yates, of The Wood, Codsall Wood, near Wolverhampton
- 1973: Robert Ivan Kenyon-Slaney of Hatton Grange, Shifnal.

== High sheriffs ==
=== 20th century ===
- 1974: Captain John Michael George Lumsden of Henley Hall, Ludlow.
- 1975: Colonel Guy Mytton Thornycroft, of The Mount, Cressage, near Shrewsbury
- 1976: Lieut.-Col. Robert Charles Henry Armitstead, of Stoke Court, Greete, Ludlow
- 1977: Peter Howard Thompson, of Coton Hall, Bridgnorth
- 1978: John Anthony Fielden, of Court of Hill, Ludlow.
- 1979: William Simon Rodolph Kenyon-Slaney, of Chyknell, Bridgnorth.
- 1980: Lieut-Colonel Robert Charles Gilfrid Morris-Eyton, of Calvington Manor, Newport.
- 1981: Vesey Martin Edward Holt, of Orleton Hall, Wellington, Telford.
- 1982: John Cyril Yeoward of Newcastle Court, Clun, Craven Arms
- 1983: David Langdon Upton Scott, of Harnage Grange, Cressage.
- 1984: Christopher Ronald Thompson, of Aldenham Park, near Bridgnorth.
- 1985: Christopher Stephen Motley, of Chilton Grove, Atcham, near Shrewsbury
- 1986: Timothy Claud Heywood-Lonsdale, of The Old Laundry, Shavington, Market Drayton.
- 1987: Algernon Eustace Hugh Heber-Percy of Hodnet Hall, Market Drayton
- 1988: Roger Everard Angell-James, of Berwick House, Shrewsbury.
- 1989: David Robin Bibby Thompson of Sansaw, Clive, Shrewsbury.
- 1990: Denis Peareth Hornell Lennox, of The Old Mill, Bayton, near Kidderminster, Worcestershire, died and was replaced by Hugh Bernard Meynell, of Brockton Court, Shifnal
- 1991: Lionel Richard Jebb, of The Lyth, Ellesmere.
- 1992: Edward Martin Amphlett Thompson, of The Bolt Hole, Six Ashes, Bridgnorth.
- 1993: Roger Michael Gabb
- 1994: Jeremy Hugh Gifford Lywood of Ashford Court, Ashford Carbonell, Ludlow.
- 1995: Nicholas Edward Egerton Stephens of Grafton Lodge, Montford Bridge, Shrewsbury.
- 1996: Timothy William Edward Corbett, of The Dower House, Longnor, Shrewsbury.
- 1997: Elizabeth Catherine Weld-Forester, Baroness Forester, of Willey Park
- 1998: Lindsay Claude Neils Bury, of Millichope Park, Munslow, Craven Arms.
- 1999: Jonathan Rupert Blakiston Lovegrove-Fielden, of Longden Manor, Pontesford, Shrewsbury

=== 21st century ===
- 2000: Richard Panton Corbett, of Grove Farm House, Longnor
- 2001: John Richard Ravenscroft, of The Old Rectory
- 2002: John Nicholas Richard Neville Bishop, of Shipton Hall
- 2003: Julian Veronica Morgan, of 1 Silk Mill Lane, Ludlow
- 2004: Humphrey Salwey of The Lodge, Overton
- 2005: Michael John Lowe
- 2006: Anthony Richard Tanner
- 2007: Meriel Rose Afia
- 2008: Anne Gee
- 2009: Anna Turner
- 2010: Hugh Trevor-Jones
- 2011: Richard Henry Burbidge of Ford, Shrewsbury
- 2012: John Abram of Oswestry
- 2013: Diana Rosemary Flint of Eastwick, Ellesmere
- 2014: Robert John Bowring Bland of Cressage, Nr Shrewsbury
- 2015: David Robert Stacey of Leigh Manor, Hope, Shrewsbury
- 2016: Christine Mary Holmes, of Shrewsbury
- 2017: Charles Edward Lillis, of Whittington
- 2018: Rhoderick Martin Swire, of Ludlow
- 2019: Dr Jeremy John Dixey, of Westbury, Shrewsbury
- 2020: Amanda Nadine Harris of Shrewsbury
- 2021: Robert Anthony Morris-Eyton of Calvington
- 2022: Selina Lucy Graham, of Broseley
- 2023: Amanda Jillian Thorn, of Leighton
- 2024: Brian Welti, of Shrewsbury
- 2025: Jane Marie Trowbridge, of Ellesmere
- 2026: Katherine Elizabeth Anne Tanner, of Church Stretton
