= William Tresham =

English politician (died 1450)

Sir William Tresham JP (d. 22 September 1450) was an English lawyer who served as Speaker of the House of Commons until 1450.

Born in Northamptonshire, the son of Thomas Tresham of Sywell, he went on to become a major landowner in the region. He first appears in the records as a mainpernor in Chancery in 1415 and was elected as a Knight of the shire for the parliament of 1423, and again in 1427, 1429, 1432, 1433, 1435, 1439, 1442, 1445, 1447 and February and November 1449, serving in twelve successive parliaments overall. In 1424 he was also appointed a Justice of the Peace for Northamptonshire; a man born of common stock relied on advancement in his home county for advancement nationally. Having trained as a lawyer, Tresham spent intermittent periods in the service of the king, such as in 1415, when he reviewed the accounts of the King's officials in southern Wales.

It is assumed he concentrated on his legal career in the 1420s, where there are few records of his activities, but in 1430 he was appointed as a councillor to Humphrey Stafford, 1st Duke of Buckingham, and continued to receive a salary until at least 1447. In 1432 he was made one of the two Attorneys-general of Henry Beaufort, and spent much of the 1430s on various commissions of the crown, including one to Northamptonshire in 1434 to investigate the hiding of royal funds, and another in 1439 to look at the value of royal lands, again in Northamptonshire. He was employed by the royal household as an apprentice-at-law and thus secured a tie with them; this is likely why he was elected Speaker of the House of Commons for the 1439 Parliament, when there were attempts to reform the King's household. In 1438 he bought Rushton Hall in Northamptonshire as a family seat.

He was again elected Speaker in 1442 and 1447 and continued his royal service, mainly for the Duchy of Lancaster, and worked as an Apprentice-at-law between 1444 and 1447. He was made a feoffee of the duchy estates in 1446 and in 1448 was made a chancellor of those feoffees, followed by an appointment as Chancellor of the Duchy of Lancaster on 3 July 1442.

Although, in the words of the historian Simon Payling, Tresham was "a notorious extortioner", he was much-liked at court, and as a result was appointed to politically sensitive cases, such as the 1444 commission to investigate charges of treason against Thomas Carver, and a 1447 commission directed at members of the household of Humphrey, Duke of Gloucester. In 1450 he was himself indicted for treason in the aftermath of Jack Cade's rebellion in Kent, but before any sort of commission could take place he was murdered. While travelling to meet with Richard of York with his son, Sir Thomas Tresham, the pair were assaulted by a group of local men with whom Tresham was in a property dispute. William was killed, and Thomas escaped injured.

Parliament of England
Preceded by Unknown	Member of Parliament for Northamptonshire; 1423–1449	Succeeded by Unknown
Preceded by William Burley	Speaker of the House of Commons; 1439–1442	Succeeded by William Burley
Preceded by William Burley	Speaker of the House of Commons; 1446–1447	Succeeded by Sir John Say
Preceded by Sir John Popham	Speaker of the House of Commons; 1449–1450	Succeeded by Sir William Oldhall
Preceded by Walter Sherington	Chancellor of the Duchy of Lancaster; 1442–1449	Succeeded by John Say
