= Shropshire (constituency) =

Parliamentary constituency in the United Kingdom, 1801–1832

Shropshire / Salop
- Former county constituency for the House of Commons
- Extract from 1831 result: the dark blue area.

1290–1832
- Seats: two
- Replaced by: North Shropshire and South Shropshire

Shropshire (a.k.a. Salop) was a constituency of the House of Commons of the Parliament of England, then of the Parliament of Great Britain from 1707 to 1800, and of the Parliament of the United Kingdom from 1801 to 1832. It was represented by two Knights of the Shire. It was split into North Shropshire and South Shropshire in 1832.

== Boundaries ==
The county limits.

== History ==
Shropshire by the mid eighteenth century was seen as an independent county seat, controlled by the rank and file of the country gentry and tended to return Tory MPs despite the borough seats within Shropshire, and the dominant local Herbert and Clive families, being Whig. From 1753 onwards there was a compromise by which the Tory country gentlemen chose the County MPs while the Herberts chose for Shrewsbury.

== Members of Parliament ==
- Constituency created (1290)

=== MPs 1290–1653 ===
Parliament	First member	Second member
1298	Sir Peter de Eyton	
1298	William de Hodnet	
1301	Sir Peter de Eyton	
1305	Sir Richard de Harley	
1307	? Ludlow	
1309	Roger Corbet of Caus	
1312–1318	Robert de Leighton	
1320	Sir William de Sondford, Kt	
1328	? Ludlow	
1337	? Hopton	
1361	? Ludlow	
1364	? Hopton	
1369–1383	Brian Cornwall (6 times)	
1371–1382	Sir Robert Kendale (5 times)	
1373	? Ludlow	
1377	? Ludlow	
1377	Sir William Chetwynd	
1378	Edward Acton	
1380	Sir Peter Carswell	
1382	Sir Peter Carswell	
1382 (Oct)	Edward Acton	
1384 (Apr)	Edward Acton	
1384 (Nov)	Edward Acton	
1385	Thomas Lee of South Bache in Diddlebury	Sir William Hugford
1386	Edward Acton	Hamon Peshale
1388 (Feb)	Sir William Hugford	Sir Richard Ludlow
1388 (Sep)	Edward Acton	Sir Hugh Cheyne
1390 (Jan)	Thomas Lee of South Bache in Diddlebury	Sir Richard Ludlow
1390 (Nov)	Thomas Whitton	Sir Richard Ludlow
1391	Sir Hugh Cheyne	Sir Roger Corbet
1393	John Darras	Sir William Hugford
1394	Sir Adam Peshale	Sir William Hugford
1395	John Longford	Thomas Young
1397 (Jan)	William Lee I	Fulk Sprenghose
1397 (Sep)	Richard Chelmswick	Sir Fulk Pembridge
1399	John Burley	Thomas Young
1401	John Burley	Sir Hugh Cheyne
1402	Sir John Cornwall	Sir Adam Peshale
1404 (Jan)	John Burley	George Hawkstone
1404 (Oct)	John Burley	John Darras
1406	David Holbache	Thomas Whitton
1407	Sir John Cornwall	David Holbache
1410	John Burley	David Holbache
1411	John Burley	Sir Adam Peshale
1413 (Feb)		
1413 (May)	Robert Corbet	Richard Lacon
1414 (Apr)	David Holbache	John Wele
1414 (Nov)	David Holbache	Richard Lacon
1415	Hugh Burgh	George Hawkstone
1416 (Mar)	Hugh Burgh	Edward Sprenghose
1416 (Oct)		
1417	William Burley	Richard Fox
1419	William Burley	Robert Corbet
1420	William Burley	John Wynnesbury
1421 (May)	William Burley	Hugh Burgh
1421 (Dec)	Sir Richard Lacon	John Stapleton
1422	William Burley	Hugh Burgh
1423	Sir Richard Lacon	
1425	William Burley	Hugh Burgh
1427	William Burley	
1429	William Burley	Roger Corbet (died 1430)
1431	William Burley	Sir Richard Lacon
1432	William Burley	John Wynnesbury
1433	William Burley	Sir Richard Lacon
1437	William Burley	
1439	William Burley	
1442	William Burley	
1445	William Burley	
1449 (Nov)	William Burley	
1450	William Burley	
1455	William Burley	
1485	Sir Thomas Leighton	
1491	Sir Gilbert Talbot	Sir Richard Corbet
1510–1523	No names known	
1529	Sir Thomas Cornwall	John Blount
1536	Richard Trentham	?
1539	Richard Mytton	John Corbet
1542		
1545	Sir George Blount	Richard Mytton
1547	Sir George Blount	Richard Newport
1553 (Mar)	Richard Mytton	Thomas Vernon
1553 (Oct)	Richard Mytton	Edward Leighton
1554 (Apr)	William Charlton	Francis Kynaston
1554 (Nov)	Richard Mytton	William Gatacre
1555	Sir Andrew Corbet	Sir Henry Stafford
1558	Richard Corbet	Thomas Fermor
1559 (Jan)	Sir Andrew Corbet	Sir Arthur Mainwaring
1562–1563	Richard Corbet, died and replaced 1566 by Robert Corbet	Sir Edward Leighton
1571	Sir George Blount	George Bromley
1572 (Apr)	George Bromley	George Mainwaring
1584 (Nov)	Walter Leveson	Francis Bromley
1586 (Oct)	Richard Corbet II	Walter Leveson
1588 (Nov)	(Sir) Walter Leveson	Richard Leveson
1593	Francis Newport II	Sir Robert Needham
1597 (Sep)	Sir Henry Bromley	Thomas Leighton
1601 (Sep)	John Egerton	Roger Owen
1604	Sir Richard Leveson	Sir Robert Needham
1606	Sir Roger Owen	Sir Robert Needham
1614	Sir Roger Owen	Sir Richard Newport
1621	Sir Robert Vernon	Sir Francis Kynaston
1624	Sir Richard Newport	Sir Andrew Corbet
1625	Sir Richard Newport	Sir Andrew Corbet
1626	Sir Rowland Cotton	Sir Richard Leveson
1628	Sir Richard Newport	Sir Andrew Corbet
1629–1640	No Parliaments convened	
1640 (Apr)	William Pierrepont	Sir Vincent Corbet, 1st Baronet
1640 (Nov)	Sir Richard Lee, 2nd Baronet, disabled Sep 1642	Sir Richard Newport. ennobled 1642
1645	Sir John Corbet, 1st Baronet, of Stoke upon Tern	Humphrey Edwards
1648	Humphrey Edwards	one member only
1653	William Bottrell	Thomas Baker

=== MPs 1654–1660 ===
Parliament	First member	Second member	Third member	Fourth member
1654	Humphrey Mackworth snr.	Thomas Mytton	Robert Corbet	Philip Young
1658	Thomas Mackworth	Samuel More	Andrew Lloyd	Philip Young
1659	Thomas Mackworth	Philip Young	two members only	

=== MPS 1660–1832 ===
Year	First member	First party	Second member	Second party
1660	Sir William Whitmore, 2nd Baronet		Henry Vernon	
1661	Sir Francis Lawley		Sir Richard Ottley	
1670	Sir Francis Lawley		Hon. Richard Newport	Whig
1679	Sir Vincent Corbet, 2nd Baronet		Hon. Richard Newport	Whig
1681	William Leveson-Gower		Hon. Richard Newport	Whig
1685	Edward Kynaston		John Walcot	
1689	Edward Kynaston		Hon. Richard Newport	Whig
1698	Edward Kynaston		Sir Edward Leighton	
1699	Robert Lloyd		Sir Edward Leighton	
Jan. 1701	Robert Lloyd		Sir Humphrey Briggs	
Dec. 1701	Robert Lloyd		Richard Corbet	
1702	Roger Owen		Richard Corbet	
1705	Sir Robert Corbet		Robert Lloyd	
1708	Sir Robert Corbet		Lord Newport	
1710	John Kynaston		Robert Lloyd	
1713	John Kynaston		Lord Newport	
1715	Sir Robert Corbet		Lord Newport	
1722	John Kynaston		Robert Lloyd	
1727	John Walcot		William Lacon Childe	
1734	Sir John Astley		Corbet Kynaston	
1740	Sir John Astley		Richard Lyster	
1766	Sir John Astley		Charles Baldwyn	
1772	Sir Watkin Williams-Wynn		Charles Baldwyn	
1774	Noel Hill		Charles Baldwyn	
1780	Noel Hill		Sir Richard Hill	
1784	John Kynaston		Sir Richard Hill	
1806	John Kynaston		John Cotes	
1821	John Kynaston		Rowland Hill	
1822	John Cressett-Pelham		Rowland Hill	

- Constituency abolished (1832)

== See also ==
- Parliamentary constituencies in Shropshire#Historical constituencies
- List of former United Kingdom Parliament constituencies
- Unreformed House of Commons
