= Thomas Cornwall =

8th feudal baron of Buford

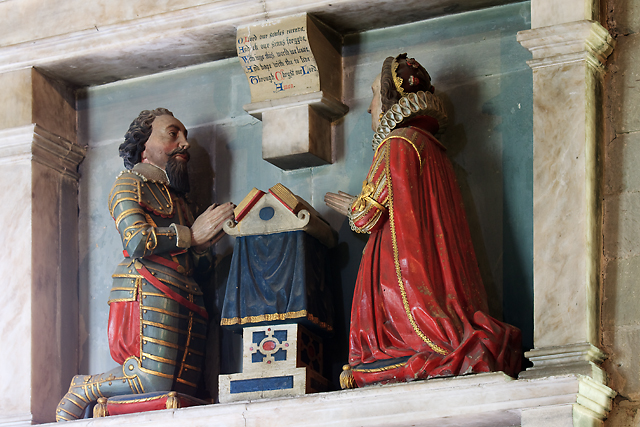
Monument to Cornwall and his wife Anne (née Corbet)

Sir Thomas Cornwall (1468–1537; also spelled Cornewaylle) was the 8th feudal baron of Burford. He was knighted in 1497. (Note: dates of birth vary to 1472 to 1474 according to other sources)

He was born the son of Sir Edmund Cornwall of Burford, Shropshire. He succeeded his father in 1489, was knighted at the Battle of Blackheath in 1497, and made a knight banneret in 1513.

He was appointed High Sheriff of Herefordshire for 1502–03 and 1514–15 and High Sheriff of Shropshire for 1505–06, 1515–16, 1519–20 and 1531–32. He represented Shropshire at the Field of the Cloth of Gold in 1520.

He was a Member (MP) of the Parliament of England for Shropshire in 1529.

He married Anne, the daughter of Sir Richard Corbet of Moreton Corbet; they had two sons and three daughters. Their elder son Edmund Cornwall died age 20 in 1508 and received an elaborate tomb in St Mary's Church, Burford; their younger son Richard became an MP and sheriff. Married 2. Margaret Clifford ISSUES= Laurence Cornell

== Notes ==
Parliament of England
Preceded by Not Known	Member of Parliament for Shropshire; 1529-36; With: John Blount	Succeeded by Richard Trentham; Second member unknown
