= Hamon Peshale =

English politician

Sir Hamon Peshale of Shropshire (died c. 1398) was an English politician. He sat as MP for Shropshire in 1386.

He was knighted c. 1387.

== Family ==
He was the younger brother of Sir Richard and Sir Adam Peshale. c. 1375, he married his first wife, Alice, the daughter and heiress of Sir Robert Harley by Joan, the daughter of Sir Robert Corbet and they had one daughter. Before 1387, he married Thomasina (died by 1405), the daughter and heiress of Sir Thomas Wastneys and the widow of Sir Nicholas Gresley.
