= Richard Lacon =

English politician

Sir Richard Lacon of Lacon and Willey, Shropshire (died c. 1446) was an English politician. He sat as MP for Shropshire in May 1413, November 1414, December 1421, 1423, 1431 and 1433 and Sheriff of Shropshire from 1 December 1415 till 30 November 1416.

He was knighted c. October 1415.

== Political career ==
He also served as Constable of the Earl of Arundel's castle of Oswestry in Shropshire by April 1405; justice of the peace of Shropshire from 12 February 1422 till July 1423; commissioner of inquiry concerning concealments in Shropshire in May 1422, in Shropshire, Staffordshire and Herefordshire in November 1435; commissioner to raise royal loans in Shropshire in March 1431; commissioner of arrest in February 1433; commissioner to distribute tax allowances in December 1433; commissioner to administer the oath against maintenance in January 1434; and escheator of Shropshire and the adjacent march from 4 November 1428 till 12 February 1430.

== Family ==
He was the son of William Lacon (died 1397) by Margaret, the daughter of Ralph Passelewe of Drayton Parslow, Buckinghamshire. Between February 1406 and May 1411, he married his first wife Elizabeth, the daughter of Sir Hamon Peshale by his first wife (the widow of Henry Grendon) and they had five sons and one daughter. After 1435, he married a woman called Agnes.
