= Thomas Vernon (Shropshire MP) =

English politician

Thomas Vernon (by 1532 – 4 June 1556) was an English politician.

He was the second son of Thomas Vernon of Stokesay, Shropshire by Anne, daughter and co-heiress of Sir John Ludlow of Stokesay.

Thomas Vernon was a member of the parliament of England for Shropshire in March 1553. He married Dorothy, daughter of Sir Francis Lovell of Barton Bendish and East Harling, Norfolk. Dorothy's brother was Sir Thomas Lovell, who was also a Member of Parliament.
