= William Burley (politician) =

English politician (died 1458)

William Burley (died 10 August 1458) was MP for Shropshire nineteen times and Speaker of the House of Commons of England.

== Life ==
He was the eldest son of John Burley of Broncroft in Corvedale, who was himself six times MP for Shropshire. Sir Simon de Burley was his great-great-uncle.

He served on several commissions and as a JP and escheator for Shropshire. He was appointed High Sheriff of Shropshire for 1426. He served as knight of the shire (MP) for Shropshire 19 times between 1417 and 1455. The last parliament in which he was returned was that which was summoned to meet at Westminster, on 9 July 1455.

He was chosen Speaker of the House, on 19 March 1436, in the place of Sir John Tyrrell, who was compelled by illness to retire from the chair. In the following parliament William Tresham was elected speaker; however, on 26 February 1444 Burley was again voted to the chair, and continued to preside over the house until the dissolution of that parliament.

== Family ==
He married twice; firstly Ellen, daughter and coheiress of John Grendon, and widow of John Brown of Lichfield; they had two daughters and secondly Margaret, presumed daughter of Thomas Parys of Ludlow he had one daughter with his second wife called Sibilla. He died intestate, leaving as his heirs his daughter Joan, married to the jurist, Sir Thomas Littleton of Teddesley, and his grandson, William Trussell, son of his other daughter, Elizabeth.

== Notes ==
Attribution

- This article incorporates text from a publication now in the public domain: Barker, George Fisher Russell (1886). "Burley, William". In Stephen, Leslie (ed.). Dictionary of National Biography. Vol. 7. London: Smith, Elder & Co. p. 376.

Political offices
Preceded by Sir John Tyrell	Speaker of the House of Commons; 1437	Succeeded by William Tresham
Preceded by William Tresham	Speaker of the House of Commons; 1445	Succeeded by William Tresham
