= Adam Peshale =

English politician

Sir Adam Peshale (died 26 October 1419) was an English politician. He sat as MP for Shropshire in 1373, Staffordshire in January 1377, November 1380, 1381, February 1383, Shropshire in 1394, 1402 and 1411.

He was knighted by November 1380.

== Political career ==
He also served as Sheriff of Staffordshire from 14 November till 8 December 1480, Shropshire from 3 November 1397 till 30 September 1399, and 4 November 1418 till his death.

He also served as commissioner to put down rebellion in Staffordshire in March 1382; commissioner of inquiry concerning murder in February 1383, in Shropshire concerning murder in October 1398, concerning Lollards in January 1414; commissioner of array in Staffordshire in April 1385 and March 1392, in Shropshire in December 1399 and Septembner 1403; commissioner to make proclamation of Henry IV's intention to govern well in Warwickshire in May 1402; commissioner to supervise musters in Shropshire in August 1402; commissioner of oyer and terminer in February 1403; commissioner to raise royal loans in Staffordshire, Shropshire and Herefordshire in 1410; commissioner of arrest in Staffordshire in August and December 1411.

He also served as keeper of the forests of Morfe and Shirlet in Shropshire from 27 November 1384 till March 1396, of Dawley Castle from 24 April till c. September 1399; justice of the peace of Shropshire from 22 July till November 1397; tax collector of Shropshire in March 1404; and tax controller of Warwickshire in March 1404.

== Family ==
He was the younger son of Adam Peshale by Joan, the daughter and heiress of John Etyton. He was the brother of Sir Richard and Sir Hamon Peshale. c. 1362, he married Elizabeth (died c. 1366), the daughter and co-heiress of Sir John Weston and widow of Sir John Whiston and they possibly had one child whom predeceased him. In September/October 1369, he married his second wife, Elizabeth (c. 1339–1384), the daughter and eventual heiress of Sir Philip ap Rees and widow of Sir Henry Mortimer and they had one child whom predeceased him. By May 1389, he was married to Joyce (died 12 August 1420), the daughter and eventual co-heiress of John Botetourt, 2nd Lord Botetourt and widow of Sir Baldwin Freville and they had two daughters.
