= George Blount (died 1581) =

English politician

Sir George Blount (1512/13 – 1581) was an English politician.

He was born the son of John Blount of Kinlet, Shropshire. He succeeded his father in 1531 and was knighted in 1544.

He was a Member (MP) of the Parliament of England for Shropshire in 1545, 1547 and 1571; for Bridgnorth in October 1553 and 1559; for Much Wenlock in November 1554, 1555, 1558, 1563 and 1572.

He was appointed High Sheriff of Staffordshire for 1552–3, 1572–3 and High Sheriff of Shropshire for 1563–4.
