= John Corbet (by 1500 – 1555 or later) =

English politician

John Corbet (born 1500 – death 1555 or later) was an English member of parliament.

He was the son of Thomas Corbet of Leigh, Shropshire.

He was appointed to the Shropshire bench as a justice of the peace from 1521 to 1554 or later, Constable of Caus Castle by 1528 and High Sheriff of Shropshire from January to November 1526 and for 1536–37. He was elected MP to the Parliament of England for Shropshire in 1539.

He married three times: firstly Margaret, daughter of Sir Thomas Blount of Kinlet with whom he had one son; secondly Joyce or Joan, the daughter of John Pakington, who gave him a further two sons and thirdly Agnes, the daughter of William Booth of Dunham, Cheshire, who delivered him another two sons and three daughters.
