= Thomas Lovell (died 1567) =

English politician

Sir Thomas Lovell (by 1528 – 23 March 1567) was an English politician.

He was the firstborn son of Sir Francis Lovell of Barton Bendish and East Harling, Norfolk, by Anne, daughter of George Ashby of Hertfordshire. He was elected a Member of the Parliament of England for Midhurst in October 1553. His sister Dorothy was married to Thomas Vernon, also a Member of Parliament.
