= Richard Fermor =

English merchant (died 1551)

- Died: 1551

Arms of Fermor: Argent, a fess sable between three lion's heads erased gules

Richard Fermor (1480x84–1551), was an English wool merchant. His father, Thomas Fermor, was also a wool merchant in Witney, Oxfordshire. By 1505 Richard was a merchant of the staple at Calais.

In 1509, he was one of the jurors who convicted Richard Empson and he benefited financially from Empson's fall by buying the manor of Easton Neston. From 1520 to 1523, Fermor was the warden of the Grocers' Company. In 1540, Fermor was found guilty of misprision of treason and on 9 May 1540 he was sentenced to life imprisonment in the Marshalsea Prison and attainted. In 1541, he was pardoned. An extensive inventory of Richard Fermor's household goods at Easton Neston survives in the Cotton manuscripts.

He married Anna Browne, daughter of Sir William Browne the elder, Lord Mayor of London. They had five sons, Sir John Fermor, Sir Thomas Fermor, Sir Jerome Fermor and two other sons whose names are not known, as well as five daughters, including Mary (1534–1573).

Richard Fermor died in 1551 or 1552. His heir was Sir John Fermor (d. 1571) who married Maud Vaux (d. 1579), a daughter of Nicholas Vaux, 1st Baron Vaux of Harrowden. Their eldest surviving son was George Fermor (d. 1612).
