= Thomas Fermor =

16th-century English politician

Arms of Fermor: Argent, a fess sable between three lion's heads erased gules

Thomas Fermor (by 1523–1580) was an English politician who was a Member of Parliament and High Sheriff of Shropshire from 1558 to 1559.

== Life ==
Fermor was born a younger son of merchant Richard Fermor and was the brother-in-law of John Mordaunt, 2nd Baron Mordaunt.

He became a merchant of the staple and a member of the Grocer's Company. From his wife he acquired an estate in Shropshire and on the death of his uncle William Fermor an estate in Oxfordshire.

Fermor was elected a Member (MP) of the Parliament of England for Brackley in October 1553 and for Shropshire in 1558. He was appointed High Sheriff of Shropshire for 1558–59 and made Recorder of Bridgnorth from 1561 to his death in 1580.

He married twice; firstly Frances the daughter and heiress of Thomas Horde of Horde Park, Bridgnorth and the widow of Edward Raleigh of Farthinghoe, Northamptonshire and secondly Bridget, the daughter of Henry Bradshaw of Halton, Buckinghamshire and the widow of Henry White of South Warnborough, Hampshire, with whom he had at least a son and two daughters.

A 1581 contract made by his executor George Shirley with the sculptors Richard and Gabriel Roiley for his tomb at Somerton includes an alabaster effigy to represent Fermor's wife, "a picture or portraiture of a faire gentlewoman with a Frenchehood, edge and abilliment, with all other apparel, furniture, jewels, ornaments, and things usual decent and seemly for a gentlewoman".
