= William Charlton (died 1567) =

English politician

William Charlton or Chorlton (by 1517–1567) was an English politician.

He was a member (MP) of the parliament of England for Shropshire in April 1554.
