= Edward Acton (MP for Shropshire) =

Member of the Parliament of England

Edward Acton was an English politician who was MP for Shropshire in 1378, October 1382, April 1384, November 1384, 1386, and September 1388. He was High Sheriff of Shropshire, alnager, justice of the peace, and tax collector in the same county, and escheator for that county and also Staffordshire and the adjacent marches.
