= John Blount (died 1531) =

English politician

- Sir John Blount of Kinlet Hall
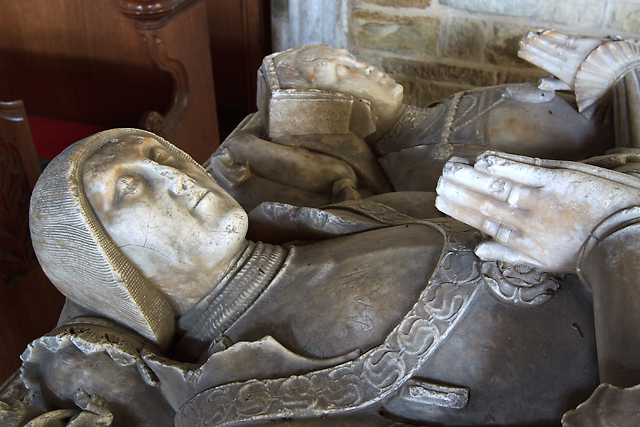
- Tomb of Sir John and Catherine, St John the Baptist church, Kinlet
- Born: c. 1471 or earlier
- Died: 27 February 1531
- Spouse: Catherine (nee Peshall) Blount
- Issue: Elizabeth; Anne Blount; Isabella Blount; Rosa Blount; Agnes Blount; George
- Father: Thomas Blount

Sir John Blount (by 1471 – 27 February 1531) was an English politician. His daughter, Elizabeth, was a Lady-in-Waiting to Consort Queen of England Catherine of Aragon, and later, a mistress to King of England Henry VIII. She bore for Henry VIII his only recognized, illegitimate son, Henry FitzRoy, Duke of Richmond and Somerset. Elizabeth was Henry's mistress beginning in 1514 or 1515, a relationship which continued for about eight years, after the suggestion of an affair was brought to light.

== Early life ==
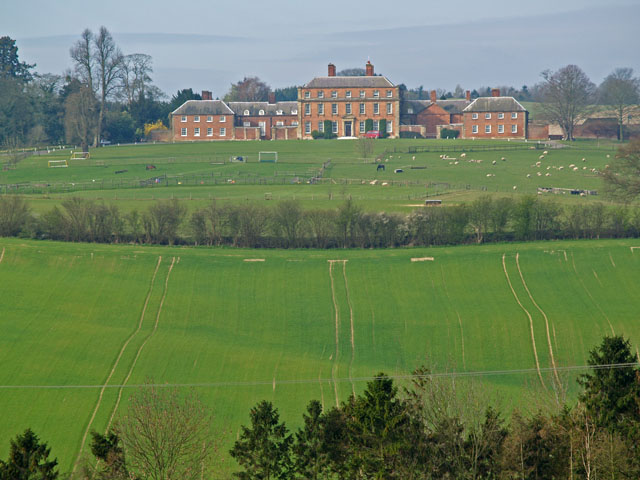
Kinlet Hall, Shropshire

He was born the eldest son of Sir Thomas Blount of Kinlet Hall, Bridgnorth, Shropshire. He married at Kinlet on 1 August 1492, Catherine, the daughter and coheiress of Hugh Peshall of Knightley, Staffordshire, with whom he had three sons and four daughters including Elizabeth and George.

== Career ==
He fought as a captain in the English army besieging Tournai on 16 August 1513. His daughter Elizabeth gave Henry VIII his only recognised, illegitimate son, Henry FitzRoy, born 15 June 1519. Blount later accompanied Henry VIII to France to attend the famous meeting between Henry and Francis I of France at the Field of the Cloth of Gold, 7 to 24 June 1520. He served as a justice of the peace (J.P.) for Staffordshire in 1520–1526. He succeeded to his father's title around 1525. He was appointed High Sheriff of Staffordshire for 1526–27. He again served as a justice of the peace (J.P.), this time for Shropshire, from 1529 to his death. He was elected a member (MP) of the Parliament of England for Shropshire in 1529. Henry VIII knighted him in 1529.

== Death ==
He was also picked High Sheriff of Shropshire for 1530–31 but died in office in on 27 February 1531 and was succeeded by his eldest son George Blount, also to be an MP and High Sheriff. He was buried at Kinlet church, where there is a tomb monument to himself and his wife. It should be noted as part of John Blount's legacy that just five years later Henry FitzRoy died on 23 July 1536 at the age of 17 years without issue, thus ending Blount's bloodline connection to Henry VIII.
