= Robert Harley =

Robert Harley may refer to:

== Politicians ==
- Robert Harley (1579–1656), English statesman, Member of Parliament for Radnor and Herefordshire
- Robert Harley (died 1673) (1626–1673), English Member of Parliament for Radnor
- Robert Harley, 1st Earl of Oxford and Earl Mortimer (1661–1724), Member of Parliament for Radnor and Tregony
- Robert Harley (c. 1706 – 1774), Member of Parliament for Leominster, 1731–1741 and 1742–1747, and Droitwich
- Robert William Harley (1829–1892), British colonial administrator

== Others ==
- Robert Harley (mathematician) (1828–1910), English Congregational minister
- Robert Harley (writer), British comedy writer
- Bob Harley (1888–1958), Canadian soccer player
- Rob Harley (born 1990), Scottish rugby union player
