= Mainprise =

English criminal law concept similar to bail

Mainprise is a concept in English law regarding releasing a prisoner from custody upon sureties pending trial. It is nearly identical to the idea of bail and has been absorbed into the laws regulating bail in many jurisdictions. When they were distinguished, bail was not restricted in the type of surety upon which a prisoner could be released, while mainprise always involved a specified sum of money. A prisoner released on bail was still technically in custody and could be re-seized, while one delivered on mainprise was no longer in custody and could not have suits brought against him as though he were.
