= John Rocke =

English banker and an amateur ornithologist (1817 - 1881)

- Born: 1817-06-10
- Died: 1881-04-02
- Occupation(s): Banker, amateur ornithologist
- Known for: collection of stuffed birds

John Rocke (1817–1881) was an English banker and an amateur ornithologist. He was said to have one of the most important collections of stuffed birds in England, around 1860.

== Biography ==
John Rocke was born 10 June 1817. His mother was Ann Beale (1791–1857), the youngest daughter of Thomas Beale (1747–1800). His father was the Reverend John Rocke (1783–1849), rector of Clungunford. His grandfather was again a Rev. John Rocke (1755–1824; vicar of Wellington and mayor of Shrewsbury). His father was an enthusiastic amateur geologist, who sent in 1813 fossils from Shropshire to Arthur Aikin and the Geological Society of London via Thomas Dugard. Later he assisted Roderick Murchison with his research on the Silurian.

John Rocke was educated at Harrow School and next at Trinity College, Cambridge. He became a banker in the family business Rocke, Eyton & Co.

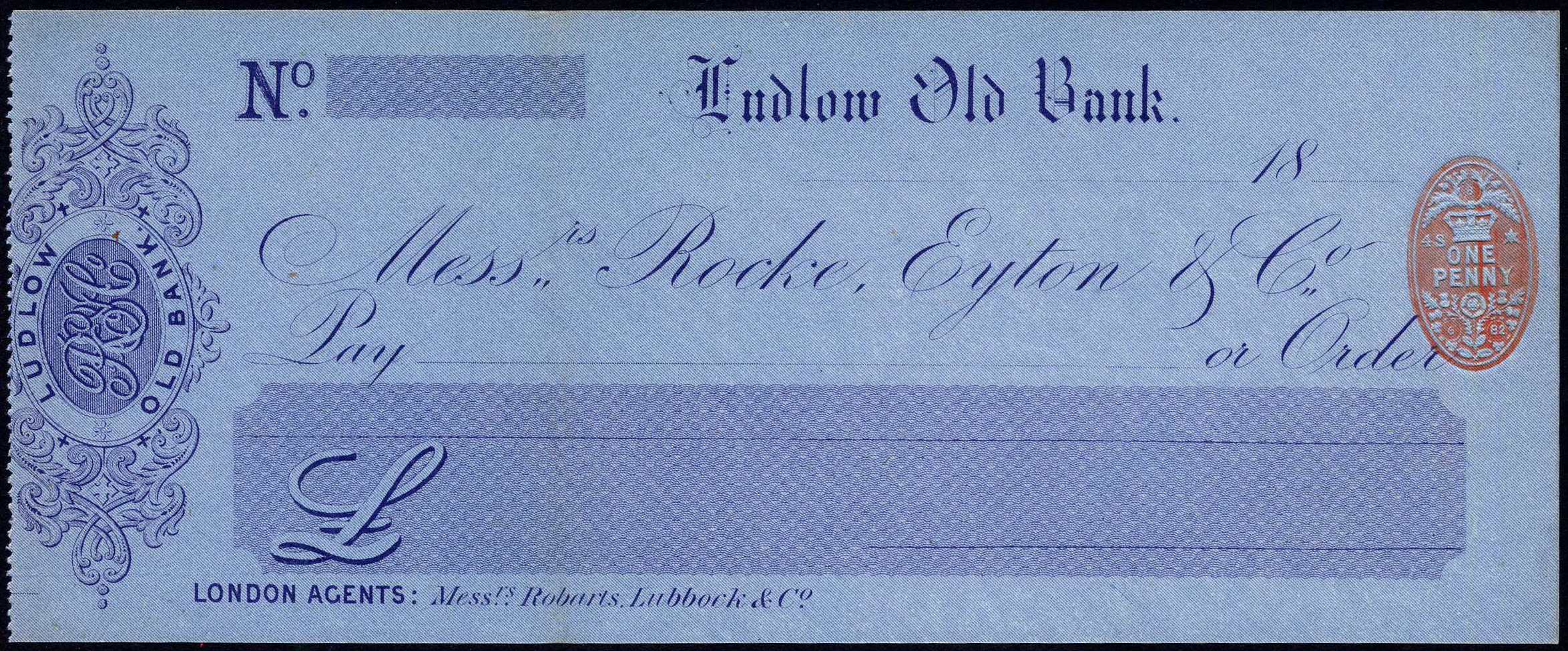
(Unused) cheque of Rocke, Eyton & Co.

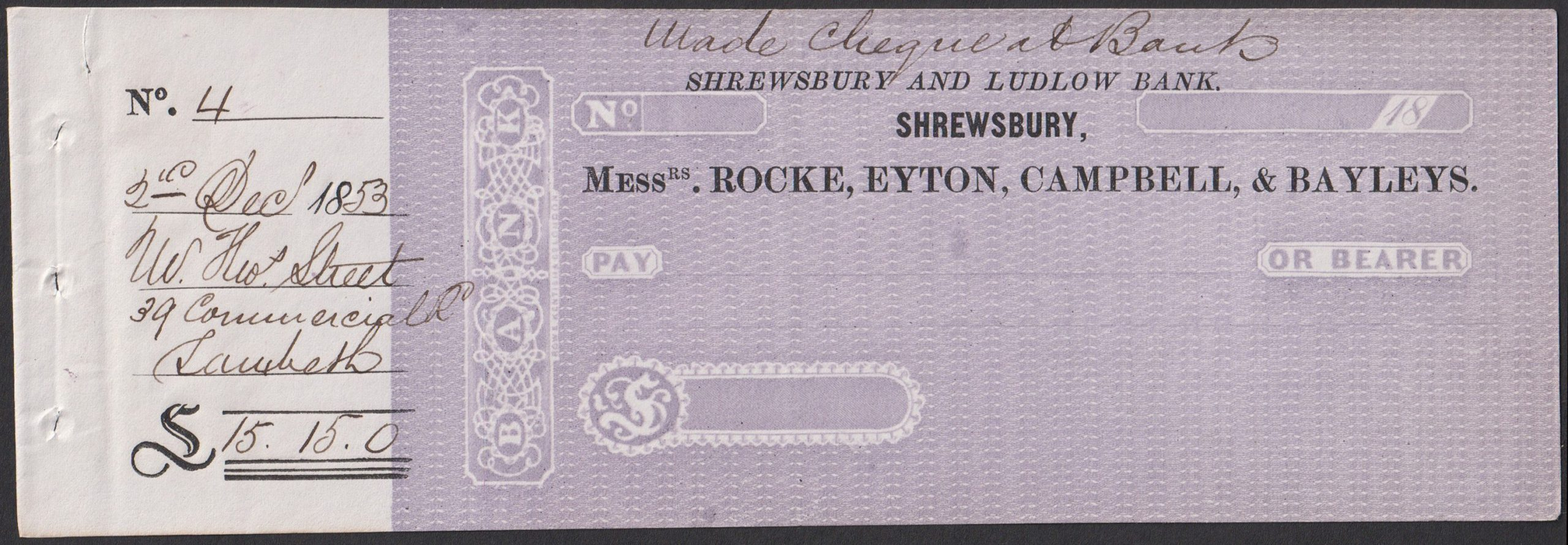
Cheque of Rocke, Eyton, Campbell & Bayley

Rocke, Eyton & Co. had been formed in 1792, and resided in Shrewsbury under the name "Shrewsbury Old Bank". In 1884 it amalgamated with Burton, Lloyd, Salt & How, to form Eyton, Burton & Co. The bank was founded by the grandfather of John, the rev. John Rocke (1755–1824) and his brother in law Thomas Eyton. The bank was then named the Old Shrewsbury Bank.

The bank operated under a lot of different names: Ludlow Old Bank (see the image), Shrewsbury and Ludlow Bank (ibid), Eyton, Reynolds & Bishop, Rocke, Eyton & Campbell, Rocke, Eyton, Loxdale, Campbell & Bayley, Rocke, Eyton, Campbell & Bayleys and Salop Old Bank.

John Rocke was a lieutenant in the South Shropshire (also "South Salop") Yeoman Cavalry and became a Justice of the peace (J.P.) and a Deputy Lieutenant (D.L.) and was a High Sheriff of Shropshire in 1869.

In 1849, upon the death of his father he inherited the house and manor of Clungunford. The house was built in 1825, and was designed by Edward Haycock Sr.

In 1853 he married Constance Anne Cuyler (1830–1909), daughter of Catherine Frances Hallifax (1805–1877) and sir Charles Cuyler Bart (1794–1862).

Anne and John Rocke had a son, John Charles Leveson Rocke (1855–1906), who was a musician.

John Rocke died at the age of sixty-three at 3 April 1881.

== Naturalist ==
John Rocke was a passionate and knowledgeable naturalist, who collected a large number of stuffed birds (and eggs). It was said to contain every British species and is described as being of international note. For this collection he added a top-lit wing to Clungunford House. Around 1860 the collection was regarded as "the finest, most complete, collection of British birds in the country".

The most famous bird species in the collection was a now extinct great auk (Pinguinus impennis). It was bought by Rocke in 1860.

In his "magnificent" book The Great Auk (1999) Errol Fuller gives an extensive listing of all remaining stuffed great Auks and of all remaining eggs. The Clungunford Auk is numbered 4 and is described in detail (with several images). The egg has its own paragraph (nr. 47) and images.

After the death of John Rocke the stuffed great auk was acquired by the Rowland Ward company, London. Via the collector Vivian Hewitt (who paid £700 for it), it turned into the collection of the Thinktank, Birmingham Science Museum (at a price of £9.000). The so-called "Clungunford Auk" was painted by the Shropshire artist Jonathan Adams in 2012. The painting is now in Clungunford House. In Rocke's collection was also an egg of the great auk, that is now in the collection of the Alexander Koenig Research Museum in Bonn, Germany.

Some of the birds Rocke collected are now in the collection of the Ludlow Museum.

The collection of birds was described in a (handwritten) catalogue, that was discovered by the then owner of Clungunford House in the 1960s.

in 1863 he was an "Associate" of the British Archaeological Association

In 1865 and 1866 he published his 'Ornithological Notes from Shropshire,' in 4 parts in The Zoologist.

Later, Rocke published several short notes in The Zoologist, in different volumes, for instance in 1875, 1876 and 1877.

Rocke was a member of the Leintwardine Fishing Club.

== Sources ==
- Burke, Bernard (1914). A History of the Landed Gentry of Great Britain (12th ed.). London: Harrison & Sons. p. 1616.
- Fuller, Errol (1999). The Great Auk. Southborough, Kent: Errol Fuller. ISBN 0-9533553-0-6.
- Williams, Gareth (2021). "66. Clungunford House". The Country Houses of Shropshire. Cambridge: Cambridge University Press. pp. 177–178. doi:10.1017/9781800103474. ISBN 9781800103474. (page 178 holds an (undated) image of the House, with on the right side the part of the building with a roof lantern, that contained the collection of stuffed birds).
