= William Gatacre (MP) =

16th-century English politician

William Gatacre (by 1499 – 22 December 1577) was an English politician.

He was a member (MP) of the parliament of England for Shropshire in November 1554.
