= Abbots of Shrewsbury =

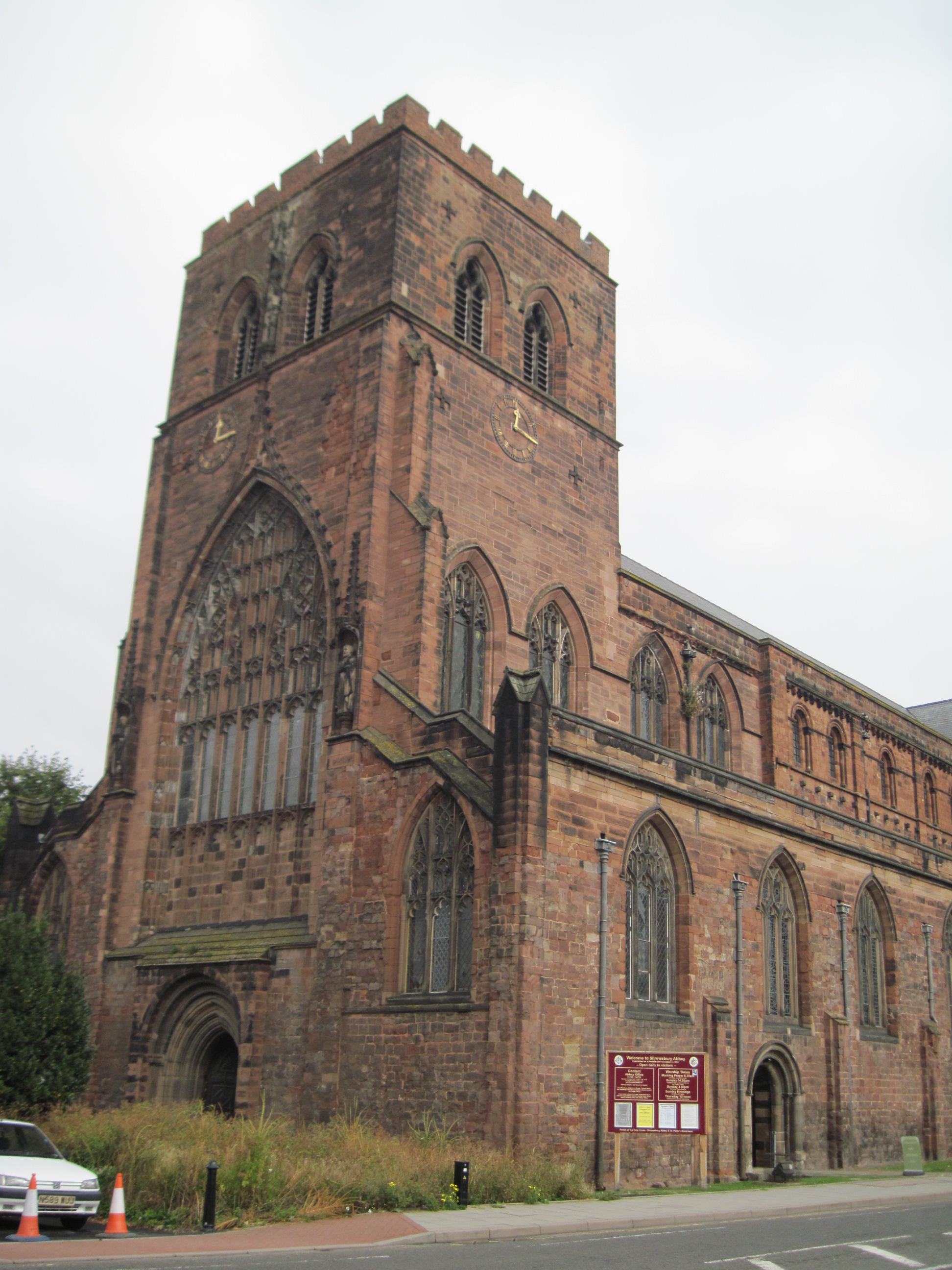
Shrewsbury Abbey today.

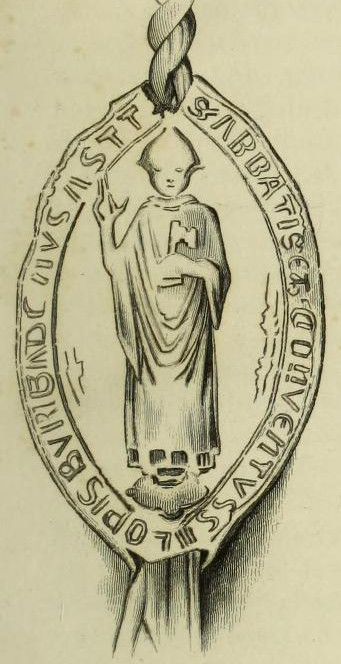
Seal of Shrewsbury Abbey, 1539, showing a mitred abbot holding the Keys of Peter, symbol of the abbey's patron saint.

The recorded abbots of Shrewsbury run from c 1087, four years after Shrewsbury Abbey's foundation, to 1540, its dissolution under Thomas Cromwell. The abbey was large and well-endowed and the abbots were often important political figures as well as ecclesiastical leaders. They varied greatly over the centuries in ethnic and social origins, intellectual attainments and holiness of life. The first two, Fulchred and Godfred, were imported from Normandy. The remainder seem to have been born in Britain and most, but not all, were elected, or at least selected, from the chapter of the abbey. As important territorial magnates, the abbots were always called to take part in the sessions of the Parliament of England from its very beginnings as an institution in 1265. As important figures in the Western Catholic Church, abbots were permitted by the Pope to wear the pontifical ring from 1251 and the mitre from 1397.

== Dates and procedures ==
For the earlier abbots, dating and detail are uncertain as most of the evidence comes from chroniclers, whose focus generally lay elsewhere, although Orderic Vitalis was close to events in the first few decades. Any chronicles of the abbey itself are lost. It is impossible to be sure that any listing of abbots is complete. From the reign of Henry III of England key dates become easier, as the abbey was under royal patronage and the published Patent Rolls record key events in the succession of abbots. These are:

- Licence to elect a new abbot. This could only be issued after the previous abbot had died and been buried or had formally resigned in a letter to the local bishop. Licences were issued in response to a petition from the monks of the abbey. For example, when John de Drayton died in 1292, two monks had to travel to Northumberland to petition the king and they obtained a licence on 27 May. They then had to get take this back to Shrewsbury before the chapter could be gathered and an election held.
- Notification of royal assent to the election of an abbot. This was sent to the diocesan bishop so that he could arrange to confirm and consecrate the abbot. For example, when William of Muckley was elected as successor to John of Drayton the news had to be taken all the way back to the Scottish border, where the king notified his assent on 20 June 1292. The notification then had to be taken back to the bishop of Coventry and Lichfield, wherever he might be, so that he could arrange the consecration. If available, he would do this in person.
- Mandates to restore the temporalities. The abbey's assets fell into the king's hands during a vacancy and were normally exploited through the county or regional escheator, who paid the king for the farm of the revenues, and might sub-let them. The lands and privileges of the abbey were restored only after the king was informed by the bishop that the abbot had been confirmed. As the abbey acquired lands in several counties, there might need to be a mandate for each of them. The mandates could only be issued when the king heard from the bishop that the abbot had been duly consecrated. As the king was still conducting operations against the Scots, it is not surprising that it took until 2 July for the king to hear from the bishop and to issue the mandate to restore temporalities to William of Muckley, and presumably much longer for the escheator and tenants to hear of it and take action. As examples below will demonstrate, the mandate could be deliberately delayed, on a variety of excuses, to prolong lay exploitation of the abbey's substantial estates.
- The writ de intendendo. Generally issued with the mandate to restore temporalities, this informed the abbey's many tenants that they had a new landlord, who was a tenant-in-chief of the king and that they should show due obedience to him.

These events only give clues to the dates of abbots' successions, although they are generally helpful. Actual election dates, and the dates of deaths and resignations, are sometimes in the records of the Diocese of Lichfield, but these are far less full than the royal records in the Patent Rolls. There was an obvious temptation for kings in need of money to prolong the process at any point in order to milk the abbey's resources, as Henry VII seems to have done.

== Fulchred c. 1087 – c. 1115/9 ==
Shrewsbury Abbey was founded in 1083 by Roger de Montgomery, on the instance of Ordelirius, one of his clerks, and using the site of St Peter's church, which Roger had previously granted to Ordelirius. The founding colony consisted of two monks brought from St Martin's Abbey in Séez, southern Normandy: these were Reginald and Frodo. The first abbot, Fulchred (Foucher in modern French), is not mentioned as present before the organised conventual life of the abbey was inaugurated. This was probably late in 1087, as Orderic Vitalis, son of Ordelirius the clerk, and very likely an eye-witness of the events, attests that this was in the reign of William Rufus. Orderic describes Fulchred as "eloquent" and quotes at length an important specimen of his oratory. A monk of Gloucester Abbey had vision, in which a divine prediction of the imminent death of William Rufus was delivered. Abbot Serlo wrote to the king, informing him of the vision. On the Feast of St. Peter ad Vincula, 1 August 1100, Fulchred was a guest preacher at Gloucester and mounted the pulpit to deliver a diatribe against the state of the country under Rufus.

| Latin | English |
|---|---|
| Anglia prophanis ad conculcationem datur in hereditate quia repleta est terra iniquitate. Totum corpus maculatur multiformis lepra nequitiae, et a capite usque ad pedes occupavit illud languor malitiae, Effrenis enim superbia ubique volitat, et omnia, si dici fas est, etiam stellas coeli conculcat. Discincta libido vasa fictilia, sed et aurea coinquinat, et insatiabilis avaritia quaeque potest devorat. En subitanea rerum instabit immutatio. Non diu dominabuntur effeminati. Dominus Deus publicos sponsae sum hostes judicare veniet, Moab et Edom rumfea manifestae ultionis percutiet, et terribili commotione montes Gelboe subivertet. Ira Dei transgressoribus ultra non parcet. Iam coelestis ultio super filios infidelitatis desaeviet. Ecce arcus superni furoris contra reprobos intensus est, et sagitta velox ad vulnerandum de pharetra extracta est. Repente iam feriet, seseque corrigendo sapiens omnis ictum declinet. | England is allowed to become a heritage trodden under foot by the profane, because the land is full of iniquity. Its whole body is spotted by the leprosy of a universal iniquity, and infected by the disease of sin from the crown of the head to the sole of the feet. Unbridled pride stalks abroad, swelling, if I may say it, even above the stars of heaven. Dissolute lust pollutes not only vessels of clay, but those of gold, and insatiable avarice devours all it can lay hands on. But lo! a sudden change of affairs is threatened. The libertines shall not always bear rule, the Lord God will come to judgment of the open enemies of his spouse, and strike Moab and Edom with the sword of his signal vengeance, and overthrow the mountains of Gilboa with a fearful convulsion. The anger of the Lord shall no longer spare transgressors, and the wrath of heaven shall rage against the unbelieving children. The bow of divine vengeance is bent on the reprobate, and the swift arrow taken from the quiver is ready to wound. The blow will soon be struck, but the man who is wise enough to correct his sins will avoid the infliction. |

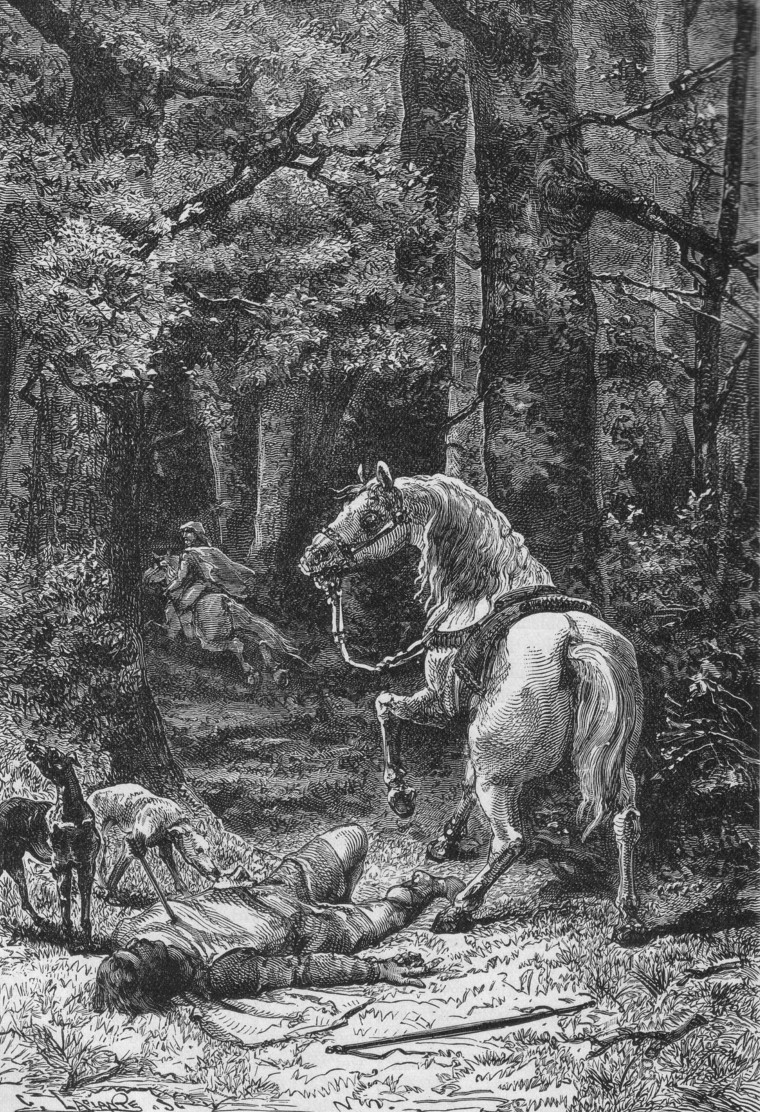
19th century depiction of the death of William Rufus.

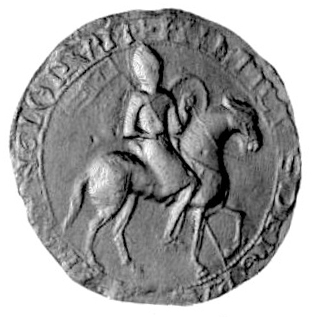
Seal of Henry I, depicting him on horseback.

The king was killed while hunting in the New Forest the very next day, creating an impression of Fulchred's prophetic insight and power.

The succession of the new king Henry I was accompanied by a period of turbulence and the revolt of Earl Roger's son, Robert of Bellême, in 1102 resulted in his expropriation, leaving the abbey without the powerful local protection it had enjoyed. The king himself became patron and he was fairly slow to vindicate the abbey in disputes, except when near the scene. He did, for example confirm Robert's gift of land at Baschurch to Fulchred, probably while the campaign against Robert in Shropshire and Staffordshire was still going on. However, when he was away, the children of donors tried to evade their obligations. For example, Siward the Fat, the original Anglo-Saxon founder of St Peter's church at Shrewsbury, had given up any claims he might have to the abbey site in return for a life-time grant from Earl Roger of the estate of Langafeld, now Cheney Longville This should have passed to the abbey on his death but Fulchred had to pay Siward's son, Aldred, £15 before he would hand over the estate. Fulchred seems to have devoted much of his energy in his later years to this piecemeal defence of the abbey's endowments. The king vindicated Fulchred in a dispute with royal forest officials and also wrote to Richard de Belmeis I, his viceroy in the Welsh Marches and the lesser officials and barons of the region to make clear that the abbey was free of all customs, as in the days of Earl Roger and of his sons, Earl Hugh and Robert of Bellême.

John Stow in the 16th century recorded that Fulchred was a son of the Earl Roger, although his authority for this is not known. The date of Fulchred's death is very uncertain. Some, following Browne Willis, place it as early as 1113, while others favour a date as late as 1119.

== Godfred or Godfrey c 1115/9 - 1128 ==
Godfred, also from Séez, had a reputation as a learned man and preacher.

Henry I granted, during Godfred's abbacy, the Sanctum Prisca writ, of 1121, which confirmed the abbey's rights and possessions, as held under Fulchred, and awarded it multure or mill-right, the fees charged by mill owners for grinding corn, in Shrewsbury. This implied a monopoly over milling, as no-one was allowed to build a mill or a fishery at the two bridges over the River Severn except the abbey or its agents. This reinforced the earlier grant of mills by Earl Roger. Richard de Capella, the Bishop of Hereford, whose diocese included a large part of southern Shropshire, was warned not to let the king hear complaints against him over his dealings with Shrewsbury Abbey. Under Godfred the abbey also began to increase its estates again, receiving mainly gifts of land from small Shropshire landowners, although there were substantial grants from Earl Roger's son Roger the Poitevin and his associates, some of them in Cheshire and Lancashire.

Ordericus summarised the abbacies of Fulchred and his successor, Godfred, thus:

| Latin | English |
|---|---|
| Ambo litterati et religiosi pastores fuerunt, et fere XL annis Dominicum gregem diligenter educare studuerunt. Ingenti cura res novi monasterii exterius auxerunt, et instituta morum ad salutem animarum interius discipulis laudabiliter sanxerunt. | Both were pious and learned pastors, who for nearly forty years carefully nurtured the Lord's flock. Under their superintendence the external affairs of the new monastery became prosperous, and they established within an excellent discipline among their disciples for the good of their souls. |

Godfred died on 22 March 1128, suddenly, "worn out by age."

== Herbert (1128-1138) ==
After Robert of Bellême was dispossessed the Crown became patron of the abbey but it is not clear what part it played in most of the appointments of abbots, including the controversial election of Herbert. Orderic wrote that: Herbertus gubernaculum rudis abbatiae usurpavit. Owen and Blakeway in their 1825 history translated this as stating that Herbert "usurped the rudder of the infant establishment" but pointed out that Orderic "may have employed usurpo in a good sense, and that he did so is nearly certain from the fact that Herbert received benediction (i.e. consecration) from William archbishop of Canterbury." While the word "usurp" lacks a good sense in contemporary English, usurpare can have the sense of wrongful possession but may imply no more than "to take on or assume." Thomas Forester, a 19th-century translator of Orderic, rendered the key phrase: "took the government of this rising community." Despite his consecration by Archbishop William de Corbeil and confirmation in possession of the abbey lands by King Stephen, Herbert was to be removed by a legatine council. However, it is not known if the circumstances of his entry into the abbacy had any bearing on his removal.

It was Herbert who, "by advice of his brethren" (consilio fratrum suum) sent his prior, Robert of Shrewsbury, to seek the relics of St Winifred, a decision which was to have momentous consequences for the economic as well as the spiritual development of the abbey.

== Ranulph I (Ralph) (1138-1148) ==
Ranulph was installed as abbot in Herbert's place on the decision of the legatine council. His name occurs up to 1147. It is possible he adopted a less collegial approach to leadership, as he is known to have given away two thirds of the tithes of Emstrey parish to Atcham church, without the consent of his convent.

== Robert of Shrewsbury (c.1148-1168) ==
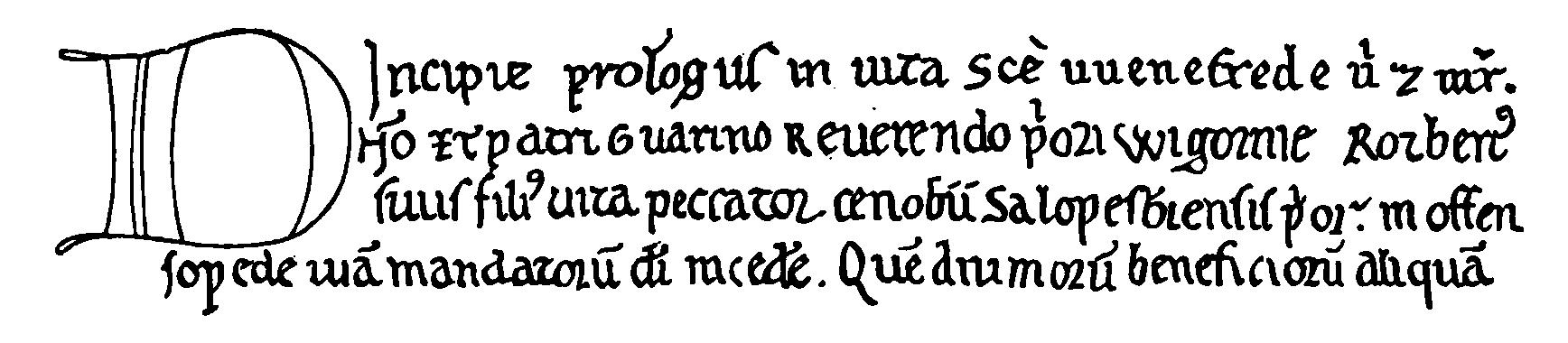
Part of the prologue of a life of St Winifred by Robert of Shrewsbury, Bodleian Mss. Laud c.94.

Robert of Shrewsbury is thought to have been a member of the Pennant family of Downing, a few miles from Holywell, the main shrine of Saint Winifred. He was prior of the abbey for at least two decades before he was elected abbot. He took charge of the mission that succeeded in translating the relics of St Winifred from Gwytherin to Shrewsbury Abbey. He recorded the venture as part of the life of the saint, which he wrote shortly afterwards. This is the only known work written by a monk of Shrewsbury. It is dedicated to Domino et patri Guarino reverendo priori Wigornie: Master and father Warin, the reverend prior at Worcester. This suggests that Robert had studied under Warin.

Robert is now thought to have become abbot around 1148. His only major known achievement in office was the recovery of the Emstrey tithes: King Stephen directed their restitution to Shrewsbury. By this time the importance of the issue had risen, as Atcham church had fallen under the patronage of Lilleshall Abbey, which was later allowed to appropriate it: Lilleshall was a major rival to Shrewsbury.

Earlier authorities gave Robert's year of death as 1167 but 1168 is now generally accepted, as it is the year given in the Annals of Tewkesbury Abbey. It seems likely he died and was buried at Shrewsbury Abbey.

== Adam I (1168-1175) ==
Adam seems to have been preoccupied by the need to build up the abbey's collection of relics. He is known to have visited Canterbury for this purpose. It was probably he who brought back an entire rochet of Thomas Becket, as well as part of another which was stained with his blood, a cloth stained with his blood and brains, and various other items of his clothing, including his hair shirt, collar, girdle, cowl, shirt and glove. A document prepared in the reign of Henry II gives a full list of the abbey's relics. Adam was deposed in 1175.

== Ranulph II (1175 – 1186–1190) ==
Ranulph (or Ralph, Radulph) was one of three monks from Canterbury Cathedral's Benedictine chapter who were appointed to abbacies immediately after the accession of Archbishop Richard of Dover, all apparently under his influence. He is last recorded alive in 1186, and was dead by 1190.

== Hugh De Lacy (1189–1190 – 1215–1218) ==
Hugh was abbot by 1190 when dealt with the disputed timber rights of woods in the Wrekin, with the Prior of Wenlock. He may have been a member of the landowning de Lacy family. In c. 1213 he assigned rents from Abbey property in Shrewsbury, Baschurch and the Clee Hills to buy food for his obit, also on the same day a rye dole from Baschurch, for the poor. He died or was deposed between c. 1215 and c. 1218.

== Ranulph III (c. 1215 – 1218) ==
Ranulph, or Ralph is said to have died in post in 1218.

== William Langton (c. 1218 – 1221) ==
William may be a relative of Stephen Langton, then Archbishop of Canterbury who granted a letter of protections against trespassers to the abbey. William was dead by 5 July 1221.

== Walter (1221–1223) ==
Walter had been prior of Leominster Priory before he was elected abbot at Shrewsbury. The king assented to his election and restored the temporalities to him some time in 1221.

== Henry (1223–1244) ==
Henry was prior of Shrewsbury Abbey before election as abbot. He was elected after 24 August 1223, as that was the date on which a vacancy was noted in the Diocese of Coventry and Lichfield on the death of Bishop William de Cornhill: With the Archbishop of Canterbury otherwise engaged, the Archbishop of York, Walter de Gray, was asked to consecrate Henry as abbot.

In Hilary Term of 1227 Henry was summoned to court to defend the abbey in a suit over pasture rights at various villages in Shropshire. Two years later, he was one of the Shropshire magnates charged with conducting Dafydd, son of Llywelyn the Great, to London to give his homage to the king. Archbishop Edmund Rich visited the abbey in 1234 and commended the "religious and decorous" conduct of the abbot and convent. The precise date of his death is unknown but, because of the vacancy it caused, Henry III exercised his right to present a cleric to the abbey's church at Hodnet on 4 August 1244.

== Adam II (1244–1250) ==
Adam's abbacy is notable mainly for a papal bull the abbey obtained in 1246, setting out a long list of grievances it had against Lilleshall Abbey and various others, including clerics of its own Diocese of Lichfield and of the Diocese of Hereford. The pope, Innocent IV, authorised the Dean of Lichfield and the Precentor to hold a meeting to settle matters. Adam resigned the abbacy in 1250 and Henry III, then at Westminster, authorised an election on 2 May.

== Adam III (1250) ==
Adam was the sacristan of the abbey, as well as chaplain to the Cardinal Priest of San Lorenzo in Lucina, when the monks of Shrewsbury elected him their abbot. The king assented to his election while the court was at Chertsey on 21 May 1250 and mandated Roger Weseham, the Bishop of Coventry and Lichfield, to consecrate him. Bishop Roger refused to confirm him as abbot and he appealed to the Pope. However, he seems to have voluntarily given up his claim to the abbacy.

== William (1250–1251) ==
Adam was set aside by Bishop Roger, whose preferred candidate was William, the sub-prior of St. Mary's Priory and Cathedral at Coventry. The king was at Bristol when he gave his assent to William's "election" as abbot of Shrewsbury on 19 August 1250. A week later, now at Berkeley Castle, he mandated the abbey's tenants to accept William as their lord. The Pope began to enquire into the affair and summoned William's proctor to argue his case. By 22 October, back at Westminster, the king was hearing of trouble breaking out at the abbey itself and appointed Robert Walerand, one of his most trusted justiciars, to deal with cases arising from a serious trespass. The king had simply responded to the ecclesiastical initiatives that came his way. Nevertheless, the chronicler of Tewkesbury Abbey, another major Benedictine house, accused him of intruding William into Shrewsbury Abbey. After this point abbots were always elected from within the Shrewsbury convent itself.

== Henry (1251–1258) ==
In March 1251, the Pope, then resident in Lyon, provided Henry, a monk from Evesham Abbey, as a replacement for William, annulling what the bishop had done. William was commanded to keep silent on the matter and to hand over to Henry the abbey and the income he had received. The abbot of Evesham was told to protect Henry in the interim. A month after his appointment Henry was also granted the privilege of wearing the pontifical ring. On 5 May the king notified the abbey tenants that Henry was their new lord.

In October 1253 the crown prosecutor accused Henry of ejecting the king's priest from the chapel of Fitz and installing Robert de Acton in his place. Henry's men were further accused of breaking into the chapel and stealing some jewels. Henry denied the allegations and claimed he had acted under mandate of Master Hugh de St Edmund, who had jurisdiction over the Crucesignati (crusaders). Acton became a fugitive and the sheriff of Shropshire confiscated his lands until the following year when Acton resigned Fitz and agreed to pay compensation for the stolen property. However the question of whether the king or the abbot of Shrewsbury had the right to present the priest to Fitz was not settled. The matter was ultimately decided in a trial by combat in 1256, the abbot's champion being victorious.

In the summer of 1257 Henry III gave protection, then safe conduct, to the abbot of Shrewsbury, who must have been Abbot Henry, to act as ambassador to Alfonso X of Castile, an ally who was nevertheless a rival of the king's brother, Richard, 1st Earl of Cornwall, to become Holy Roman Emperor. During Henry's absence abroad he and his men were accused of burning the house of Thorstan Perponte in Wylegrave (in Warrington, Lancashire) and charged with arson.

Henry had died by Christmas 1258 because, on 26 December that year the king acknowledged that the abbey had licence to hold an election. The abbey's prior and sacristan had been deputed to present the monks' choice to the king: he duly gave his assent and requested confirmation by the bishop.

== Thomas (1259–1266) ==
Thomas, the newly elected abbot, had previously been the abbey's precentor. On 10 January 1259 the king issued a writ de intendendo to the abbey's tenants, calling on them to accept Thomas as abbot and lord, An important grant issued by the king in 1267 makes clear that Thomas led the abbey in supporting Simon de Montfort, 6th Earl of Leicester, during the Second Barons' War. As a tenant-in-chief, Thomas was summoned to Simon de Montfort's Parliament.

Thomas was dead by 18 May 1266, when the king at Northampton received news of the event and issued a licence for an election. Eleven days later the king approved the installation of a new vicar for the parish church at Edgmond, where Shrewsbury Abbey held the advowson, as the abbacy was still vacant.

== William de Upton (1266–1271) ==
Henry III issued a writ de intendendo in favour of William from Kenilworth on 11 August 1266 and followed this up with a request that the tenants grant him a relief to help meet the abbey's debts. In September 1267 the king was in Shrewsbury and, in return for a fine of 50 marks, gave the abbey the right to administer its own goods and estates during the next vacancy, a great boon as it generally fell under royal control during such periods. It was also announced:

And let it be known that the king has remitted to the abbot and convent all rancour and indignation of mind conceived towards them by occasion of the disturbance had in the realm, and pardoned all trespasses said to have been committed by them in adhering to S. sometime earl of Leicester, and his accomplices at the time of the said disturbance.

William probably died late in 1271, as two Shrewsbury monks, Luke of Wenlock and Philip of Pershore, on 27 December obtained a licence to hold an election from the king at Winchester.

== Luke de Wenlock (1272–1278) ==
Luke, one of the monks who took news of William de Upton's death to the king, was himself soon elected abbot. Henry III both assented to the election and issued a writ de intendendo in his favour on 24 January 1272 at the Tower of London.

In March 1274 Luke was granted protection to travel overseas by Edward I so that he could attend the Second Council of Lyon, which tried unsuccessfully to bridge the East–West Schism. By 1275 he had bought for the abbey a house in the parish of St Ethelburga in Bishopsgate for use by abbots on parliamentary business. He earmarked the rental income from this London house, a new mill at Baschurch, and four houses in Abbey Foregate to support the abbey kitchen as a chantry for himself.

Luke took an active part in tax farming, a potentially lucrative activity. In 1277 Shrewsbury Abbey was used as a centre for collecting and disbursing the product of a fifteenth. Luke and the sheriff were ordered to transfer very large sums at frequent intervals to royal servants: £500 on 24 March, £318 on 30 March, and £304 6s. on 25 April. The abbey lands were taken into the hands of the king in 1278 for an unspecified act of contempt by the abbot and held by the Sheriff of Staffordshire, the king's escheator in Shropshire. The estates were released on 18 June after payment of a fine of 50 marks. However, the receipts from the period of sequestration were handed over, so the fine seems to have been the limit of the loss.

Luke must have resigned late in 1278. Two Shrewsbury monks, Richard of Wenlock (possibly a relative) and Richard Ludlow, took the news to the king at Windsor Castle and received a licence to elect a new abbot on 3 January 1279.

== John de Drayton (1279–1292) ==
Royal assent was given at Westminster for John de Drayton's election on 24 January 1279. and the writ de intendendo followed on 11 February from Woodstock Palace. In 1280 Archbishop John Peckham carried out a canonical visitation of the abbey. He was particularly interested in the charters and deeds supporting the convent's rights over various properties: he kept the number small because of the fragility of many of the documents. After inspecting the instruments, the archbishop pronounced himself satisfied. However, the abbey clearly had financial problems. In May 1281 the king ordered the abbot to pay 20 marks annually towards £63 8s. 8d. he owed to the Crown, one of a number of debts. In March 1284 the debt stood at £64 10s. And the repayments were increased to £20.

The abbey properties appear to have been one of Abbot John's preoccupations. On 20 April 1284, after an inquisition by Justice in Eyre Roger Le Strange, he received a licence to enclose 10 acres in the Forest of Shirlet, an area closer to the abbey's cell, Morville Priory, than to Shrewsbury. However, on 6 July 1286 the king accused Abbot John of breaching the Statute of Westminster 1285, Chapter 41, which provided for the recovery of Church lands that had been given away. The Sheriff was ordered to seize a small estate, consisting of a house and one carucate of land, at Mere in Staffordshire that John had conveyed to William de Morton. This had been a royal gift to establish a chantry. However, about a year later the land was provisionally restored to Morton, as it was claimed he had only been holding it in fee at an annual rent of 2½ marks. It had been established that it was granted by Henry I to provide for a cleric to say Mass for his soul in the church of Woodhouse, on the estate. However, the abbey had never kept their side of the bargain and no priest had yet been appointed. Abbot John seems to have made some modest acquisitions as well as leading the monastery into financial and legal difficulties. In 1292 the abbey gained some valuable property close by in Abbey Foregate: four houses, with 13 acres of land and an acre of meadow. On 20 January a licence was granted by the king for Richard, son of the clerk Richard, to alienate the property in mortmain.

John de Drayton's death was reported to the king in Northumberland by Richard of Ludlow and Ranulph de Bydeford on 27 May 1292 and they were issued with a licence to hold an election.

== William of Muckley (1292–1333) ==
The king had reached Berwick-upon-Tweed when he assented to the election of William of Muckley on 20 June 1292. He was still there when he ordered Malcolm de Harle, his escheator beyond the Trent, who was farming the abbey's revenues, to restore its temporalities and issued the writ to the tenants on 2 July. William's byname occurs in a number of forms. Owen and Blakeway gave it as Mokeleye but pointed out that this probably signifies Muckley, a hamlet on the road between the Shrewsbury's daughter house at Morville and Much Wenlock. They point out that a significant number of abbots bear Shropshire toponyms as bynames, and he seems to be one of them. The rendering Muckley is used, without comment, by the Victoria County History.

Abbot William travelled to the Papal Curia in Rome around the turn of the century. On 27 August 1300 the king granted him protection for foreign travel, to last until the following Whitsun. No reason for the journey is mentioned but this was the time of Jubilee, proclaimed by Boniface VIII. On 1 January 1301 letters were filed with the king, appointing as his attorneys during his absence Master Roger of Wenlock and Hugh Aleyn of Minsterley. Roger seems to have been closely associated with the abbey. He and Richard de Waleton made grants small estates at Astley Abbotts, each consisting of a house and a half virgate of land. William of Muckley paid the fine for alienation in mortmain of these gifts and the king, campaigning in Scotland, granted the licence on 10 May 1304 at Stirling. He seems to have made considerable gains while leading the community through very difficult times. The economic crisis of the early 14th century forced the abbey into adaptations. One strategy, presumably pioneered by Abbot William, was to shed the risks of demesne farming in favour of the secure income stream from leases: the abbey's Shropshire demesnes contracted from 21 carucates in 1291 to 12 in 1355.

In the early 1320s, Bishop Roger Northburgh carried out a canonical visitation and listed a number of failings. The abbot and his officials were not rendering account as demanded by the constitutions of the abbey: Northburgh recommended this should be done formally at least once, preferably twice, a year before the entire chapter. There was a requirement to read aloud twice annually a compilation of Papal ordinances on monastic conduct: this was not being done and Northburgh demanded that the practice be observed or the prior would be suspended. He noted that liveries (benefits in the form of clothes) and corrodies (annuities conferring maintenance at the abbey) were out of control and ordered that no more be sold or granted without diocesan consent. Too many monks were absent from the daily refectory: Northburgh prescribed ¾ of the chapter as the norm. Finally, novices were too often allowed out of the monastery site before they had learnt the Rule. However, a list of this kind was not exceptional and signified generally good discipline. A specific incident of disobedience did, however, irritate the bishop, perhaps at about the same time. In February 1324 Northburgh wrote to Muckley to rehearse the case of William de Coventre, a Shrewsbury monk who had rebelled against monastic discipline and left the abbey. He had repented and even asked to be transferred to a stricter order. This proved impossible, so he had asked for readmission to Shrewsbury. Meanwhile, he was living as an anchorite near Warwick. Northburgh wanted him readmitted, after suitable penance. It seems that Abbot William and his house were reluctant to oblige, as the bishop was forced to write to them again, this time instructing them to deal with the errant monk.

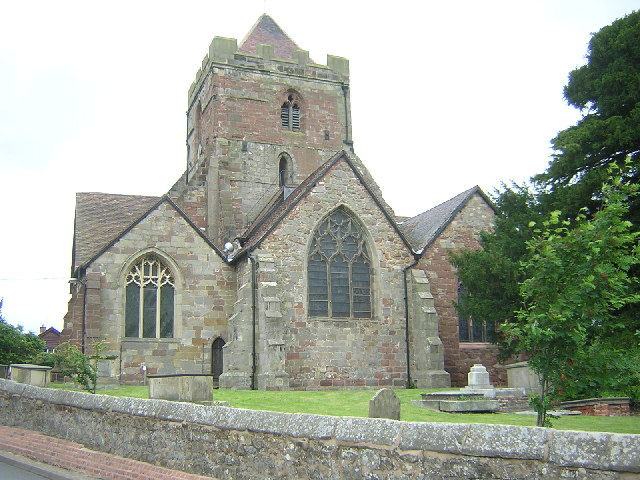
St Peter's Church, Wrockwardine.

During the 13th century the general chapter of the English Benedictines had decreed that all abbeys maintain two monks at Oxford University. To make the funding permanent, Abbot William earmarked the tithes from Wrockwardine parish church, the advowson of which had been granted to the abbey by Roger Montgomery shortly after its establishment, as recorded in Domesday Book. On 26 July 1329 at Windsor, Edward III granted the abbey a licence to appropriate the church. In 1333, just after William's death, and referring to the request of King Edward and Queen Philippa, the Pope issued a mandate confirming the appropriation, so long as enough was left over to support a perpetual vicar.

The king was notified of William of Muckley's death by the monks William de Brugg and Thomas de Acton at Newcastle upon Tyne on 26 April 1333. He issued the licence to elect a successor. In July of the year the monks of Shrewsbury Abbey established a chantry for Abbot William in the chapel of St Winifred because he had:

in the time of his rule he so governed them and their monastery with diligent foresight, that he not only recovered what had been lost, collected together what had been dispersed, and attentively preserved what was collected together, but also increased their rents and possessions, and moreover acquired new ones, and, what is by no means to be omitted, nourished them happily and instructed them, as well by the example of good works, as by spiritual food.

== Adam de Clebury (1333–1355) ==
At Tweedmouth on 20 May 1333 Edward III notified royal assent for the election of Prior Adam de Clebury as abbot. Apparently the convent had some difficulty coming to agreement and deputed an electoral college of seven to come to a decision. Still at Tweedmouth on 8 June the king ordered John de Peyto, his escheator in the region, to restore the temporalities, which were in the custody of William de Acton and John de Watenhull. He also issued the writ de intendendo to all the tenants. However, it was in March of the following year that the king presented a new incumbent to St Luke's Church, Hodnet, where the advowson belonged to Shrewsbury Abbey. This seems to be because the vacancy at Hodnet had occurred between the death of Muckley and the election of Adam of Clebury. The aftermath was to be prolonged and violent.

Adam continued his predecessor's policy of adapting the abbey's resources for changing circumstances. Under a charter of Henry I, the convent had considerable freedom to cut timber in the royal forests in Shropshire. However, deforestation and poor communications, particularly the unreliability of the bridges over the Severn and the Tern, made this hard to exercise. On 29 March 1346, for a fine of £100, the king allowed them to give up this ancient liberty for a smaller but more manageable alternative. They surrendered Henry I's charter for the right to enclose 240 acres of conveniently situated woodland, the Lythwood, for which they would pay an annual rent of 60 shillings. Adam had been instructed to provide a house in the abbey to keep the tax money collected on the king's behalf and in 1346 the king borrowed 200 marks from him towards the cost of the Hundred Years' War.

However, relations with the king were not entirely cordial. On 4 May 1346, having triumphed in a court case against the abbot, the king presented Richard de Derby, one of his own chaplains to Hodnet parish church. This was just one episode in a long and complex dispute, dating back to the last vacancy in the abbacy, 13 years previously. Clearly it was not enough to settle the matter, as a year later the king ordered the arrest of people still trying to install Richard de Hethe, a rival candidate. In February 1349 he repeated the order, apparently in some exasperation, this time instructing "all sheriffs, mayors, bailiffs, ministers and others to attach without violence the bodies of Nicholas de Hetth and all others" who were still resisting the court judgement in the king's favour. This still gentle approach did not work. In October of the same year the king was forced to depute Sir Robert Corbet of Moreton Corbet and others to suppress a violent outbreak at Hodnet, in which the protesting party had attacked the rectory, assaulted the parson and his servants, expelled them from the house and destroyed animals, crops and goods.

In September 1348 Edward III ordered an investigation into the state of the hospital of St Giles at Shrewsbury, a leper colony dating from at least as the reign of Henry II. He alleged that the wardens and residents who had no right to be there had been plundering the hospital's wealth for many years, alienating its estates. Abbot Adam was commissioned, along with the abbot of Haughmond Abbey and Robert Harley, to carry out a thorough review, checking documents and interviewing witnesses. They were empowered to do all that was necessary to restore order, including the removal of both officers and residents.

The Black Death arrived in Shropshire early in the earl spring of 1349, with variable but generally devastating consequences. By 1355 the abbey's manor of Betton, near Market Drayton, for example, had 33 virgates lying empty and uncultivated because the tenants had died. The lack of labour and surplus of land clearly had a major impact on the abbey, which was noted by Bishop Northburgh, who carried out a visitation of the abbey in February 1354, exhorting the convent to mend the many properties that had fallen into disrepair "not by their fault, but by the mailce of the time and the scarcity of workmen." However, he was impressed by their adaptations, and described the newly acquired Lythwood as a "perpetual jewel." He found the abbey's discipline a laudable contrast to conditions at Haughmond, Lilleshall and Wombridge, the nearby Augustinian houses. He recounted his pleasure at hearing "their conversation according to the traditions of the holy fathers and the canonical statutes."

Adam de Clebury died the following year, although the cause is unknown. The king heard of his death and issued the licence for an election on 22 July 1355.

== Henry de Alton (1355–1361) ==
The election of Henry de Alston received the royal assent on 3 August 1355 The mandate to restore his temporalities and the writ to the tenants were issued on 11 August.

The breakdown in order in this period must have been marked and it affected the abbey. A year after Henry's consecration Robert Corbet and three other local notables were commissioned to investigate the "homicides, robberies, felonies and trespasses done by William Hord, monk of Shrewsbury, and others of his confederacy." However, in 1358 the tables were turned when raiders attacked and entered the abbey, abducted a monk, Roger de Umfreston, and took away goods. The impact was such that the abbot, monks and officials of the abbey "dare not go forth from the abbey...without a great force to save their life." The king, as usual, sent a party of local landed gentry to investigate and proceed against the malefactors.

Henry de Alton died in 1361. The king was notified on 12 October and issued the licence for an election to the prior and convent.

== Nicholas Stevens (1361–1399) ==
Edward III gave the royal assent to the election of Nicholas Stevens on 17 November 1361. It was the prior of Wenlock Priory, rather than the bishop, who confirmed him as abbot on 23 November. The mandate to restore the temporalities and the writ de intendendo were issued at Westminster on 11 December.

Henry de Alton had died after a short period of office during a major outbreak of the plague, although there is no evidence that he actually died of it. However, it is clear that the death rate was high and there was a shortage of clerics, as there was of labourers. In 1365 Abbot Stevens and the prior of Coventry were each granted a faculty by the Pope to ordain ten priests to make up the numbers. Discipline remained a problem. In 1371 Stevens reported one of his monks, Roger de Hethton, to the king for leaving the abbey and wandering as a vagabond. The king sent out orders for his officials and trusted landowners in the region to look out for Hethton and to arrest and return him to the abbot for punishment. Stevens, like his predecessors, was also drafted in when clerical expertise was required for reforming institutions. He was one of those commissioned on 9 February 1376 to inspect and reform the Hospital of St John the Baptist in Shrewsbury, which was alleged to be in a dilapidated condition. They were given authority to do everything short of dismissing the warden, Thomas Barker, who was newly appointed, and it seems that Barker might have requested the visitation to strengthen his own hand.

In the case of Sandwell Priory, near West Bromwich in Staffordshire, a small and sometimes poorly governed Benedictine house, Stevens sought complete annexation to Shrewsbury Abbey – a project for which he was prepared to use the most unscrupulous means. Initially the chosen tool was probably Richard Tudenham, who contested the position of the elected prior, John de Kyngeston around 1370. At Easter 1372 Kyngeston cited five men in the King's Bench, who he alleged had assaulted him: they failed to appear and the Sheriff was ordered to arrest them. When the five finally appeared before the court, in summer 1373, Kyngeston alleged that one of them, John de Witton, had shot him in the arm with an arrow. Witton, however, claimed that the writ had been incorrectly drawn up, as it named Kyngeston as the prior of Sandwell, when the real prior was Tudenham. Kyngeston then pursued a case against Abbot Stevens of Shrewsbury, who was possibly behind the events, although the nature of the case is unknown. On 8 December 1379 a commission of oyer and terminer was issued because of the allegations made by Kyngeston against Nicholas Stevens and his associates. Kyngeston complained that he had been assaulted at Sandwell by a gang consisting of Stevens himself, two monks from Shrewsbury Abbey, the vicar of Handsworth and four other secular clergy. He was then abducted and held at a house in Sleap, north of Shrewsbury, one the Abbey's manors. There he was forced to sign a document before a notary public resigning his position as prior and cancelling all proceedings against Stevens. However, events proceeded as if Kyngeston's resignation had been valid. Bishop Robert de Stretton received letters under the seal of Sandwell Priory stating that the two remaining monks had elected as their prior Richard de Westbury, one of the Shrewsbury monks alleged to have helped Stevens abduct Kyngeston. He therefore confirmed Westbury as prior. Tudenham challenged Westbury's appointment by obtaining papal provision to the priory but his arrest was ordered by Richard II's Council on 8 July 1380 on the grounds that this breached the Statute of Provisors, a law designed to prevent such appeals to the Pope. Stevens's candidate, Westbury, was left in control until his death around 1391, when a further round of litigation and violence ensued.

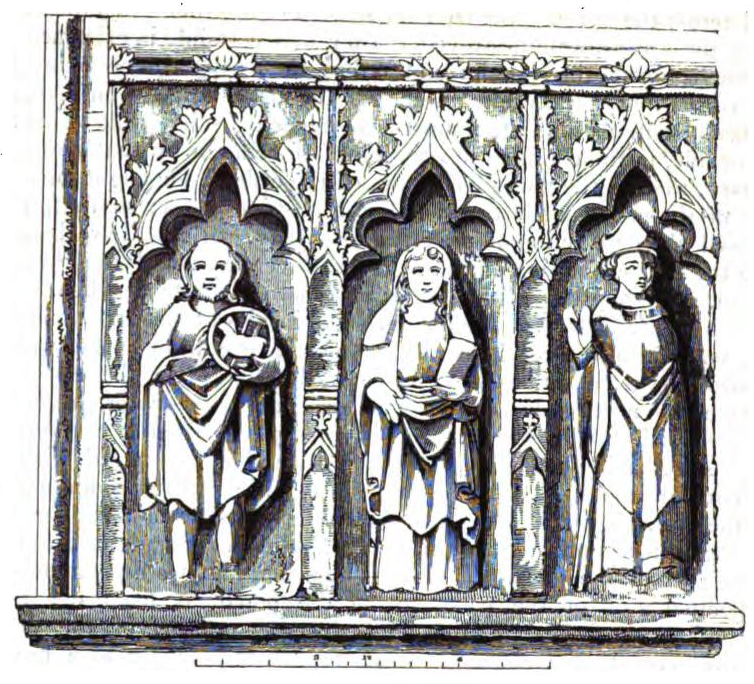
Drawing of a carved stone from Shrewsbury Abbey, thought to depict St Winifred, flanked by John the Baptist (a decapitated saint) and Beuno, her uncle. This grouping reflects the cult of St Winifred as practised from the abbacy of Stevens, when Beuno's relics were stolen by the abbey.

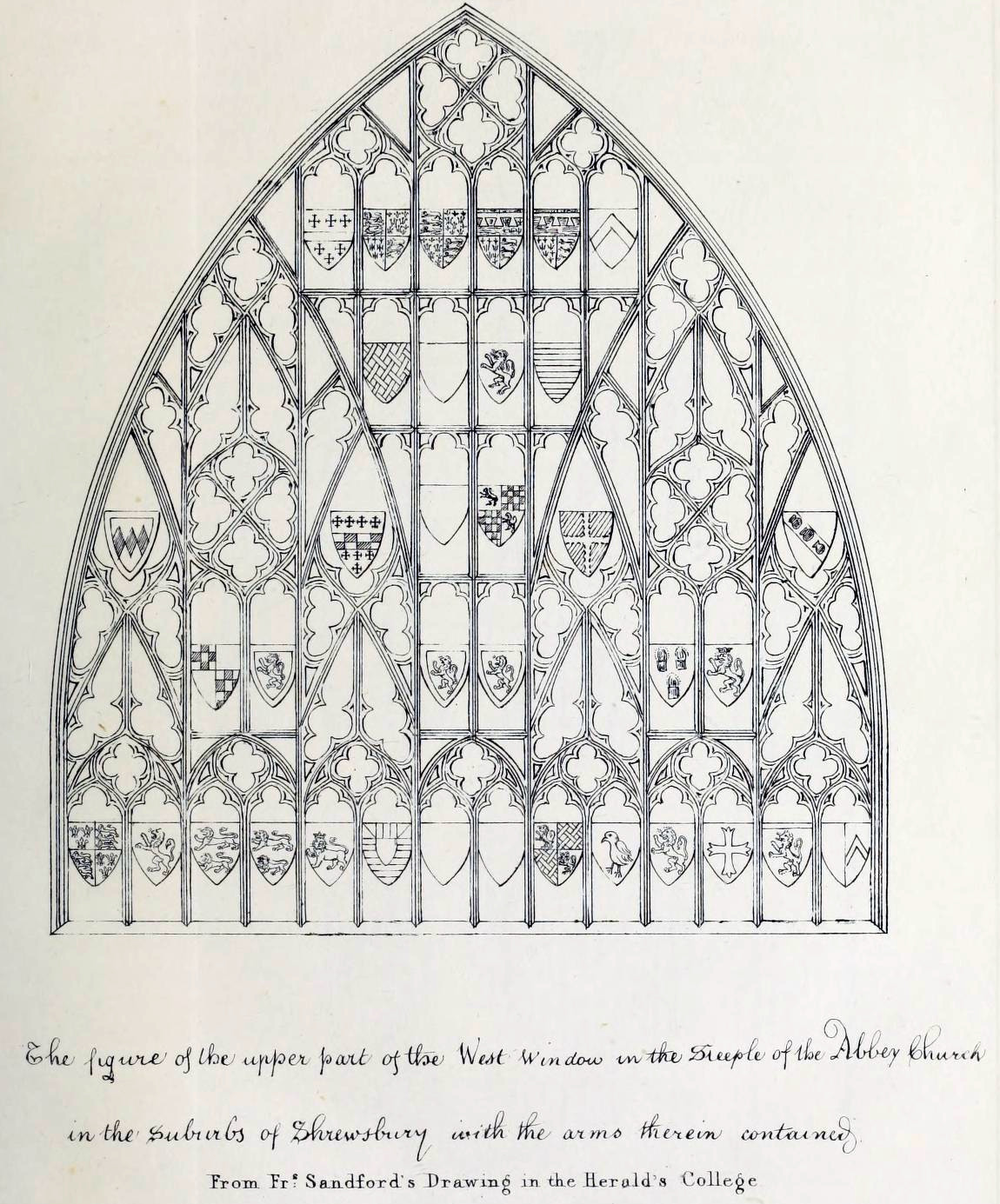
Sketch of West Window, Shrewsbury Abbey, 1658, by Francis Sandford.

Stevens seems to have pursued the embellishment of Shrewsbury Abbey itself with equal determination. Under Stevens a new shrine was built for St Winifred. It was also under Stevens that a party of Shrewsbury monks stole the relics of St Beuno, St Winifred's uncle and confessor, from Rhewl and installed them in the abbey church. Although the abbey was fined, it was allowed to keep the relics. During the 14th century considerable rebuilding took place at the west end of the Abbey. The herald Francis Sandford made a sketch of the great west window, since lost, in 1658. The selection of coats of arms shown on it suggest it was glazed in the time of Stevens, around 1388. It is likely he was responsible for some of the other 14th century alterations.

Although no stranger to lawbreaking, Stevens was one of the great landlords of the region and it was natural he should stand alongside the others in maintaining law and order. On 15 April 1383 he and Richard FitzAlan, 11th Earl of Arundel were added to the commission of the peace and the commission of oyer and terminer for Shropshire. The Fitzalans were one of the main landowning dynasties in the county and also had extensive lands in the south, making them major territorial magnates nationally. The Arundel affinity dominated politics in the county, accounting for at least half the MPs elected in the period 1386–1421. Serious violence was not uncommon in the period, and both the secular and the clerical magnates were involved. There were affrays around the Shrewsbury Abbey itself and monks were not always the victims. On 3 November 1385 the monk William de Aston was granted a pardon for the murder of John Mason of Abbey Foregate. In November 1388, however, investigations were launched into a complaint from Stevens that a gang of tradesmen from Shrewsbury had broken into his properties, taken away goods and terrorised his men so that they dare not leave the abbey. However, internal discipline problems had not gone away. The delinquent monk Roger Hethton made a further appearance in the records in 1394, when he required a pardon for stealing from Stevens two large silver dishes, valued at eight marks.

Stevens acquired considerable lands for the abbey, particularly in the convenient and valuable areas around the town of Shrewsbury, and it appears that he actively sought donations. In 1392, for example, he paid 100s. in advance to the king for the right to acquire lands valued at 100s. per annum. The licence for alienation into mortmain, issued on 15 August, covered six houses and 70½ acres in Abbey Foregate, given by four clerks, and smaller properties elsewhere in Shropshire. Another licence, issued on the same day, covered gifts of urban property from some of the same donors in Castle Foregate, including ten shops and 16 acres.

Stevens was on good terms with the king, who attributed his grant of a charter in 1389 not only to his own devotion to St Winifred, but also "the sincere affection we bear and have to Nicholas the abbot, and for his merits." In 1397 the Pope honoured him by granting the right to use the mitre and other pontifical insignia, in addition to the ring. Stevens's death was notified while the king was away in Ireland, during the final crisis of his reign, and his officials issued the licence to elect a new abbot on 25 July 1399 at Wallingford, Oxfordshire.

== Thomas Prestbury (1399–1426) ==
It is likely Thomas Prestbury, was born at Prestbury, Cheshire, near Macclesfield. He was ordained a subdeacon on 13 March 1367, so he probably became a monk at Shrewsbury Abbey before that date. He was made a deacon the following year on 3 June and a priest on 21 September 1370. He seems to have spent much of his early monastic career as a student. He was one of the two monks maintained by the abbey at Oxford University from the tithes of Wrockwardine. Prestbury evidently made the best of this funding, as he is known to have become a master of theology before he was elected abbot. A Benedictine called Thomas Scherusbury was Chancellor of the University of Oxford in 1393-4: the identification with Prestbury is now regarded as unlikely, although it was taken for granted in earlier times.

On 6 April 1399 Richard II wrote to Nicholas Stevens ordering that Prestbury should be detained and delivered into the custody of the abbot of Westminster. He was to be collected by John Lowell, serjeant at arms, for transfer to Westminster Abbey. The order to the abbot of Westminster said Prestbury was detained "for particular causes specially moving the king." Hence he spent the final critical summer of Richard II's reign in custody. It was apparently the chronicler Adam of Usk who secured his release and promotion. Usk accompanied Henry Bolingbroke and Archbishop Thomas Arundel on their triumphal progress from Bristol to Chester, as they sought an opportunity to confront the absent king. He claimed that he approached them on Prestbury's behalf as they paused at Ludlow.

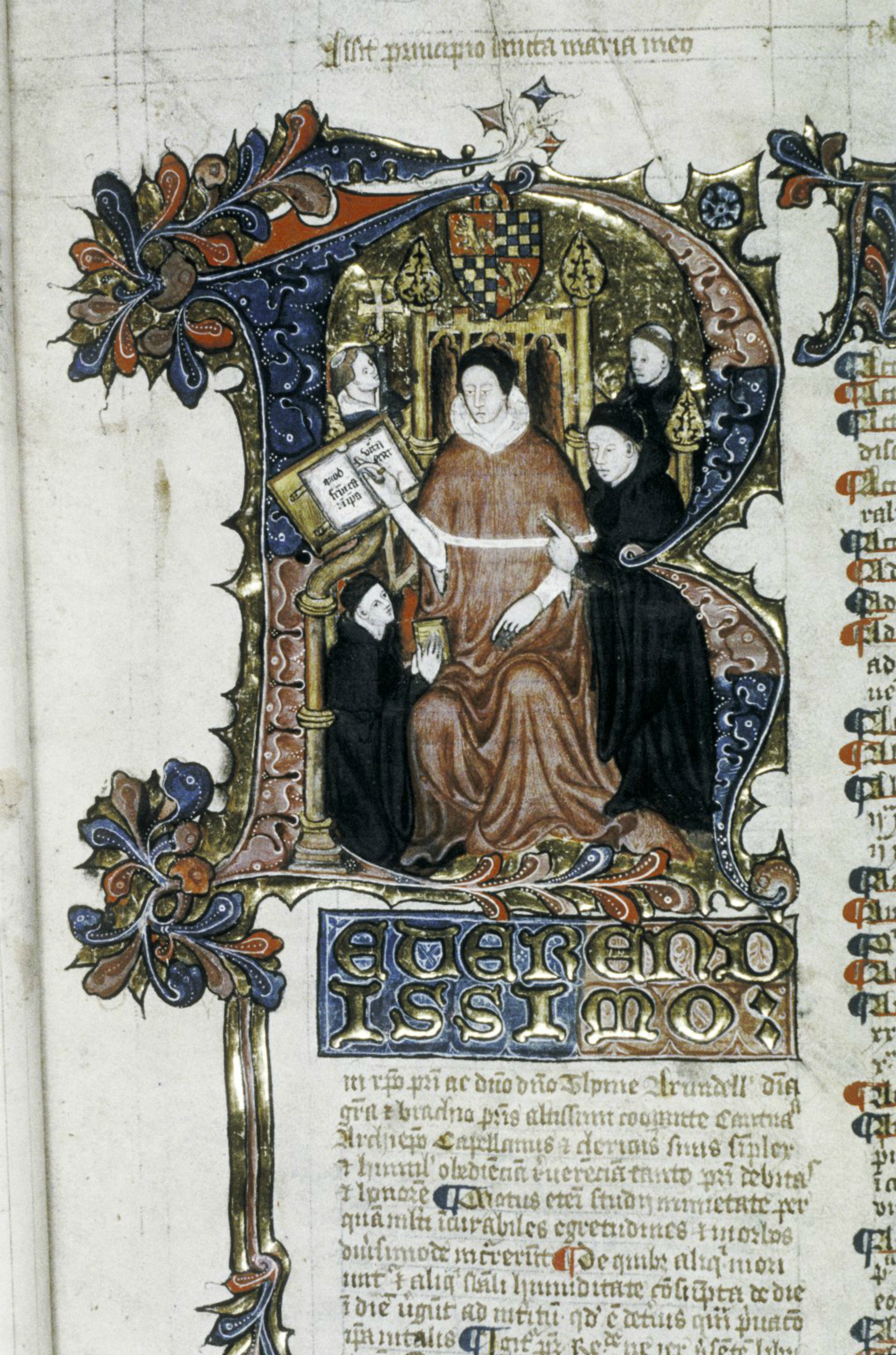
Archbishop Thomas Arundel, a key figure in Prestbury's career, depicted within a historiated initial R.

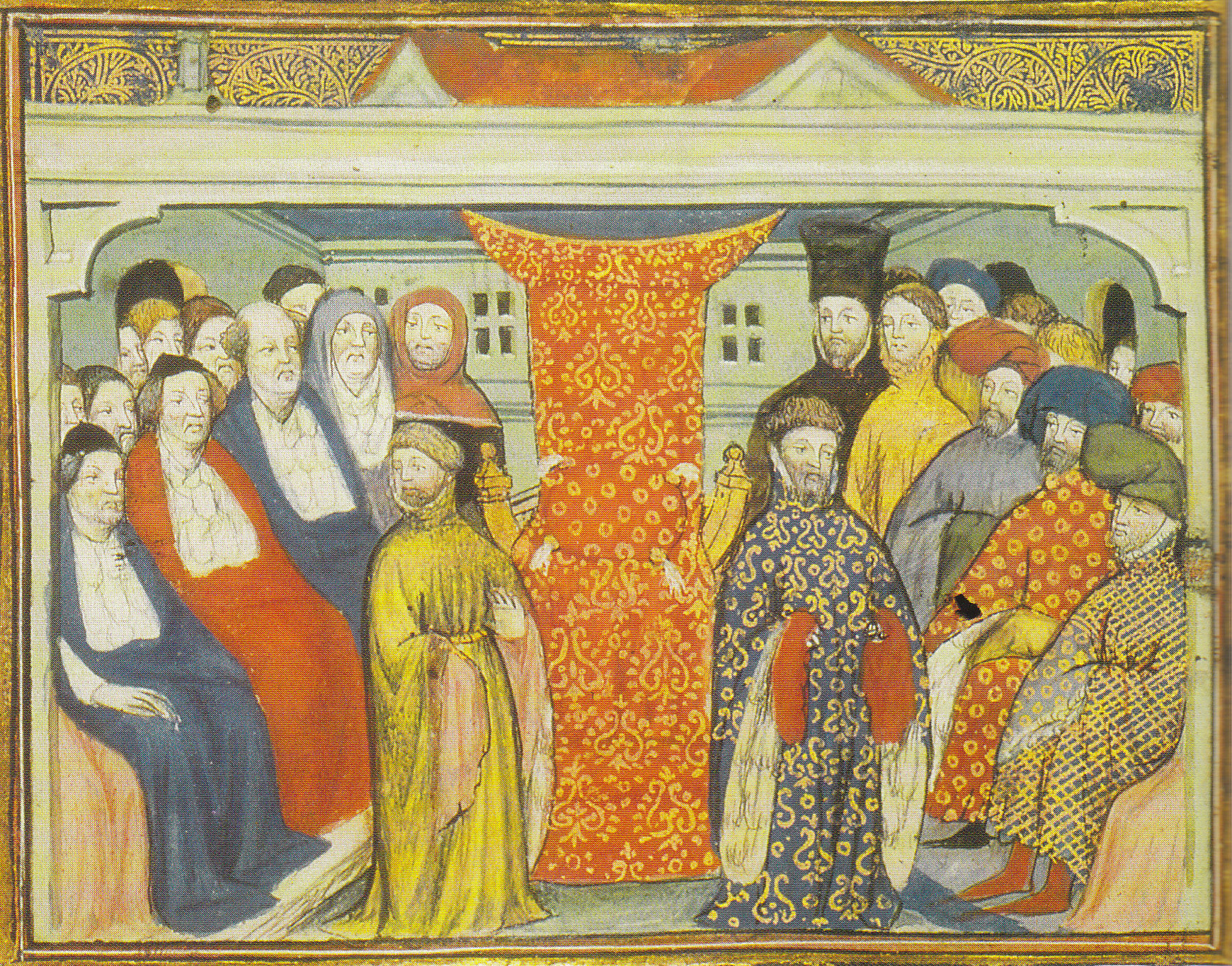
Henry of Bolingbroke, flanked by the lords spiritual and temporal, claims the throne in 1399

| Latin | English |
|---|---|
| Ubi presencium compilator ab eo et a domino Cantuariensi fratrem Thomam Prestburi, magistrum in theologia, ipsius contemporarium Oxonie, monachum de Salopia, tunc carceribus per regem Ricardum detentum, eo quod contra excessus suos quedam merito predicasset, ab huiusmodi carceribus liberari, et in abbatem monasterii sui erigi, optinuit. Demum per Salopiam transitus ibi per duos dies mansit; ubi fecit proclamari quod excercitus suus se ad Cestriam dirigeret, tamen populo et patrie parceret, eo quod per internuncios se sibi submiserant. | At this place, I, who am now writing, obtained from the duke and from my lord of Canterbury the release of brother Thomas Prestbury, master in theology, a man of my day at Oxford and a monk of Shrewsbury, who was kept in prison by king Richard, for that he had righteously preached certain things against his follies; and I also got him promotion to the abbacy of his house. Then, passing through Shrewsbury, the duke tarried there two days; where he made proclamation that the host should march on Chester, but should spare the people and the country, because by mediation they had submitted themselves to him. |

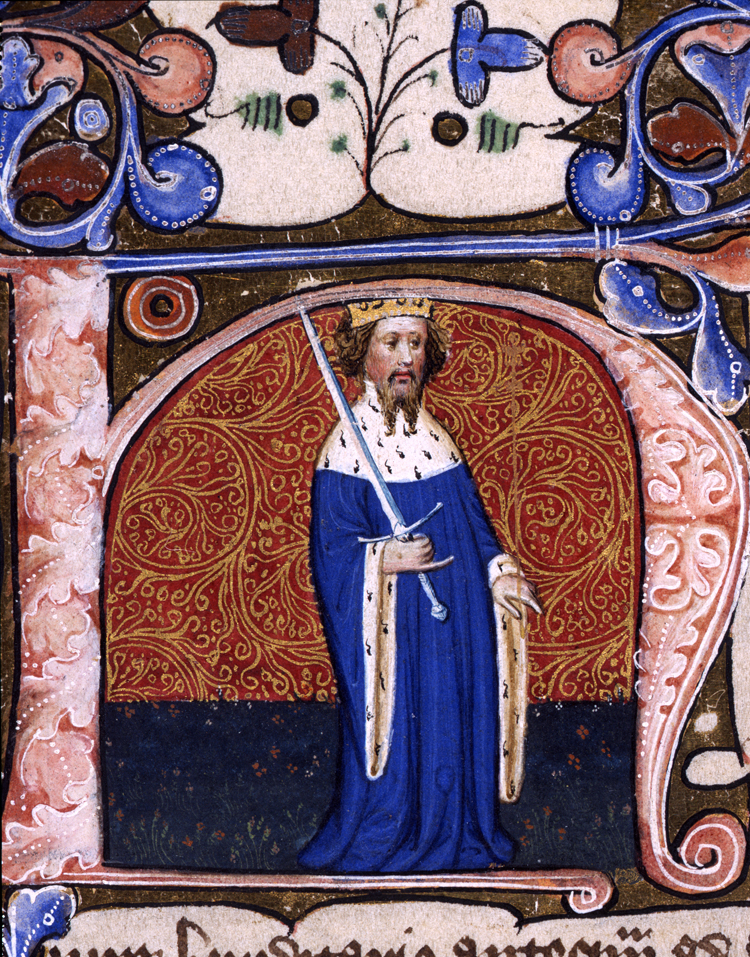
Illumination showing Henry IV.

Probably hastened by the intervention of the Bolingbroke and Arundel, the chapter elected Prestbury and one of the first acts of the new régime, from Chester on 17 August, was to notify the bishop of royal assent for the election. After some delay, as he presumably need to be fetched from Westminster, Prestbury was admitted as abbot on 4 September 1399 and the mandate to restore temporalities, accompanied by the wri intendendo, addressed to the tenants, was issued from Westminster on 7 September. Early in his abbacy, Prestbury had to attend parliament to attend to the business of deposing Richard II and recognising Bolingbroke as King Henry IV.

From this point, at least, Prestbury was a loyal supporter of the House of Lancaster. In 1403 Prestbury was an emissary to the House of Percy in an attempt to avert what became the Battle of Shrewsbury. According to Thomas Walsingham, Prestbury and another cleric, a clerk of the Privy Seal, went on a peace mission to the rebels, offering Henry Hotspur "peace and pardon if he would refrain from opening" hostilities. Hotspur's uncle, Thomas Percy, 1st Earl of Worcester, was ambivalent in his attitude to negotiations and was beheaded after the battle. In December Prestbury was instructed to recover his head, on display at London Bridge, and have it buried in Shrewsbury Abbey with his body. On 20 May 1405 the abbey was dispensed, during Prestbury's lifetime, from paying the tenths, a key royal tax, on its properties outside the Diocese of Lichfield because of the damage done by to its lands by Welsh rebels.

The Victoria County History argues that the appointment of Prestbury as abbot after Richard II's imprisonment is "a circumstance suggesting that Prestbury favoured the Lancastrians." However, of the coalition that overthrew Richard II, it may have been to the Arundel faction that Prestbury was closest. The Arundel affinity, centred on the Archbishop's nephew, Thomas FitzAlan, 12th Earl of Arundel since the execution of Earl Richard in 1397, once again became a powerful force in Shropshire. Among the small acquisitions of property made in Shrewsbury during Prestbury's abbacy was a house known as "Ireland Hall." Royal permission to accept this burgage was sought in July 1407 by Prestbury and the convent of Shrewsbury Abbey. The donors included four gentry members of the Arundel affinity, probably acting on the Earl's behalf: Robert Corbet, his younger brother Roger, their aunt's husband John Darras and William Ryman of Sussex. Darras, an experienced soldier in the war against Owain Glyndŵr, and the Corbets were violent men, no strangers to affray on their own or their patron's account. On 25 July 1407, a few days after the licence was granted for Ireland Hall, Prestbury was commissioned, along with the Earl of Arundel and two of his closest supporters, David Holbache and John Burley, to attend to the fortifications of Shrewsbury, using money from customs granted by Richard II.

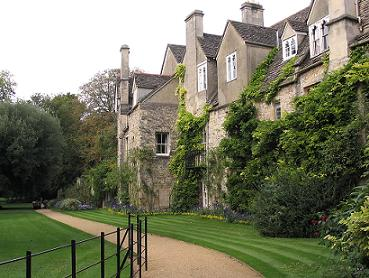
Medieval buildings at Worcester College, Oxford, part of the Benedictine Gloucester College.

Prestbury probably owed his appointment as Chancellor of the University of Oxford in July 1409 to the support of Archbishop Arundel. His academic interests seem to have remained strong. During this period he was awarded a doctorate in theology by the university. He was later, in 1413, to secure two rooms in Gloucester College, Oxford for use by monks from Shrewsbury Abbey. However, he seems to have been useful to Arundel mainly as part of his campaign against Lollardy. A later chancellor, Thomas Gascoigne recorded that, as the commissary of the Bishop of Lincoln, Prestbury oversaw the burning of John Wycliffe's books at Carfax in the centre of Oxford, in 1410. Arundel wanted to root out what he saw as heresy in the academic community: Peter Payne and William Taylor and like-minded critics of clerical abuses. Armed with a list of heretical ideas furnished by committees he had set up for both universities, in March 1411 he moved to impose a canonical visitation on Oxford University, which strongly resisted, claiming exemption under a papal bull of Boniface IX. Prestbury published notice of Arundel's intention to carry out the visitation of the university, provoking strong resistance to what was seen as an attack on academic freedom. St Mary's barred its doors against Arundel and the furore drew the king's attention. Prestbury's position became untenable and he resigned.

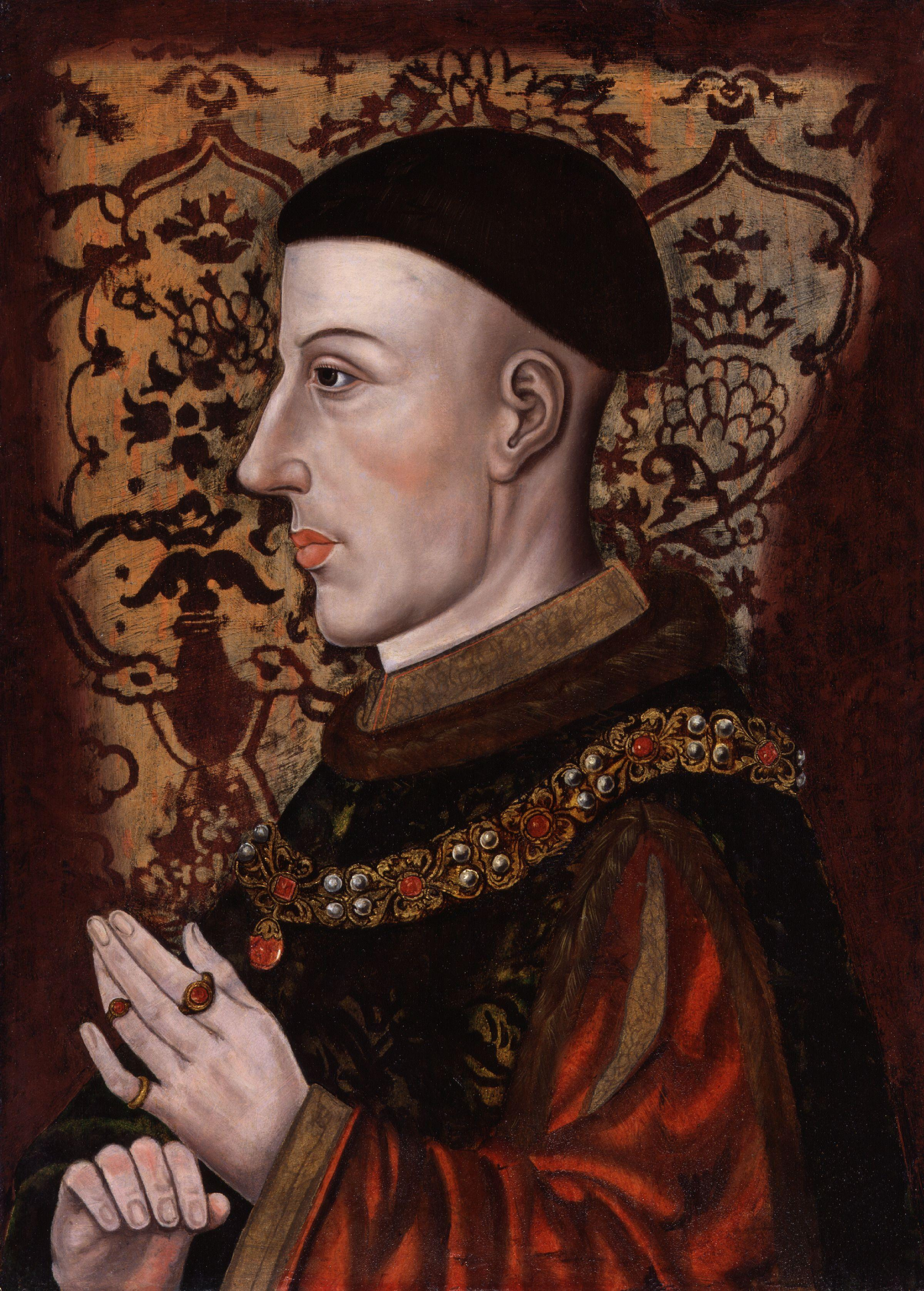
King Henry V, by unknown artist.

Large scale violence broke out across Shropshire in 1413 as the Arundel affinity took on supporters of John Talbot, 6th Baron Furnivall. At its peak the Arundel affinity recruited 2000 Chester men to attack Much Wenlock, the location of Wenlock Priory, an important rival of Shrewsbury Abbey. Henry V held the last ever regional sessions of the Court of King's Bench at Shrewsbury in Trinity term 1414, largely to deal with the violence. However, most cases were remanded at least once and the accused pardoned after their patrons stood surety for them. Prestbury himself received a general pardon from Henry IV in February 1413, covering "all treasons, insurrections, rebellions, felonies, misprisions, offences, impeachments and trespasses." This seems a little late for Prestbury's time at Oxford, but too early to relate to the major violence of that year, and has never been satisfactorily explained. Owen and Blakeway searched in vain for any record of accusations to match the various pardons he was granted.

By December 1413 Prestbury was sufficiently trusted by the new king to be commissioned with other eminent clerics for investigation and reform of St Mary's Church, Shrewsbury, a royal free chapel. Subsequently, the invasion of France in 1415 took many of the most violent men out of the region. The diplomatic prelude had been prolonged and perhaps prompted John Burley, a trusted lawyer in the service of Arundel and no longer young, to make preparations for his own death. On 1 December 1414, for a fine of £20, his agents were allowed to grant in mortmain substantial property at Alveley on the Severn. This was to fund a chantry for Burley himself and Julian, his wife, in the chapel of St Katharine at Shrewsbury Abbey. Arundel himself died of dysentery, contracted at the Siege of Harfleur and this may also account for Burley's death shortly afterwards.

On 28 November 1415 another pardon was issued to Prestbury and some tantalising details are given. It covered allegations of felony made by Ralph Wybynbury, a runaway monk from Shrewsbury Abbey. These were made in the County Palatine of Lancaster, united with the Crown since the accession of Henry IV but formally distinct from the rest of England. They went back some years, into the reign of Henry IV as well as of Henry V. The charges were serious enough to make it impossible for Prestbury to visit the county, where the abbey had considerable holdings. Nevertheless, the pardon does not specify the charges. It does, however, say of Prestbury that "on account divers infirmities he is so impotent that without geat bodily grievance he cannot labour for his deliverance." Even allowing for convenient exaggeration, it seems that Prestbury was now known to be infirm. He was probably at least 70 years old by this time.

Any discredit attaching to this second set of allegations seems to have dissipated quickly, as it seems Shrewsbury Abbey was soon honoured by a royal visit, placed some time shortly after the death and burial of Glyndŵr by Adam of Usk:

| Latin | English |
|---|---|
| Rex cum magna devocione ad fontem sancte Wenefrede in Northwalia et pedes a Salopia peregre proficiscitur. | "The king, with great reverence, went on foot in pilgrimage from Shrewsbury to St Winifred's well in North Wales." |

The royal journey, apparently after the Agincourt campaign, must have involved a royal stay at Shrewsbury Abbey, which was the starting point for pilgrimages to Holywell. This must have been a vote of confidence in Prestbury, although expensive and inconvenient for the abbey. It was probably on this visit that the king decided to establish a chantry chapel in the abbey, dedicated to St Winifred, for his own soul. Nothing further was heard of the project until 1463.

In 1421 a third set of accusations was made against Prestbury, alleging involvement in the escape of Sir John Oldcastle from the Tower of London in 1413. As Oldcastle was a known Lollard sympathiser, these accusations must have seemed far-fetched and nothing seems to have come of them.

Little is known of Prestbury's stewardship of the abbey. He did acquire some property for it: in 1405, for example, he paid 20 marks for a licence to take into mortmain some urban properties in Shrewsbury with an annual value of 6 marks. In 1423 he disputed with the town of Shrewsbury over the proceeds of the annual fair. Under Prestbury the abbey several times failed to make its annual contribution to the Benedictine chapter.

In 1426, just before Prestbury died, serious dissensions among the monks forced the chapter to intervene. The abbot of Burton Abbey was sent in and discovered that Prestbury was trying to secure the succession for William Pule, who was opposed by the other monks. The prior of Worcester Cathedral carried out a visitation during July but Prestbury around that time. The licence to elect a successor was issued on 23 July 1426.

== John Hampton (1426–1433) ==
The royal assent was given to the election of John Hampton as abbot on 17 August 1426. Evidently any conspiracy by Prestbury to pre-empt the election had failed: Hampton was the former prior of the abbey. He was confirmed by the bishop in Lilleshall parish church on 27 August. The mandate to restore temporalities was issued on 1 September, and was sent to the escheator of Cambridgeshire and the Chancellor of the County Palatine of Lancaster, in both of which the abbey had estates, as well Shropshire.

Relatively little is known of Hampton or his abbacy. Like other notables, he was required to support the country's military efforts. In 1430 he was one of those commissioned to raise "a notable sum of money" in Shropshire for the war in France. The following year he was given oversight of the use of local murage to fortify Shrewsbury against potential Welsh insurgency. Only in 1441, long after his death, did it transpire that he had colluded in illegal land deals relating to the abbey's manor of Hordley in north Shropshire.

Hampton died in 1433, presumably in the summer, as his successor was probably elected during August.

== Thomas Ludlow (1433–1459) ==
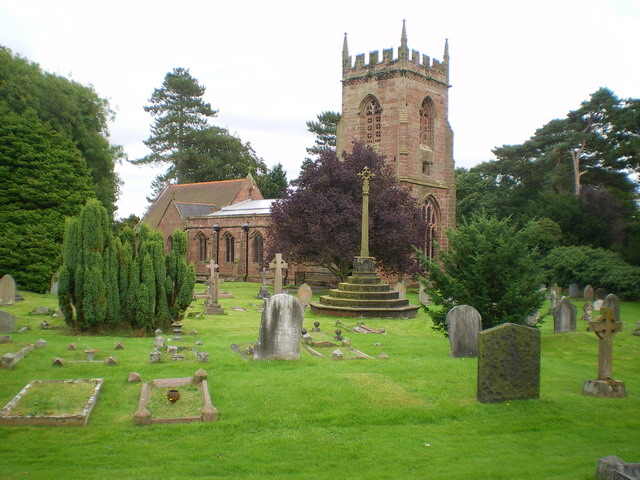
St Peter's Church, Edgmond.

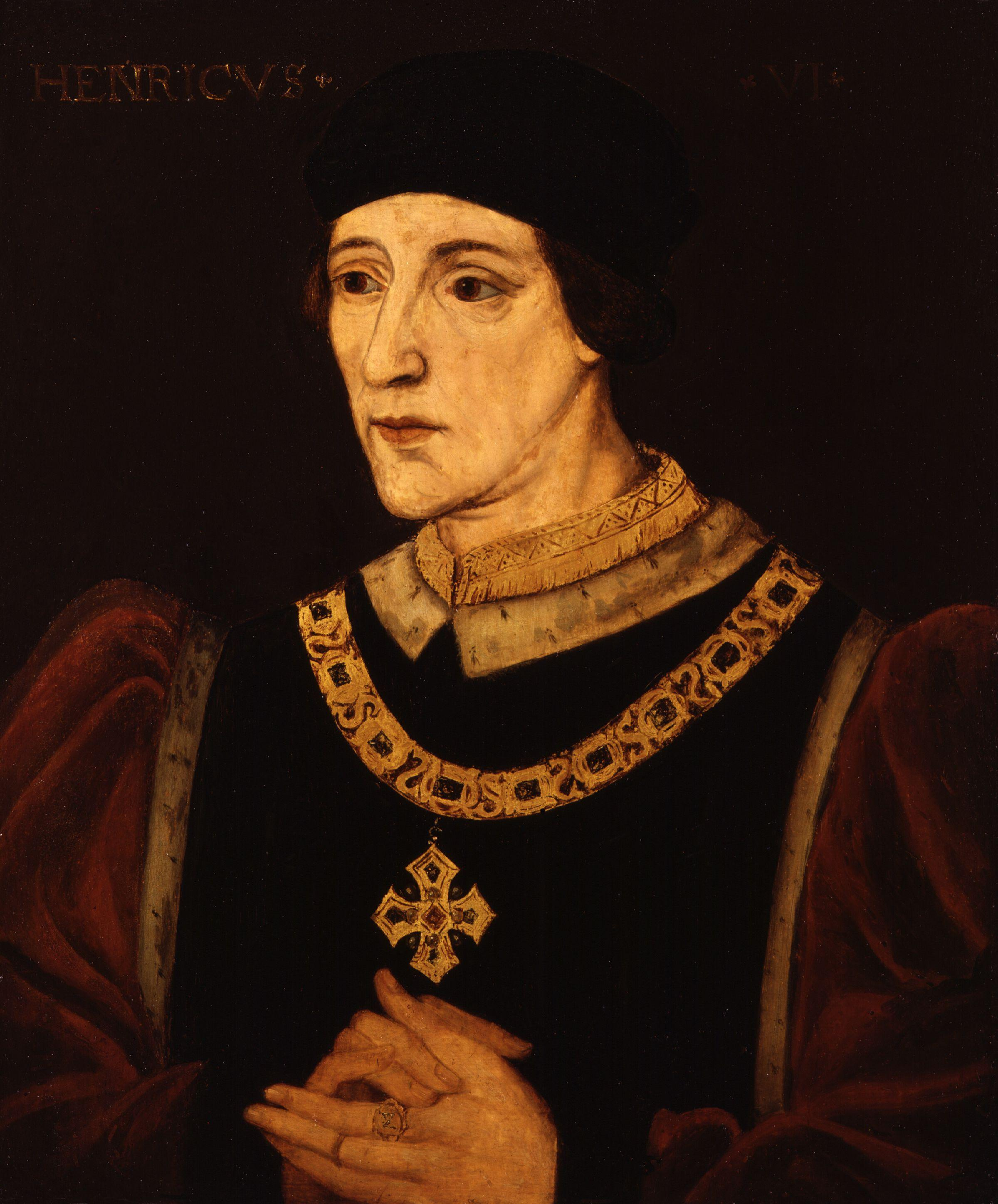
Henry VI, whose Cambridge foundation ultimately became King's College.

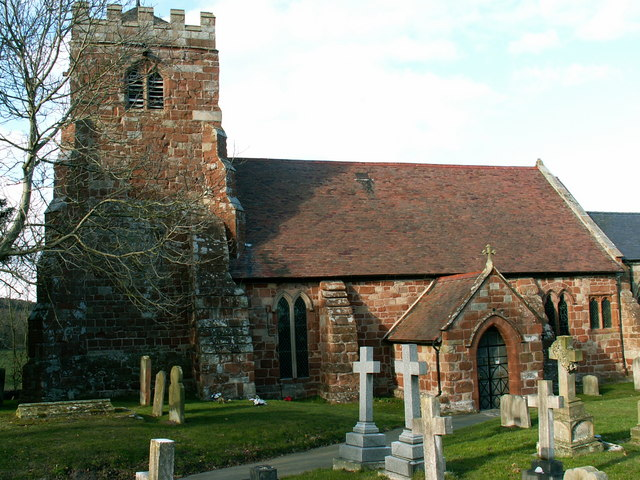
St Andrew's Church, Great Ness.

Ludlow's election as abbot received the royal assent on 21 August 1433. The mandate to restore the temporalities, issued on 5 September, and still more precise in its provisions, was addressed to the escheators for Shropshire, Staffordshire and Cambridgeshire, as well as the Chancellor at Lancaster.

Like Prestbury, he was one of the Benedictine graduates of Oxford: the notification of assent and the mandate call him a professor of theology (sacre pagine). Like his predecessor, he was soon given supervision of spending on Shrewsbury's fortifications: a fresh commission for this was issued on 16 November 1434. Another commission, issued to William Burley and other Shropshire notables only two days later, instituted an investigation into the expenditure, as it was alleged the bailiffs of the town had been converting it to their own uses: the investigators were ordered to question the abbot and to audit the accounts.

Ludlow oversaw two important property transfers and initiated another, all for pious purposes, and all clearly intended to show affection and support for the Lancastrian dynasty. In 1442 he agreed to grant the advowson of the parish church at Newport and of tithes in two villages of Edgmond to Thomas Draper, who promised in turn to establish a college of priests and a chantry in the abbey. This was for the souls of the king, Henry VI, of his uncle, Humphrey, Duke of Gloucester, and his father, Henry V. The Seinte Marie College of Newport was to consist of a warden and four other priests, of whom two would serve in the chantry. There was to be a guild of men and women in the chapel, whose souls were included in the prayers. On 1 October 1448 he and the convent granted important Cambridgeshire properties, in Isleham and Tadlow, to the College of St Mary and St Nicholas, Cambridge, a royal foundation intended to reflect Henry VI's piety and respect for scholarship. The king confirmed the grant in 1451. In 1449 Ludlow decided to press for appropriation of Great Ness church to fund Henry V's chantry in the chapel of St Winifred. On 31 October William Booth, then Bishop of Coventry and Lichfield, approved in writing the appropriation for the purpose of installing a single monk of the abbey as chantry priest, to say Mass daily for the souls of Henry V, Henry VI and their successors. The appropriation was also approved in the following year by other interested parties: John Verney, the Dean of Lichfield, Richard the prior of Coventry and Thomas Lye, the Archdeacon of Salop. However, papal approval remained to be won, and nothing was heard from that quarter before Ludlow's death.

Ludlow died in 1459, probably late in the year. By 15 December the king was exercising the abbey's rights of patronage to its churches because the temporalities had escheated to the Crown on the death of Ludlow. The next abbot was elected by January 1460.

== Thomas Mynde (1460–1498) ==
There is a fairly full contemporary account of Mynd's election. The monks involved are all named. The prior, charged with convening the house in the absence of an abbot, was Robert Ydeshale – presumably from Shifnal, then generally called Idshall. The monks met as a chapter on 19 December 1459 and decided on 8 January as election day. At the appointed time, they celebrated Mass together and then went to the chapter house, accompanied by the lawyer Radulph Makerell, who managed the election for them. They sang Veni Creator Spiritus and Brother Thomas Mynde, being a trained theologian, preached. The constitution was recited and explained by Dr Makerell. Then, the chapter reported,

suddenly and instantly, by the grace of the Holy Spirit, as we confidently believe, no previous treaty or act having occurred, but without interval, we the said prior and convent, with one voice, elected the aforesaid magnificent man, brother Thomas Mynde, bachelor of sacred theology, free and lawful, born of lawful matrimony, a man provident and discreet, commended by his knowledge of letters, his life and morals, constituted in the sacred order of priesthood, and of lawful age, well seen in spirituals and temporals, and able to defend and protect the rights of the said monastery, to be our abbot and pastor.

They carried Mynde in procession to the High Altar and returned to the chapter house to complete formalities, choosing the sub-prior Thomas Hyll and the third prior Wiliam Okys to take their decision to the king for the royal assent. However, these two proctors found Mynde in St Martin's chapel and were unable to win his consent. Only after half a day's consultation and consideration did he commit his agreement to writing. Royal assent for Mynde's election was notified to the bishop on 22 January 1460 from Westminster. It acknowledged that Mynde was a monk of the monastery and a bachelor of theology, so he was one of the Oxford graduates, funded by the abbey through its appropriation of Wrockwardine church. Mynde was confirmed as abbot on 1 February in Lichfield Cathedral by the bishop's vicar-general. The mandate for restoration of temporalities and writ to the tenants were issued on 4 February at Northampton. Thomas Mynde seems to have been another Shropshire abbot, possibly from landed gentry resident at Myndtown, near the Long Mynd.

The Wars of the Roses soon entered one of their most active phases and it was at Northampton that Henry VI fell into Yorkist hands on 10 July 1460. Embarrassingly, in 1463 Mynde received the long-awaited approval from Pope Pius II for Henry V's chantry. The wording, which referred to Henry VI as the current monarch, makes clear that it had been delayed for some years even after being written. As the country was now firmly under the rule of Edward IV, no further progress was made with the project for some years. Despite the abbey's consistent support for the Lancastrians, Thomas Mynde remained one of the local magnates that the Yorkist dynasty had to rely on for effective government. St John's Hospital was again reported to be in a poor state through the neglect and dishonesty of its officers. Mynde was commissioned in 1466 to investigate and rectify matters, with Thomas Littleton and Robert Eyton, the Sheriff. The warden at this time was John Bickley, a local man from Frankwell, and he seems to have clung on to office until at least 1480, despite the inquiry. When in 1479 the king needed someone to take fealty on his own behalf from a new prior of Wenlock, Mynde was ordered to do so, a clear expression of trust in him.

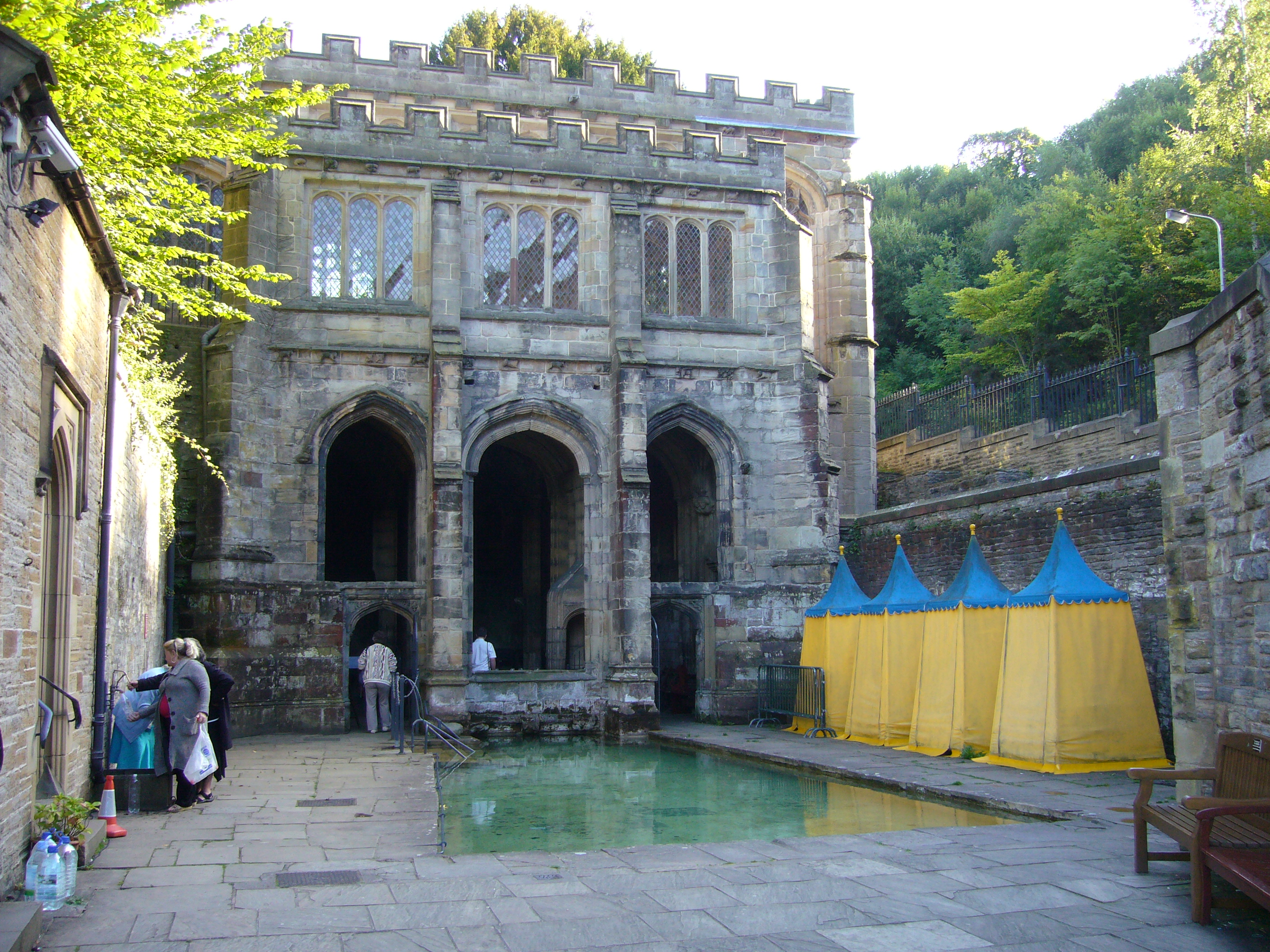
St Winefride's Well at Holywell, the shrine redeveloped by Margaret Beaufort, who had the chapel constructed.

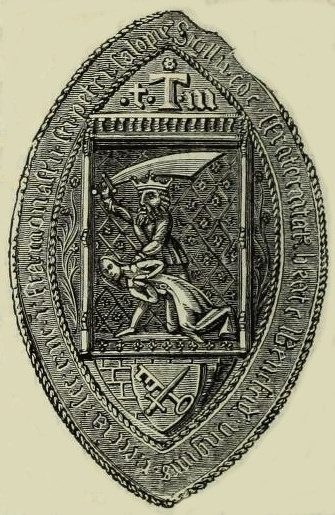
Seal of the guild of St Winifred, showing the decapitation of the saint.

With the accession of Henry VII, heir to the Lancastrian leadership and a Welshman, the abbey was once again in tune with the régime spiritually as well as politically. In 1485 the king's mother, Margaret Beaufort, Countess of Richmond and Derby, initiated the rebuilding of the Holywell shrine and William Caxton printed an English translation of Robert of Shrewsbury's life of St Winifred. The time was right for Mynde to make progress with the chantry of Henry V. On 9 February 1487 Henry VII licensed the formation of a guild of lay men and women to serve in the shrine, authorising them to acquire properties in mortmain to the value of £10 annually. They were to pray for the good estate of the king, Elizabeth of York, his queen, and of Abbot Mynde. Despite the obvious sympathy of the royal family for the project, it appears that Mynde paid a very large sum for the licence. Mynde founded the guild on 1 March. Four clerics were accepted into the guild: Adam Grafton, the rector of Battlefield Church, the prior and sub-prior of the abbey and Thomas Morris, the vicar of Holy Cross, the parish church within the abbey. Two chaplains were to say mass at the altar of St Winifred. The lay membership was immediately filled it with notables of the surrounding area: twelve prominent merchants and gentry, of whom eleven were accompanied into the guild by their wives. It was ordained that each deceased member of the guild should have a requiem mass, with the poorest specifically instructed to turn to face the congregation and to pray in English: a clear sign of lay demands for greater participation in worship. Shortly after its formation, the members of the guild, brothers and sisters, elected Alan Stury as their warden and were granted some meadowland towards their maintenance by the abbey.

Mynde almost certainly died later that same year, 1497. Sources which give 1498 cite the Patent Rolls for the period. The relevant entry shows that Henry VII granted the abbey a licence for the election of a new abbot on 2 January 1498, which would allow only one day for the convent to bury Mynde and inform the king: implausible, as the licence was issued at Knole House in Kent, home of the king's friend and financial manipulator Cardinal Morton.

== Richard Lye (1498 – 1512) ==
Richard Lye was probably elected soon afterwards, as he was confirmed as abbot by the bishop on 16 March 1498. However, there was then some unexplained problem with the abbey's property. Not until 20 January 1499 was the mandate issued to restore the temporalities, along with the writ de intendendo, demanding recognition of Lye as landlord. The king made an unusual grant to him on 4 February 1498, restoring all the rents and revenues that had fallen into royal hands during the vacancy. It appears that the notoriously avaricious government of Henry VII had found some way of prolonging the vacancy to increase its own revenues. Lye's epitaph refers to the effort, expense and work he had put into restoring the abbey's liberties. If the epitaph alludes to this episode at the outset of his abbacy, the king's grant was probably bought at very considerable expense.

Richard Lye was son of Lodovic Lye, who lived near the Abbey, and possibly related to Richard Lye, vicar of Holy Cross for two days in 1430, before settling for the abbey's church at Edgmond. Lye is a variant form of the name Lee or Leigh, from the dative case of the Old English word for a meadow. The name appears several times in the Late Middle Ages in the Shrewsbury Burgess Roll but then peters out, while Lee and Lea predominate. The name Lye occurs often in the ecclesiastical history of Shropshire: Archdeacon Thomas Lye was a prominent supporter of Abbot Thomas Ludlow's attempt to appropriate Great Ness church for Henry V's chantry. More recently, Hugh Lye of Lye had failed to answer a summons concerning a debt of £10 13s. 4d. to Thomas Mynde in 1480. Another Richard Lye and his wife, Beatrice, were among the founding members of the Guild of St Winifred in 1487: his name does not appear on the Burgess Roll and he was probably a citizen of Abbey Foregate, then a separate borough. The monk Richard Lye is known before his election as one of those who signed the Abbey's grant of two pastures to the Guild. He is recorded at Oxford as a student in 1496: his epitaph gives him the title Dominus, Master, suggesting an academic qualification.

Lye made full use of the abbey's property to express generosity to his own family. His father Lodovic was granted a pasture called Judas Butts, which was to revert after his death to Joan, Richard's sister. On 25 October 1508 Joan and her husband John Copland were granted for the term of her life a large weekly ration of bread and ale, together with an annual allowance of twelve large wagon-loads of wood from the Lythwood. They were also to receive tithes of corn and hay from abbatial lands in Baschurch and Stanwardine. They were given a corner house near the abbey to live in, a shop on the bridge for Copland's business, a second house nearby in Coleham, and pasture land. All this was allegedly granted by the abbot and convent together.

Richard Lye died in London while on parliamentary business on 4 March 1512 and was buried at St Bartholomew-the-Less in Smithfield. In part, his epitaph read:

| Latin | English |
|---|---|
| HIC JACET DOMINUS RICHARDUS LYE QUONDAM ABBAS SALOPIE, QUI SUA INDUSTRIA, SUMPTIBUS MAGNIS, ET SUIS LABORIBUS, DEO SUADENTE RECUPERAVIT LIBERTATES SUE ECCLESIE SALOPIE PREDICTE, ET POSTEA OBIIT 4^{to} DIE MARTII TEMPORE PARLIAMENTI ANNO DOMINI 1512 CUJUS, &C. | Here lies Master Richard Lye, former Abbot of Shrewsbury, who by his efforts, great expenditures and his work, persuading through God, recovered the liberties belonging to his church at Shrewsbury, and afterwards died on 4 March in the time of Parliament, A.D. 1512... |

Two monks, Prior William Castle and Laurence Greenleaf, submitted a petition for a licence to elect a new abbot on 11 March and it was issued at Westminster on behalf of Henry VIII on 23 March.

== Richard Baker alias Marshall (1512–1528) ==
Richard Baker was elected abbot. He was also known by the surname Marciale or Marshall. The king was petitioned for assent on 9 April 1512 and it was notified on 28 April. The temporalities were restored under a mandate of 24 May. The following month Henry VIII ordered a pension for a cleric, William Dingley, which the abbot was bound to give him until he could be found a suitable position in one of the abbey's churches. This was an obligation on newly elected abbots since the 14th century: pensions and corrodies were a major and probably increasing burden on monastic finances. In November 1514 Baker was summoned, as abbot, to attend the 1515 Parliament.

Episcopal visitations from the time of Baker present an unhappy picture of a divided and embittered community, struggling with unpaid debts, poor accounting, buildings in decay and land leased without consulting the chapter: The monks had never been consulted about Lye's grants to his family, which had been made nominally on behalf of abbot with the convent. The infirmary was in ruins and Thomas Butler, the subprior, had taken away its glass to improve the comfort of his own room. Added to internal problems, a boundary dispute blew up between the abbey and the town of Shrewsbury. Possibly Baker felt out of his depth. He resigned the abbacy in December 1528 and in the following year became prior of Morville Priory, the abbey's small cell near Bridgnorth. It seems unlikely that he was old on retirement from the abbacy, as he lived to surrender Morville Priory at the dissolution in 1540 and then lived another 18 years at Bridgnorth. His pension of £40 was paid partly from the revenues of Morville Priory, which was granted to him for life in 1540. He was buried in St Leonard's Church, Bridgnorth on 7 May 1558.

== Thomas Boteler or Butler (1529 – 1540) ==
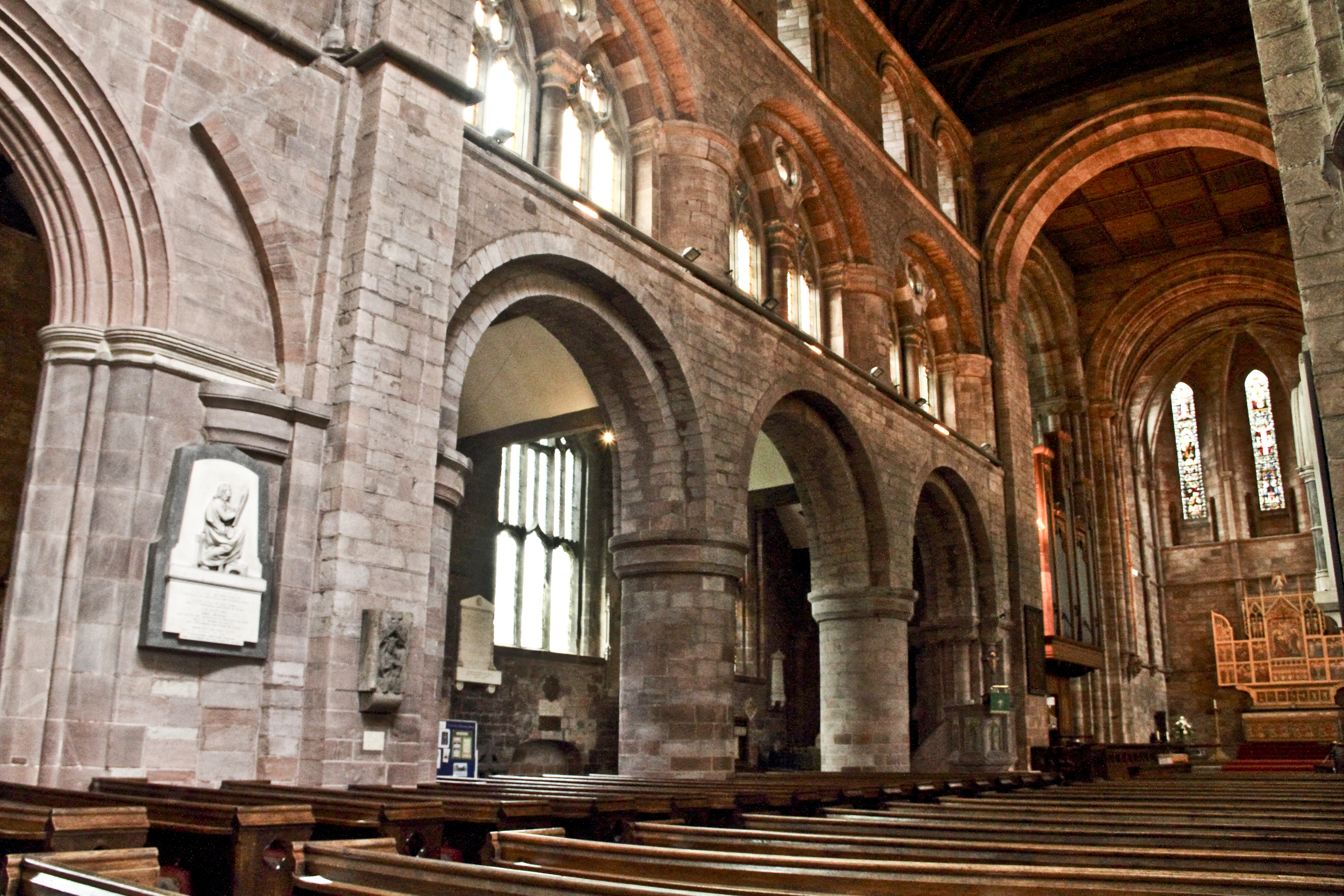
Shrewsbury Abbey interior today.

Thomas Boteler or Botelar (Butler in modern spelling) was the subprior who stole the infirmary windows for his own use and had become prior of the abbey by the resignation of Baker, after which he and Thomas Leche were the monks who obtained a licence for an election, issued at Richmond Palace on 13 January 1529. It was not until 28 July that Henry VIII gave his assent to Boteler's election.

The political climate in which monasteries existed had long been worsening. As early as 1524–5, Thomas Wolsey had been allowed to sweep away 21 houses to fund study at a new institution at Oxford, which he proposed to nameCardinal College: disturbingly, one of those dissolved was Sandwell Priory, long but vainly coveted by the abbots of Shrewsbury. The Valor Ecclesiasticus of 1535, assessed Shrewsbury Abbey's income at £527 15s. 5¾. Of this, £414 1s. 3¼d. Was contributed by the temporalities: essentially, property rents drawn from estates in 26 manors of Shropshire and seven of other counties. When the Dissolution of the Monasteries began in earnest in the following year, Shrewsbury was initially out of danger as its income was well above the threshold of £200. However, agitation against the larger houses was being orchestrated by Thomas Cromwell. One of the letters received in January 1536 contained a comprehensive denunciation of governance and standards at Shrewsbury under Boteler.

Articles against the abbot of Shrewsbury accused by Thos. Madockes, of London, merchant tailor, of having "misused the foundation of his monastery contrary to his Grace's last injunctions."

1. No infirmary for sick men kept; nor hostry; nor days of hall. 2. A certain parsonage named Rokerdyne, should be for maintaining a scholar at Oxford, which he never did. 3. The parsonage of Nes was given for a priest to sing for king Henry V., but he never kept one. 4. No inventory or accounts made since he was abbot. 5. The roof over the high altar is gradually falling to pieces. 6. The convent sit wet in the choir when it rains. 7. No one except his confederacy dare speak in support of the rule. 8. Eighty or 100 seals have passed through his means, whereof the convent cannot know the fine, but it is by estimation 800 or 900 marks. 9. A chalice alienated. 10. The convent had 2s. a week for St. Katharine's mass, but now only 12d. 11. Withholding from the Chamber certain lands which should find books, and now there is not a whole book in the choir. 12. Has proved that he came in by simony. 13. He pulls down the house daily to the bare ground, never to be rebuilded, and whether he would have sold the timber, tile, and stuff, no one can tell. 16. The word of God was never preached there since he was abbot.

A monk had earlier described Boteler as "a most envious and factious man," and it seems he was a divisive figure. The following month Rowland Lee, a tough administrator who was both Bishop of Coventry and Lichfield and President of the Council of Wales and the Marches, was pleading for a little latitude for Boteler, as he was suffering from a palsy. In June he was said to be unable to attend Parliament because of his sickness. The plague was raging in Shrewsbury at the time, so there were difficulties with Parliamentary elections for Shropshire too, but it seems likely that Boteler was, like his predecessor, under great personal strain.

The Dissolution came slowly but inexorably. Legislation in 1539 was formally only permissive, making arrangements for receiving on the king's behalf any monasteries "which hereafter shall happen to be dissolved, suppressed, renounced, relinquished, forfeited, given up, or by any other means come to King's Highness." However, there was never any doubt that they would be forced into surrender. When Shrewsbury Abbey was dissolved on 24 January 1540, a pension of £80 was assigned to Boteler. The 17 other monks also received pensions, but none on such a scale: Thomas Wenlock, the prior, on just £10 came closest. The senior monks received £5-6 each and the younger monks a mere £1 6s. 8d. It was thought that after the dissolution of his abbey, Boteler became the vicar of Much Wenlock who kept an interesting register, with many references to contemporary events. This is now generally discounted, as the vicar is known to have been inducted as far back as 1524. Owen and Blakeway thought that, like Baker, he retired to Bridgnorth.

== Bibliography ==
Michael Webb, The Abbots of Shrewsbury Abbey 1992 (Second edition), produced and sold in aid of Shrewsbury Abbey Restoration Project.
