= Francis Pott =

Francis Pott may refer to:

- Francis Lister Hawks Pott (1864–1947), president of St. John's University, Shanghai
- Francis Pott (hymnwriter) (1832–1909), English Anglican priest and author of Christian hymns
- Francis Pott (composer) (born 1957), British composer

== See also ==
- Francis Potter (1594–1678), English painter, clergyman, Biblical commentator, and experimentalist
