= The Parade Shopping Centre =

Historic site in Shrewsbury, Shropshire, England

The Parade Shops
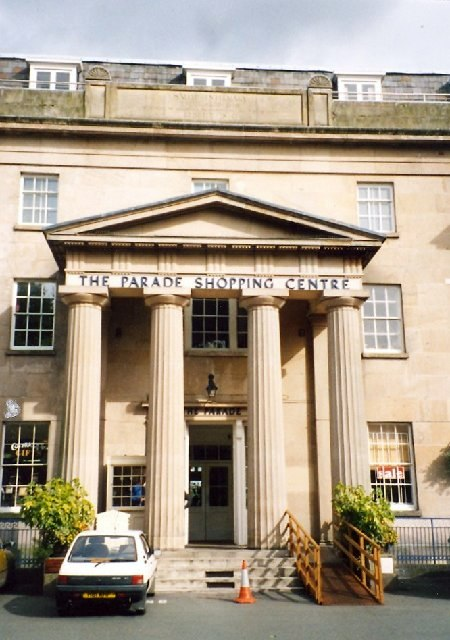

- Location within Shropshire
- 52.7085°N 2.7507°W
- Location: Shrewsbury

History
- Built: 1830

Site notes
- Architect(s): Edward Haycock and Sir Robert Smirke
- Website: www.paradeshops.co.uk

Listed Building – Grade II
- Designated: 30 May 1969
- Reference no.: 1254655

The Parade Shops, formerly the Royal Salop Infirmary, is a specialist shopping centre at St Mary's Place in Shrewsbury, Shropshire, England. It is a Grade II listed building.

== History ==
The original facility on the site was the Salop Infirmary designed by William Baker of Audlem and completed in 1745, converting a mansion named Broom Hall which had been a local house of Corbet Kynaston.

The infirmary was completely rebuilt to a design by Edward Haycock, with occasional inspections by Sir Robert Smirke, in the Greek Revival style in 1830. An additional wing was completed in 1870 and it was renamed the Royal Salop Infirmary in 1914, after a visit by King George V. A further wing, with beds for 8 maternity cases and 22 children was begun in 1925 and completed in 1927.

It joined the National Health Service in 1948. The hospital was closed, after structural difficulties were experienced, on 20 November 1977. After services transferred to the Royal Shrewsbury Hospital by 1979, the Royal Salop Infirmary buildings were acquired by a developer who converted it into a shopping centre in the early 1980s.

== Notable staff of Royal Salop Infirmary ==
- Job Orton, dissenting minister, was first board secretary of the infirmary in 1745-47.
- William Farr, statistician, was originally employed as a dresser (surgeon's assistant) there in 1826.
- Thomas Bucknall Lloyd, later Archdeacon of Salop, had been hospital chaplain.
- Charles Maude, later Archdeacon of Salop, was appointed hospital chaplain in 1901.
