= St Peter's Church, Edgmond =

Coordinates: 52.7705°N 2.4161°W

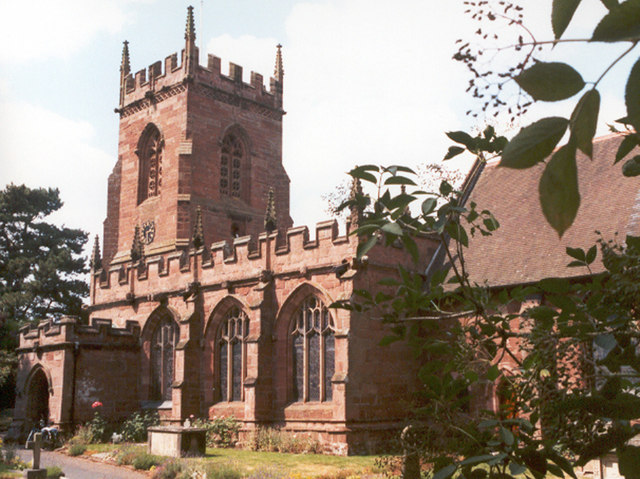
- St Peter's Church, Edgmond, from the southeast

- Location in Shropshire
- OS grid reference: SJ 720 193
- Location: Edgmond, Shropshire
- Country: England
- Denomination: Anglican
- Churchmanship: Modern Catholic
- Website: stpeterschurchedgmond.org

History
- Status: Parish church

Architecture
- Functional status: Active
- Heritage designation: Grade I
- Designated: 18 June 1959
- Architect: G. E. Street (restoration)
- Architectural type: Church
- Style: Gothic

Specifications
- Materials: Sandstone

Administration
- Province: Canterbury
- Diocese: Lichfield
- Archdeaconry: Salop
- Deanery: Edgmond and Shifnal
- Parish: Edgmond

Clergy
- Rector: Revd Prebendary Helen Morby

St. Peter's Church is in the village of Edgmond, Shropshire, England. The church is an active Anglican parish church in the deanery of Edgmond and Shifnal, the archdeaconry of Salop, and the diocese of Lichfield. Its benefice is united with those of St Chad, Kynnersley, and St Lawrence, Preston upon the Weald Moors. The church is recorded in the National Heritage List for England as a designated Grade I listed building.

== History ==
St. Peter's dates from 1080. It was enlarged in the 13th century, and almost completely rebuilt during the following two centuries, re-using some 13th-century material. The church was restored in 1877–78 by G. E. Street. The restoration included adding the steeply pitched roof to the chancel, which involved reducing the height of the side walls to increase its pitch.

== Architecture ==
=== Exterior ===
The church is constructed in sandstone. Its plan consists of a nave with north and south aisles, a south porch, a chancel, and a west tower. The architectural style of the chancel is Decorated, and the rest of the church is in Perpendicular style. The tower is in three stages, with a four-light west window. It has diagonal buttresses, two-light bell openings, and a quatrefoil frieze. The parapet is embattled with crocketed corner pinnacles. The south aisle also has an embattled parapet with crocketed pinnacles, and also has grotesque gargoyles, and three-light windows. The windows along the sides of the north aisle have two lights. The chancel has a three-light east window, and two-light north and south windows. The south porch is also embattled, and has an 18th-century painted sundial on its wall.

=== Interior ===
Inside the church are four-bay arcades carried on octagonal piers. In the south aisle is a trefoil-headed piscina. The tub-shaped font is early Norman in style. The stone reredos dates from 1899, was designed by Bodley and Garner, and depicts the Crucifixion and saints. The stained glass includes a window in the nave containing fragments of 15th-century glass, and armorial panels from the 18th century. The east window contains stained glass dating from 1891 by Kempe depicting the Annunciation. In the south wall of the chancel is a window of 1876 by Morris and Company, and elsewhere are windows by Hardman dating from between 1879 and 1899. The monuments include part of a 15th-century incised slab, and a brass from the 16th century. Either side of the chancel arch are wooden panels listing parish men who died serving in World War II, presented by members of the congregation while the parishioners are recorded to have given the wooden pulpit as part of the memorial.

The two-manual pipe organ was built in the 1860s by Nicholson and Lord, and moved here in 1885. Pneumatic action was added in 1937 by Rushworth and Dreaper, and further modifications, including replacing the pneumatic action with mechanical action, have been made since 1999 by P. D. Collins. There is a ring of eight bells. Four of these were cast in 1721 by Abraham Rudhall II, and the other four by John Taylor and Co, one in 1887, one in 1957, and the final two in 1977.

== External features ==
The churchyard contains the war grave of a Royal Garrison Artillery soldier of World War I.

== See also ==
- Grade I listed churches in Shropshire
- Listed buildings in Edgmond
