= Listed buildings in Edgmond =

Edgmond is a civil parish in the district of Telford and Wrekin, Shropshire, England. It contains 24 listed buildings that are recorded in the National Heritage List for England. Of these, one is listed at Grade I, the highest of the three grades, two are at Grade II*, the middle grade, and the others are at Grade II, the lowest grade. The parish contains the village of Edgmond and the surrounding countryside. Most of the listed buildings are houses and associated structures, farm houses and farm buildings. The other listed buildings include a church, a former water mill, and a war memorial.

== Key ==
Grade	Criteria
I	Buildings of exceptional interest, sometimes considered to be internationally important
II*	Particularly important buildings of more than special interest
II	Buildings of national importance and special interest

== Buildings ==
Name and location	Photograph	Date	Notes	Grade
St Peter's Church; 52.77047°N 2.41606°W		c. 1100	The church was enlarged in the 13th century, it was virtually rebuilt later, and restored in 1877–78 by G. E. Street. It is built in sandstone, and consists of a west tower, a nave, north and south aisles and a south porch in Perpendicular style, and a chancel in Decorated style. The tower has three stages, diagonal buttresses, a quatrefoil frieze, and an embattled parapet with corner crocketed pinnacles. The south aisle is embattled, and has crocketed pinnacles, and grotesque gargoyles. On the porch is a painted sundial.	I
Provost's House; 52.76978°N 2.41686°W	—	Early 14th century	The house was extended in the 18th and 19th centuries and in 1906. The original part is in stone with a slate roof and an embattled gable. It has two storeys and an attic, and a two-storey gabled porch with a doorway that has a moulded surround. The windows are mullioned and transomed. The 18th-century part is in brick with an embattled parapet and a tile roof. It has two storeys and four bays, and contains sash windows with segmental arched openings and keyblocks. The 19th-century extension to the east is in brick, and the 20th-century addition to the north is in timber framing and brick.	II*
Crossbeam; 52.77060°N 2.41711°W	—	16th or 17th century	A timber framed house with brick infill, one storey and an attic, and an L-shaped plan. The south wing has a thatched roof, and the north wing has been rebuilt with a tile roof. Most of the windows are casements, and there are gabled dormers with hipped roofs.	II
Gatehouse, former Caynton Manor; 52.78921°N 2.45392°W	—	c. 1635	The gatehouse to the former manor house is in red brick on a red sandstone plinth, with dressings in red sandstone, a cabled fluted frieze above the ground floor, a moulded eaves cornice and a tile roof. There are two storeys, a central passageway and two windows in each floor. The arches of the passageway have keystones, voussoirs, moulded imposts, and jambs with recessed panels, and the windows are mullioned and transomed.	II*
30 High Street and 1 Turners Lane; 52.77125°N 2.41421°W	—	17th century	A pair of timber framed cottages with brick infill on a sandstone plinth, and with a tile roof. There are two storeys and three bays, and the windows are casements.	II
Standford Hall; 52.80124°N 2.43233°W	—	17th century	The oldest part is the south wing, with the north wing added at right angles in the 18th century. The house is in brick and has a tile roof, gabled at the north, and hipped at the south. The north wing has two storeys and an attic, and nine bays. There is a central segmental-arched doorway with a fanlight, and five gabled dormers. The south wing has two storeys, five bays, a string course, a bay window, and a porch. The windows in both wings are sashes.	II
Sunnyside; 52.77228°N 2.41192°W		17th century (probable)	A cottage, probably with a timber framed core, encased in brick, with a dentil eaves cornice and a tile roof. It has one storey and an attic, and three bays. In the centre is a bay window and porch, the windows are casements, and there is a small gabled dormer.	II
Outbuilding northwest of Sunnyside; 52.77234°N 2.41230°W	—	17th century (probable)	A timber framed building with cruck construction. It has two bays, the left bay replaced in brick in the 19th century, the right bay with red brick nogging, partly weatherboarded, on a sandstone plinth. The roof is tiled, and inside is a central cruck truss.	II
The Haven; 52.77041°N 2.41256°W	—	17th century	A timber framed cottage with brick infill and a tile roof. It has one storey and an attic, and three bays. There is a gabled porch, casement windows, and three gabled dormers.	II
The Priory; 52.77383°N 2.40893°W	—	17th century or earlier	A timber framed house that was remodelled in the 19th century, encased in brick, and roughcast. It has dentil eaves and a tile roof, two storeys and three bays. On the front is a gabled porch, to the left is a sash window, and the other windows are casements.	II
Two Trees; 52.77217°N 2.41156°W	—	17th century	A timber framed cottage, the front encased in brick in the 19th century, with a tile roof. It has one storey and an attic, two bays, and a single-storey timber framed wing to the right. In the centre is a gabled porch and a doorway with a four-centred arch. The windows are casements, and there are two gabled dormers with finials.	II
Old Caynton Manor House; 52.78930°N 2.45450°W		18th century	The house was later extended and heightened. It is in brick with string courses, and a slate roof with parapet gable ends. There are three storeys, five bays, and a rear wing. In the centre is a splayed bay window, to the right is a doorway with a fanlight, and the windows are sashes.	II
Stables, Standford Hall; 52.80114°N 2.43262°W	—	18th century	The stables are in red brick with dentil eaves, partly with a string course, and a hipped tile roof. There are two storeys, with stable doors in the ground floor, and in the upper floor is a three-light casement window with a segmental arch, and a blocked window.	II
The Manor House; 52.77182°N 2.41390°W	—	18th century	A red brick house with a moulded eaves cornice, and a tile roof with stepped gable ends. There are two storeys and an attic, a front of three bays, and a rear wing of four bays. On the front are large canted bay windows, above which is a canopy continued over a central doorway with a moulded architrave and a pediment. The windows are sashes in segmental arches, and there are gabled dormers, those on the front with panelled aprons.	II
Caynton House; 52.79383°N 2.43899°W	—	c. 1800	A brick house with stone dressings, a cornice and blocking course, and a slate roof. The main block has three storeys and five bays, the central bay slightly recessed, and there are flanking recessed two-storey one-bay wings. The central doorway has pairs of Ionic pilasters, and a segmental traceried fanlight, and the windows are sashes.	II
Barn southeast of Caynton House; 52.79336°N 2.43842°W	—	Late 18th or early 19th century	The barn is in red brick with a tiled roof and a small wing. It contains two segmental arched cart entrances, a loft door in a gable end, and ventilation holes.	II
Buttery Farmhouse; 52.74991°N 2.46240°W	—	1810	The farmhouse is in red brick with a hipped slate roof. There are three storeys and three bays. The central doorway has pilasters, a rectangular fanlight, and a pediment. The windows are sashes with segmental heads. Above the central window in the upper floor is an initialled and dated tablet.	II
Edgmond Hall; 52.76905°N 2.41513°W	—	Early 19th century	A red brick house with dentil eaves and hipped tile roofs. It has three storeys, three bays, and flanking two-storey single-bay wings. In the ground floor is a porch and canted bay windows, and above the windows are sashes with voussoired lintels and fluted keyblocks.	II
Egremont House; 52.77380°N 2.41152°W	—	Early 19th century	A red brick house with a tile roof, three storeys and three bays. In the centre is an ornate openwork cast iron porch with a tent-shaped roof, and a doorway with a rectangular fanlight. The windows are sashes with segmental heads.	II
Garden wall, Old Caynton Manor House; 52.78943°N 2.45449°W	—	Early 19th century	The wall encloses the garden to the north of the house. It is in red brick with sandstone coping, and has piers with cap stones.	II
Old Caynton Mill; 52.78891°N 2.45698°W		Early 19th century	A former water mill on the River Meese that has been converted into a house. It is in red brick with dentil eaves and a tile roof. There are three storeys and five bays. The windows are modern, in segmental arched openings, and the loft door has been converted into a window.	II
Cottage and garage range, Provost's House; 52.76988°N 2.41656°W	—	Early 19th century	Outbuildings in sandstone, the rear rebuilt in brick, with a moulded embattled parapet, and a tiled roof with gabled ends. It has two storeys and a single-storey range to the left. The building contains windows and a doorway with pointed arches.	II
The White House; 52.77364°N 2.39356°W	—	Early to mid 19th century	A stuccoed house with a string course, giant pilasters, moulded eaves, and a hipped slate roof. There are two storeys, a garden front with four bays, and an entrance front of two bays. The porch has pilasters and an entablature, and the windows are sashes, in the upper floor with pilasters, and in the ground floor with moulded hoods on console brackets. At the rear are lower two-storey wings, and a small tower with a pyramidal roof.	II
War memorial 52.77152°N 2.41375°W	—	1920	The war memorial is sited at a road junction, and is in sandstone. It has a four-stepped octagonal base and a hexagonal tapering shaft, on which is a lantern cross. This has a pediment under which are carvings of Jesus on the Cross, flanked by a nurse and a soldier, and below it are two inscribed cornices. On the base are inscriptions and the names of those lost in the World Wars.	II
