= Thomas Gilbert (minister) =

English ejected minister

Thomas Gilbert (1613–15 July 1694) was an English ejected minister of the seventeenth century.

== Biography ==
Thomas Gilbert, son of William Gilbert of Prees, Shropshire, was born in 1613. In 1629 he became a student in St Edmund Hall, Oxford, his tutor being Ralph Morhall. After graduating B.A. on 28 May 1633, he obtained some employment in Ireland, but returned to Oxford and graduated M.A. on 7 November 1638. Through the favour of Philip, fourth baron Wharton, he obtained the vicarage of Upper Winchendon, Buckinghamshire, and (about 1644) the vicarage of St Laurence's Church, Reading, Berkshire, when he took the covenant.

He sided with the Independents, according to Tanner (a statement which seems questionable, according to the Dictionary of National Biography), and was created B.D. on 19 May 1648 at the parliamentary visitation of Oxford. About the same time he exchanged his cure at Reading for the rectory of Edgmond, Shropshire. Tanner says he was appointed in the room of an ejected royalist, but of this there is no record in Walker. He gained great influence, and was nicknamed the ‘bishop of Shropshire.’ In 1654 he was made assistant to the commissioners for ejecting insufficient ministers in Shropshire, Middlesex, and Westminster. Peck prints a letter (28 August 1658) from Gilbert to Henry Scobell. At the Restoration he lost the rectory of Edgmond, and he was ejected from Winchendon by the Act of Uniformity 1662. Hereupon he retired to Oxford, where he and his wife lived quietly in St Ebbe's parish. He is said by Edmund Calamy to have been the means of keeping Robert South from becoming an Arminian. He still preached frequently in the family of Lord Wharton and in other private houses. On the issue of Charles II's Royal Declaration of Indulgence (15 March 1672) Gilbert joined with three ejected Presbyterians in gathering a congregation at a house ‘in Thames Street, without the north gate.’ This did not last long, as the indulgence was quashed in the following year, replaced by the Test Act.

=== Later years ===
Gilbert did not again take charge of a congregation. He was badly off in his later years, ‘his children having drained him,’ and was assisted by private friends, including several heads of colleges. He was deeply versed in school divinity, and a better Latin than English poet. Anthony Wood calls him ‘the common epitaph-maker for dissenters;’ Calamy says he wrote but three, for Thomas Goodwin, D.D., John Owen, D.D., and Ichabod Chauncey. When Calamy was at Oxford (1691–2), he found Gilbert regularly attending the ministry of John Hall (1633–1710), bishop of Bristol and master of Pembroke, for one of the Sunday services, and for the other that of Joshua Oldfield at the Presbyterian meeting, an example followed by other Oxford dissenters. He was on intimate terms with Hall, Ralph Bathurst, master of Trinity, Aldrich, Wallis, and Jane. Calamy describes him as ‘very purblind,’ as ‘the completest schoolman’ he ever knew, in his element among ‘crabbed writers,’ yet sometimes ‘very facetious and pleasant in conversation.’ Calamy has preserved some of his stories, told after a supper of ‘buttered onions.’ Gilbert died at Oxford on 15 July 1694, and was buried in the chancel of St Aldate's Church.

=== Publications ===
He published:

1. Vindiciæ supremi Dei Dominii … oppositæ nuper Doct. Audoeni Diatribæ de Justitia, 1655, (disputes the necessity of satisfaction, against Owen).
2. An Assize Sermon at Bridgnorth (James ii. 12), 1657
3. Julius Secundus, Oxford, 1669, (preface, assigning this dialogue to Erasmus); 2nd edit., Oxford, 1680, (with addition of Jani Alex. Ferrarii Euclides Catholicus).
4. England's Passing-Bell, a Poem, 1675, (commemorates the plague, the great fire, and the Dutch war).
5. Super auspicatissimo regis Gulielmi in Hiberniam descensu … carmen, 1690.

Probably posthumous was 6. A Learned and Accurate Discourse concerning the Guilt of Sin, 1695, though Calamy speaks as if it had been first printed in Gilbert's lifetime. It was written before 1678 and reprinted, 1708, from Gilbert's manuscript; again reprinted, Edinburgh, 1720. It teaches that pardon covers future as well as existing sin. He had a hand in the Annus Mirabilis for 1661 and following years, and wrote the largest part of a Latin version (Amsterdam, 1677) of Francis Potter's Interpretation of the Number 666 Oxford, 1642.
