= Thomas Lloyd (priest, born 1824) =

Thomas Bucknall Lloyd (23 May 1824 - 25 February 1896) was Archdeacon of Salop from 1886 until his death.

Lloyd was the maternal grandson of Samuel Butler, Bishop of Lichfield. He was born at Shrewsbury, eldest son of John Thomas Lloyd of The Stone House, Shrewsbury, and his wife Harriet, Butler's daughter.

Lloyd was educated at Shrewsbury and St John's College, Cambridge, graduating with a B.A. in 1846 and M.A. in 1849. While at Cambridge he was the Cox in the 1846 Boat Race; and was awarded a blue.

He was ordained deacon by the Bishop of Lichfield in 1848 and priest in 1849 and began his career with a curacy at Lilleshall, Shropshire. He was the Vicar of Meole Brace from 1851 to 1854; Vicar of St Mary, Shrewsbury and town preacher of Shrewsbury until 1888; and Rector of Edgmond, Shropshire until his death. He was Prebendary of Freeford in Lichfield Cathedral from 1870, Rural Dean of Shrewsbury 1873–87, Chaplain of Berwick near Shrewsbury in 1876–77, and Proctor of the Diocese of Lichfield in 1885–86.

He was chaplain to the 1st Shropshire Rifle Volunteers, first chairman of the Shrewsbury Schools Board, chairman of the governors of Shrewsbury School, vice-president of the Shrewsbury School of Science and Art, Chaplain to the Salop Infirmary, member of the council of Lichfield Theological College, and vice-president of the Church Mission for the Deaf and Dumb.

He married, on 21 August 1849, Sophia Elizabeth (died 1858), eldest daughter of the Reverend Percival Spearman Wilkinson of Mount Oswald, County Durham. By her he had one son and four daughters.

The novelist Samuel Butler was Lloyd's own cousin. In 1857 Lloyd purchased from the latter the mansion of Whitehall in Abbey Foregate, Shrewsbury.

Lloyd died aged 71 at Edgmond rectory, of pneumonia, in February 1896, and was buried on 29 February at the General Cemetery in Longden Road, Shrewsbury, after a funeral service at St Mary's Church in the same town.
