= Francis Potter =

English painter

Francis Potter (1594–1678) was an English painter, clergyman, Biblical commentator, and experimentalist, and an early Fellow of the Royal Society.

== Life ==
Francis Potter was the second son of Richard Potter (died 1628), prebendary of Worcester, and his wife, who belonged to the Horsey family of Clifton, Dorset. He was born at Mere vicarage on 29 May 1594, and educated at the King's School, Worcester. In 1609 he went up as a commoner to Trinity College, Oxford where his elder brother Hannibal was a scholar; he graduated B.A. in 1613, and M.A. in 1616. In 1625 he proceeded B.D., and, after his father's death in 1628, succeeded him as rector of Kilmington, Wiltshire, although he did not at first reside there.

He escaped sequestration during the English Civil War and Interregnum. He was admitted a Fellow of Royal Society on 11 November 1663, soon after its foundation. Nearly blind, he died unmarried in April 1678, and was buried in the chancel at Kilmington. His friend John Aubrey describes him as "like a monk", and as "pretty long visaged, and pale clear skin, gray eie".

== Works ==
Potter formed a theory of the Number of the Beast, connecting 25, the approximate square root of 666, with Catholic institutions; he elaborated it in a manuscript which was read in 1637 by Joseph Mead, who commended it as a wonderful discovery to Samuel Hartlib. It was published as An Interpretation of the Number 666 (Oxford, by Leonard Lichfield, 1642), with a symbolical frontispiece, an opinion by Mead prefixed, and a preface dated from Kilmington. Anthony Wood says it was translated into French, Dutch, and Latin; but the only translation extant is in Latin, printed in a small octavo at Amsterdam in 1677, and attributed to Thomas Gilbert. It was reprinted at Worcester in 1808.

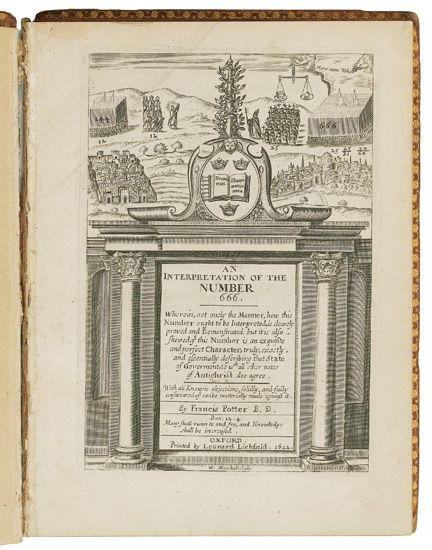
Title page of An Interpretation of the Number 666 (1642)

Potter was following a line of thought in Patrick Forbes, Richard Bernard, and Mead. His work continued to have significance for over a century.

== Experimenter ==
Potter made quadrants with a graduated compass of his own invention, which he gave to Aubrey. He experimented with bees, and showed Aubrey their thighs in a microscope. He also theorised about blood transfusion (about 1640), and later communicated his results through Aubrey to the Royal Society. It has been suggested that Potter's priority in practical work on blood transfusion, as hinted by Timothy Clarke, is more significant than has been admitted in the past.

He made a sundial on the north side of the original quadrangle of Trinity College. He also drew and painted; and Aubrey says that he designed an instrument for drawing in perspective, which was afterwards re-invented by Christopher Wren. He was fond of chess, which he played with his contemporary at Trinity, Colonel Bishop.

== Notes ==
Attribution

This article incorporates text from a publication now in the public domain: "Potter, Francis". Dictionary of National Biography. London: Smith, Elder & Co. 1885–1900.
