= Edgmond =

Village in England

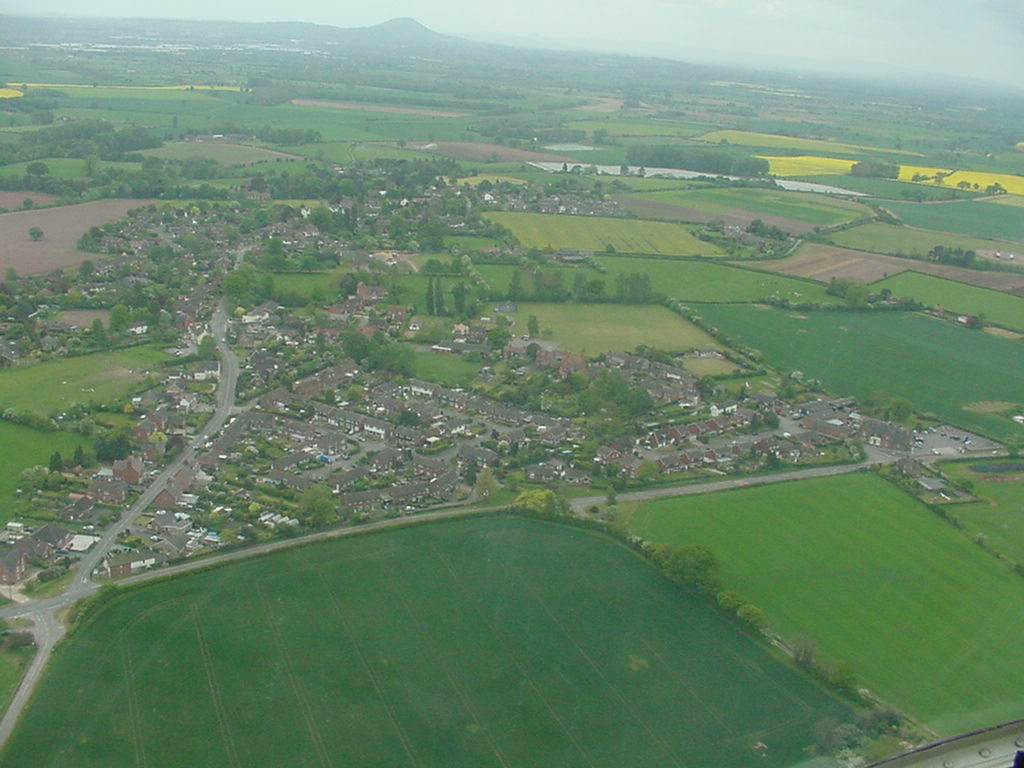
- Edgmond from helicopter. The Wrekin on the horizon

- Location within Shropshire
- Population: 2,062 (2011)
- OS grid reference: SJ722194
- Civil parish: Edgmond
- Unitary authority: Telford and Wrekin
- Ceremonial county: Shropshire
- Region: West Midlands
- Country: England
- Sovereign state: United Kingdom
- Post town: NEWPORT
- Postcode district: TF10
- Dialling code: 01952
- Police: West Mercia
- Fire: Shropshire
- Ambulance: West Midlands
- UK Parliament: The Wrekin

Edgmond is a village and civil parish in the borough of Telford and Wrekin and ceremonial county of Shropshire, England. The population of the parish at the 2011 Census was 2,062. It lies 1 mile (1.6 kilometres) north-west of the town of Newport.

The village has two pubs (the Lion and the Lamb), a Methodist chapel which has since been converted into apartments, a village hall, and a village shop with a co-located post office.

There is a recreation field called simply "The Playing Fields", where there are Sunday cricket games, pub football matches, and a playground for young children. The village also has many areas for walking and biking including an area called the Rock Hole, an old sandstone quarry from which the rock used to build the local church was taken.

Also popular is the canal walk, which leads down to the local town of Newport along the old canals. The canals are now often used for fishing competitions. There has been much speculation about the possibility of reopening the old Shrewsbury and Newport Canal route.

There is a Church of England parish church in Edgmond, dedicated to St.Peter. It is in the Archdeaconry of Salop and Diocese of Lichfield.

The parish war memorial, on a roadside, erected to commemorate war dead of World War I, consists of a sandstone pillar surmounted by a crucifix with figures of a soldier and a nurse looking up at the figure of Christ.

== Etymology ==
The name Edgmond comes from the Anglo-Saxon for edge of marsh; the hamlet of Edgmond Marsh lies north of the village at 52°46′55″N 02°25′05″W.

== Education ==
The village has a Church of England primary school, called St.Peter's.

Harper Adams University is in Edgmond. The University has accommodation in the village, where many international students stay. The main subjects taught at the college are related to the food chain and much research is done there. Here on 10 January 1982 the English lowest temperature weather record was broken (and is kept to this day): −26.1 °C (−15.0 °F).

== Notable people ==
- Richard Barnfield (1574 – 1620) – English poet, obscure though close relationship with William Shakespeare, brought up in Edgmond.
- Folklorist Charlotte Burne (1850-1923) lived in childhood at Edgmond.
- Rachel Bright - English children's author and illustrator, grew up at Edgmond.

Previous Rectors of Edgmond include:

- Thomas Gilbert was Puritan Rector of Edgmond 1648 to 1662 when he was ejected. During that period he was nicknamed 'the bishop of Shropshire'.
- Thomas Bucknall Lloyd (also concurrently Archdeacon of Salop) from 1888 to 1896, dying there,
- Sir Lovelace Stamer (also concurrently Anglican Bishop of Shrewsbury), from 1896 to 1905, during which period he built new schools for local children, organised a working men's club and reading rooms, and paid for a piped water supply for the village.

== Customs ==
The church holds an annual Church Clipping service, which claims to be the longest uninterrupted clipping service in the country.

Edgmond was once associated with the practice of souling, a possible contributor to the halloween practice of trick or treating. The folk song "The Edgmond Man's Souling Song" was released by folk musicians John Kirkpatrick and Sue Harris on their 1976 album Among The Many Attractions at the Show will be a Really High Class Band.

== Civil parish ==
In addition to the village of Edgmond, the parish includes the settlements of Edgmond Marsh and Adeney.

== Transport ==
=== Bus ===
Services operating in the Edgmond area, as of 2023:

Number	Route	Operator	Days of operation
103	Newport - Tibberton - Wellington	Telford and Wrekin Council	Monday - Friday (excluding public holidays)
519	Newport - Shrewsbury	Arriva Midlands	Monday - Friday (school terms only)

== See also ==
- Listed buildings in Edgmond
