= Corbet family =

English family of Anglo-Norman extraction

Corbet
- One variant of the arms of the Corbet family: Or, a raven sable
- Country: Kingdom of England, Kingdom of Great Britain, United Kingdom
- Founded: 11th century
- Founder: Roger and Robert Corbet
- Historic seat: Moreton Corbet Castle
- Titles: List: English branch; Baron of Caus (11th century); Corbet baronets of Sprowston (1623); Corbet baronets of Stoke upon Tern (first creation, 1627); Corbet baronets of Moreton Corbet (first creation, 1642); Corbet baronets of Leighton (1642); Viscountess Corbet (1679) (life peerage created for the widow of Sir Vincent Corbet, 1st Baronet); Corbet baronets of Stoke upon Tern (second creation, 1786); Corbet baronets of Moreton Corbet (second creation, 1808); Scottish branch; Baron Rowallan
- Motto: DEUS PASCIT CORVOS; God feeds the Ravens

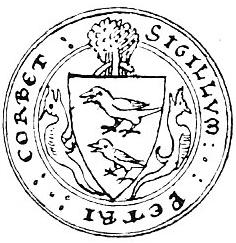
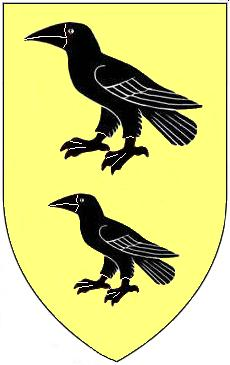
Arms of Peter Corbet (died 1322), 8th feudal baron of Caus and 2nd Baron by writ, as shown on his seal attached to the Barons' Letter, 1301: Or, two ravens sable. Legend on seal: Sigillum Petri Corbet ("Seal of Peter Corbet")

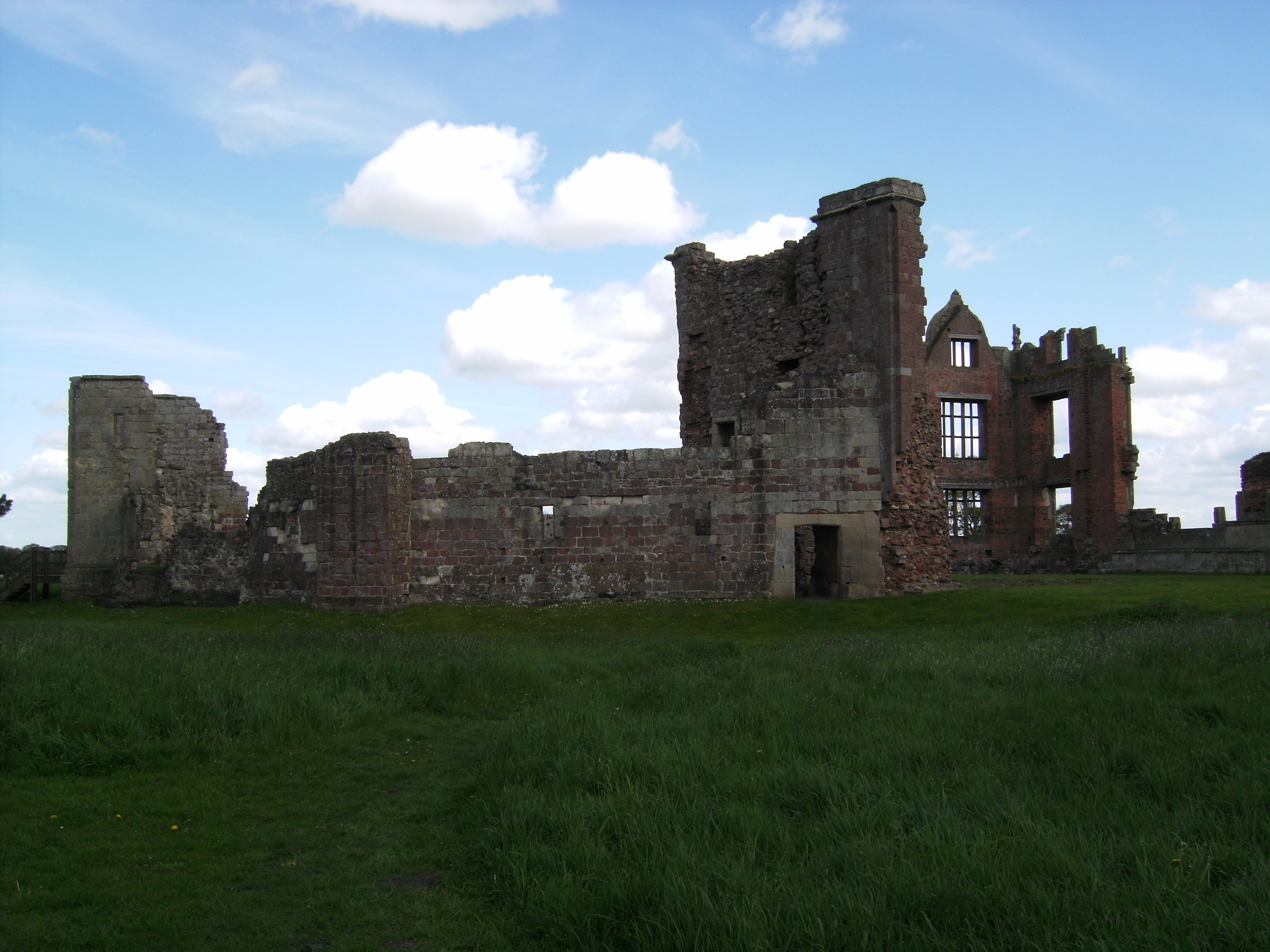
Remains of Moreton Corbet Castle

The Corbet family is an aristocratic English family of Anglo-Norman extraction, who were amongst the early marcher lords, holding the barony of Caus. Following the extinction of the senior line (and therefore the loss of the barony) the junior line based at Moreton Corbet Castle would go on to become one of the most powerful and richest of the landed gentry in Shropshire. The family trace their ancestry to two barons found in the 1086 Domesday Book and they probably came from the Boitron and Essay region, near Sées in Normandy.

The name Corbet derives from the Anglo-Norman word corb, meaning "crow" or "raven", matching the modern French corbeau. Variants of the name include: Corbet, Corbett, Corbitt, Corbit, Corbetts, Corbete, Corben and possibly the variant of Corbin. The underlying derivation is from the Latin word corvus, crow. Generally it is thought to be a jocular reference to a person who was thought to resemble a crow or raven: in hair colour, tone of voice or shape of nose. However, the Scandinavians believed that a raven on the battlefield was a beneficial omen and ensured victory.

== History ==
=== Feudal barons of Caus and their descendants ===
In the Domesday Book of 1086, Roger Corbet and his brother Robert were listed as some of the most important tenants-in-chief of the king and the powerful Marcher Lord Roger, Earl of Shrewsbury Roger Corbet is generally believed to have been the first feudal baron of Caus in Shropshire, which was a barony within the marcher lordship of Roger de Montgomerie (died 1094). He was succeeded after 1121 by his son Robert Corbet (d. pre-1155). He was succeeded by Roger Corbet, who himself was succeeded by Robert (died 1222), who left a son Thomas who died in 1274. There followed his son and heir Peter Corbet (died 1300) who left a son Peter Corbet (died 1322), who died childless. The barony then passed to his half-brother John. Although the family soon died out in the senior line, when the barony was lost, cadet branches spread out and thrived.

==== Corbets of Moreton Corbet ====
From the eclipse of the senior line at Caus, the most important Shropshire branch of the Corbets was that of Moreton Toret, later called Moreton Corbet, where they had a castle. Members of this branch regularly represented Shropshire, and sometimes other constituencies, in the House of Commons of England over several centuries. They were among the most powerful and richest of landed gentry families in the county, especially in the 16th century, when there was no resident aristocracy. Together with its offshoots at Stoke upon Tern and Stanwardine, the Moreton Corbet family played a major part in the county's passage through the English Reformation and the English Civil War. Some of the Corbet politicians are featured in the family tree below. The Corbets long retained part of their former vast estates in Shropshire. The Return of Owners of Land, 1873 showed that, of the 13 landowners who owned more than 8,000 acres in the county, two were Corbets: Sir V. R. Corbet owned 9,489 acres and I. D. Corbet owned 8,118 acres.

The Corbets of Moreton Corbet, Stanwardine and Stoke

Based on pedigrees derived from the Heraldic Visitation of Shropshire, 1623, and in Augusta Corbet's family history, supplemented by more recent information from the History of Parliament Online.

Katherine, daughter of John le Strange of Knockin and Myddle	Sir Robert Corbet (died 1300) of Moreton Toret and Wattlesborough	Matilda (died 1309), daughter John de Arundel
Amice	Thomas Corbet (died 1310) of Moreton Toret and Wattlesborough	Fulk Corbet, Canon of Lichfield Cathedral	John Corbet
Sir Robert Corbet (1304–75) of Moreton Toret and Wattlesborough	Elizabeth, daughter of Fulk, 1st Baron Strange of Blackmere
Robert de Harley	Joan Corbet	John Darras of Sidbury and Neenton	Elizabeth	Sir Fulk Corbet (died 1382) of Moreton Corbet
Elizabeth	Sir Thomas Corbet (died c.1359)	Sir Roger Corbet (died 1395) of Moreton Corbet	Margaret Erdington (died 1395)
Alicia Harley	Sir John Ipstones (d. 1394) of Blymhill	Elizabeth Corbet	John de la Pole of Dinas Mawddwy	Elizabeth Corbet, heiress to Wattlesborough
ROBERT CORBET of Moreton Corbet (1383–1420)	Margaret	William Mallory of Papworth St. Agnes	Roger Corbet (died 1430) of Shrewsbury	Elizabeth Lichfield of Eastham, Worcestershire
Thomas Mallory	Humphrey Stafford of Frome	Margaret Corbet
Thomas Corbet of Moreton Corbet (died c.1436)	Ancaret de Barre	Anna or Julianna Corbet	John Sandford	Mary Corbet	Robert Charlton
Roger Corbet of Moreton Corbet (died 1468)	Elizabeth Hopton	Dorothea Corbet	Philip Kynastone
Anna or Julianna Corbet	Thomas Sturry of Rossall	Elizabeth Corbet	Richard Cholmeley of Chester	Sir Richard Corbet of Moreton Corbet (died 1493)	Elizabeth, daughter of Walter Devereux, 8th Baron Ferrers of Chartley
Thomas Thornes of Shelvock	Maria Corbet	Thomas Crump of Upton Magna	Jane Corbet
Katherine Corbet	Thomas Onslow of Rodington, Shropshire	Anna Corbet	Thomas Cornwall of Burford, Shropshire	Elizabeth Corbet	Thomas Trentham of Shrewsbury
Sir Robert Corbet of Moreton Corbet (died 1513)	Elizabeth (d. 1563), daughter of Sir Henry Vernon of Tong and Haddon	Thomas Lacon of Willey, Shropshire	Maria Corbet	Richard Mainwaring of Ightfield	Margaret Corbet
Anne Windsor, daughter of Andrew Windsor, 1st Baron Windsor	Roger Corbet (died 1538) of Moreton Corbet and Linslade	Richard Corbet of Poynton	Margaret Savile	Reginald Corbet of Stoke upon Tern	Alice Gratewood, co-heiress of Sir Rowland Hill
Jane Needham	Sir Andrew Corbet (died 1578) of Moreton Corbet	Robert Corbet of Stanwardine	Jane Kynaston	Jerome Corbet of Beslow	Dorothy Poyner	Richard Corbet of Stoke	Anne Bromley, daughter of Sir Thomas Bromley
Robert Corbet (died 1583) of Moreton Corbet	Richard Corbet (died 1606) of Moreton Corbet	Judith Austin	William Boothby	Sir Vincent Corbet (died 1623) of Moreton Corbet	Frances Humfreston	Sir John Corbet, 1st Bart., Puritan and Parliamentarian	Anne Mainwaring of Ightfield
Elizabeth Boothby	Sir Andrew Corbet of Moreton Corbet, Parliamentarian	Margaret Corbet	Thomas Corbet of Stanwardine	Sir John Corbet, 2nd Baronet, Cavalier
Sarah Monson	Sir Vincent Corbet, 1st Baronet of Moreton Corbet, Cavalier	Elizabeth Ludlow	Robert Corbet of Stanwardine, lawyer and Parliamentarian

=== Channel Islands Corbets ===
The Corbets of the Channel Islands are documented in numerous Extentes namely; 1309 Roll of Assizes – 2 references to "Richard Corbel" of Trinity 1272 Extentes – 1 reference to "Raoul Corbel" 1331 Extentes – 1 reference to "Richard Corbel", and 2 each to "Jean Corbey" and "William Corbey" 1528 Extentes – 1 reference to "Vincent Corbel" of Trinity 1607 Extentes – 1 reference each to "Silvester Cobell", "Hellier Corbet", "Vincent Corbell", "John Corbell" and 2 references to "Drewet Corbell" 1668 Extentes – 1 reference to Corbel family 1749 Extentes – 2 references to "Elizabeth Corbet, daughter of James Corbet" Some of these Corbets were born Jersey and the most notable was – Major Gov. Moses Corbet (1728–1814) – Lieutenant Governor of Jersey. Most of the Corbets had already moved to or later moved to Guernsey where the family flourished until c. 1956 upon the death of William Corbet, son of Jean Thomas Corbet. By the 20th century the Corbets were the largest land owners in the Vale Parish once known as the Clos du Valle. The Corbets under Jean Thomas Corbet Esq. (1836–1926) owned and operated two granite quarries which they exported stone to England. Louise Corbet, daughter of Jean Thomas married John Bichard and thus together the families created the first glasshouse growing operation in Guernsey; the vast estate was called "Les Landes". The Corbets entertained King George V and Queen Mary on their visit to the vineries in 1921. The Corbets' Fruit Export Company thrived and they were suppliers to Buckingham Palace. In the 1930s the Corbet family donated land that would become the Corbet Field, an important athletic area.

Notable descendants and relatives of Jean Thomas Corbet include; – Denys Corbet (1826–1909), poet and painter. (cousin) – Christian Cardell Corbet (born 1976), FA, FRSA, portrait sculptor and painter, sculptor in residence – Royal Canadian Navy and benefactor; regimental sculptor – The Royal Canadian Regiment.

=== Scottish branch ===
The first Corbet in Scotland came from Shropshire, and settled in Teviotdale under Earl David (later King David I of Scotland) in the first quarter of the 12th century. He is said to have obtained the manor of Fogo which he held as a vassal under the Earls of Dunbar.

Robert fitz Corbet appeared in Scotland in about 1116 as one of the retinue of Earl David, who later became King David I. The author, Augusta Corbet, who wrote The Family of Corbet – Its Life and Times, says that Robert was the son of Roger Corbet and grandson of Corbet le Normand. It is said he belonged to the family which held Drayton in Northamptonshire.

Robert Corbet was a witness in the instrument or Inquisition made by David, Prince of Cumberland, into the lands belonging to the old Church of Glasgow, and is also a witness in other deeds of David when he was King of Scotland (1124–53).

The Cumberland or Cumbria of those days extended to the Clyde, and included Glasgow, which David incorporated into Scotland. David appears to have allotted lands in Roxburghshire to Robert Corbet, where his descendants were "great lords of several generations". For many centuries the Corbets held lands in the Scottish Borders and were loyal to Scotland. By the late 13th century, the Corbets owned land in the Castle Douglas/ Dalbeattie areas in addition to their traditional tenures. A century later, Constantine Corbet owned lands in Fife and a Walter Corbet owned lands around Lochmaben. By the late 16th century, Corbets owned lands in Clydesdale, with Symont Corbet's will showing land held near Hamilton (1574).

In 1745 the Corbets supported the British Government. When Bonnie Prince Charlie landed in Scotland. Robert Corbet, then provost of Dumfries, rode out with his men to meet him and warned the Prince to stand aside as Dumfries would have nothing to do with him. He then returned to Dumfries and locked the gates against the Prince.

Throughout the 17th and 18th centuries, Corbets were busy in Scotland in a variety of occupations, including shipmasters, tanners, tailors, schoolmasters, weavers, etc. In 1784, James Corbett was a weaver in Larkhall and in Hamilton, other Corbetts were prospering in the late 18th century. Janefield, part of the Tollcross estate and now a cemetery, was occupied and farmed by a James Corbett in 1751.

The Scottish Corbett branch of the family currently hold the title Baron Rowallan. Their arms include the raven seen on the arms of the English branch of the family and they share the same motto Deus Pascit Corvo - God feeds the ravens.

== Castles and seats ==
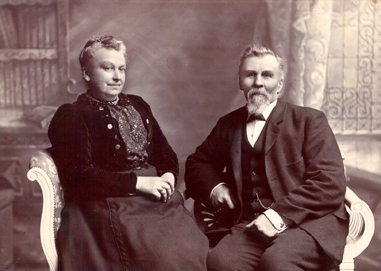
1880s image of Jean Thomas Corbet and wife taken by Grut photographers, Guernsey Channel Island

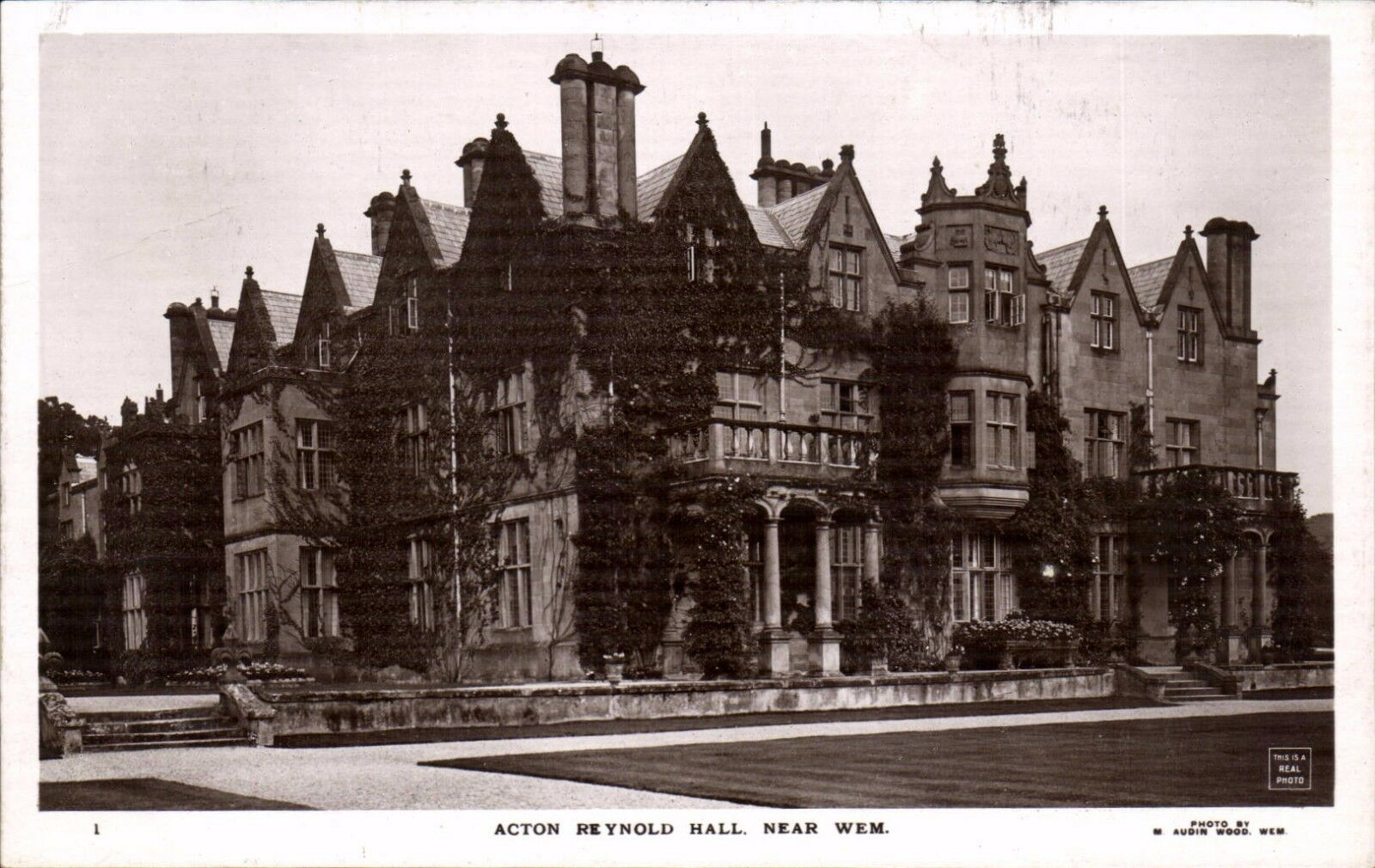
A postcard c. 1920 of Acton Reynald Hall

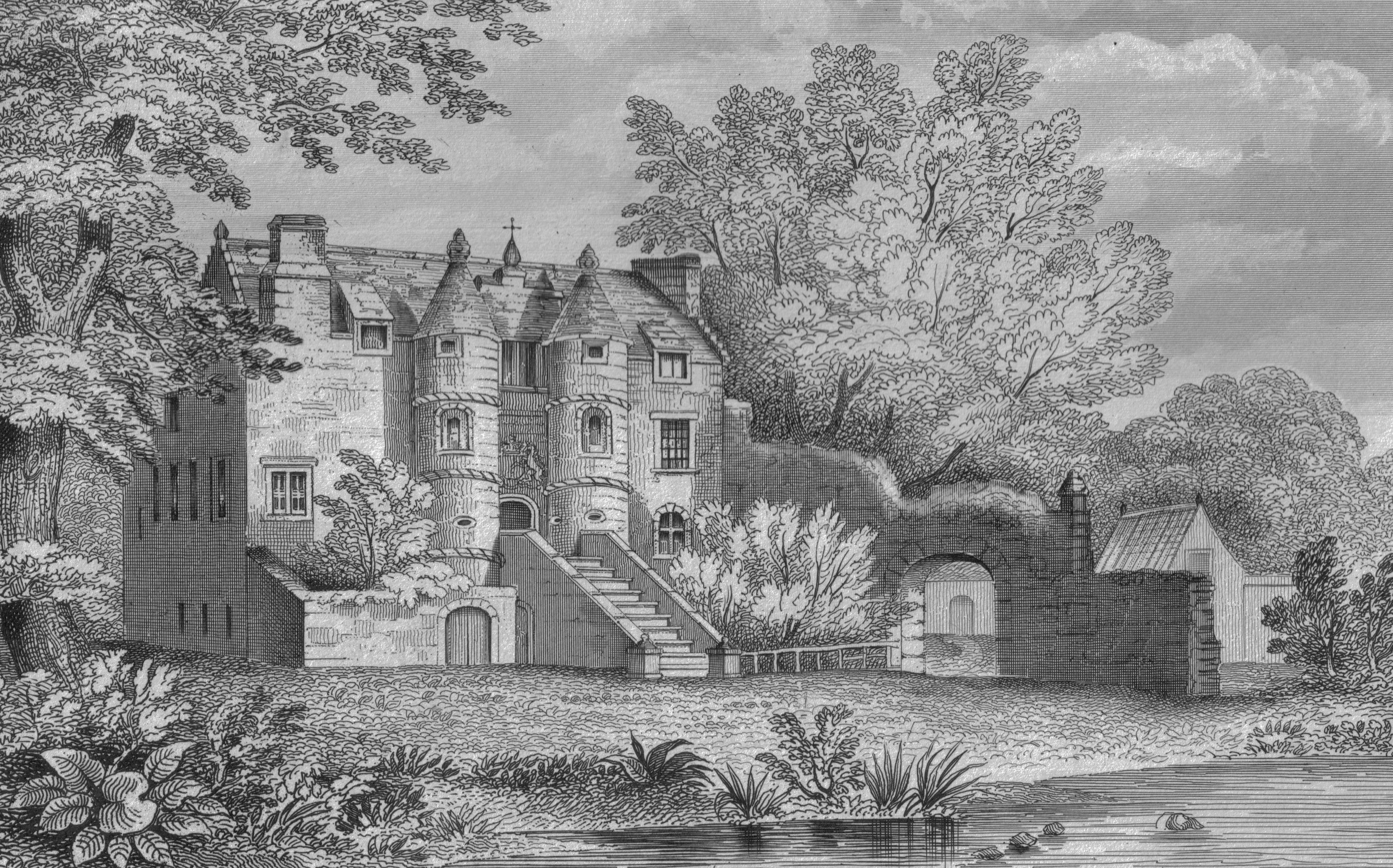
Rowallan Castle, Ayrshire

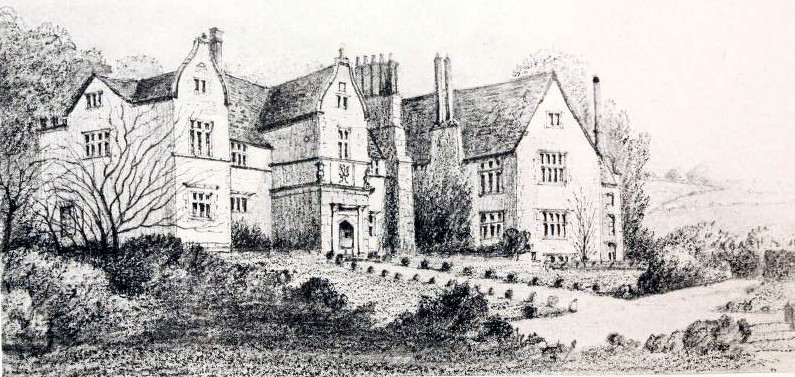
Stanwardine Hall, Shropshire: the home of Robert Corbet and his family. From a drawing of 1901.

- Acton Reynald Hall is a 19th-century country manor house and park created by the Corbet Family in the 17th century at Acton Reynald, Shropshire, England, and an example of one of the many Corbet Lordships in Shropshire.
- Acton Burnell Castle ruins about eight miles Southeast of Shrewsbury, near to the Acton Burnell Church and Hall, claim attention, from the many interesting and historical facts connected with it; it is recorded a Parliament was held here in the year 1283 by Edward I, on which occasion the Lords sat at Shrewsbury, and the Commons in the banqueting hall of the castle here, the gable ends of which still remain; here it was that the statute known by the name of the Acton Burnell Statute or "Statuta de Mercatoribus (Statutes of Merchants)" was passed. Long before Edward I, William The Conqueror took the Saxon Godric's manor from him and gave it to the Norman Earl of Shrewsbury, who in turn conferred it on Roger Fitz-Corbet. It is supposed that Roger, the Domesday tenant of Actune, was ancestor of those Burnels, from whom afterwards the manor took its distinctive title of Acton Burnell.
- Alberbury Castle was built by Fulke Fitz Warine in the 13th century and held under the Barons of Caus, was added protection for Shrewsbury Castle against the threat of the Welsh. In addition, Shropshire was also given a Norman sheriff called Warin who held a number of manors around Oswestry.
- Caus Castle (also known as, or recorded in historical documents as Cause; Caurs; Chaus; Caws; Caurse; Alretone; Auretone; Averetonee), often described as a fortress of uncommon strength and extent, is about 2 miles southwest of Westbury, Shropshire, England and is located along the Welsh Marches. Caus Castle was built by Roger Corbet (1066–1134) a Domesday founder for his family, and is named for his homeland in Pays de Caux, Normandy, France, and was the seat of their Marcher Lordships granted under Roger de Montgomery, Earl of Shrewsbury (Shropshire) and King William the Conqueror.
- Hopton Castle is in the village of the same name and is located between Knighton, Powys, Wales and Craven Arms (Newton), Shropshire, England. Hopton Castle passed by marriage to the Moreton Corbet family in the 15th century.
- High Ercall Hall & High Ercall Church (pronounced High Arcal) in the borough of Telford & Wrekin, were owned by the Corbets by marriage to the Newport's.
- Longnor Hall A 17th-century manor house built by the Corbets in the Shropshire village of Longnor, Shropshire. The hall displays the Corbet crow arms on its gable end.
- Moreton Corbet Castle in Shropshire, England was acquired by the Corbets in 1235, when Sir Richard Corbet of Wattlesborough b. 1191, who married Joan Thoreton b. 1200 the daughter of Bartholomew Thoreton of Moreton Thoret. Sometime around 1560 Sir Andrew Corbet rebuilt the castle and built a new east range with a great hall, to this was added an ornate south range designed in a L-shape by Sir Andrew's son, Robert Corbet. It is this latter addition that stands as one of the landmarks in English architectural history.
- Rowallan Castle was the seat for later chiefs of the Corbets which was originally the seat of the chiefs of Clan Muir.
- Sibdon Castle in Sibdon Carwood, near Craven Arms, Shropshire, England. The fortified manor at Sibdon Carwood, the predecessor to the 17th-century Sibdon Castle country house, is given the name "Shepeton Corbet" by a number of historical documents, including that of John Leland (c. 1535–43), who also gives the suffix to Hopton Corbet Castle and Moreton Corbet Castle. This is an indication that the Corbet family owned these fortified manors around the time, of which Moreton Corbet's castle both remains in their ownership and retains the suffix to this day.
- Sundorne Castle was home of the Corbet-Pigott family
- Wattlesborough Castle was a fortified manor held by the Barons of Caus, which later passed from the Corbets to the John de Mowthe Family.
- Siston, Gloucestershire, which branch died out in the late 14th century. The arms of Corbet of Siston continued to be quartered by the Denys family of Siston, which inherited the Corbet estates by marriage, although no children resulted.

== Armorials ==
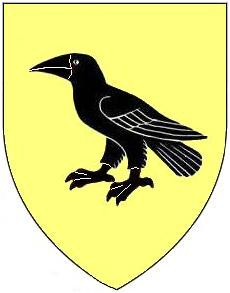
Arms of Corbet baronets of Moreton Corbet, cr. 1808: Or, a raven sable

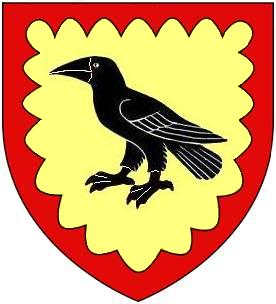
Arms of Corbet of Chaddesley Corbett: Or a raven proper within a bordure engrailed gules.

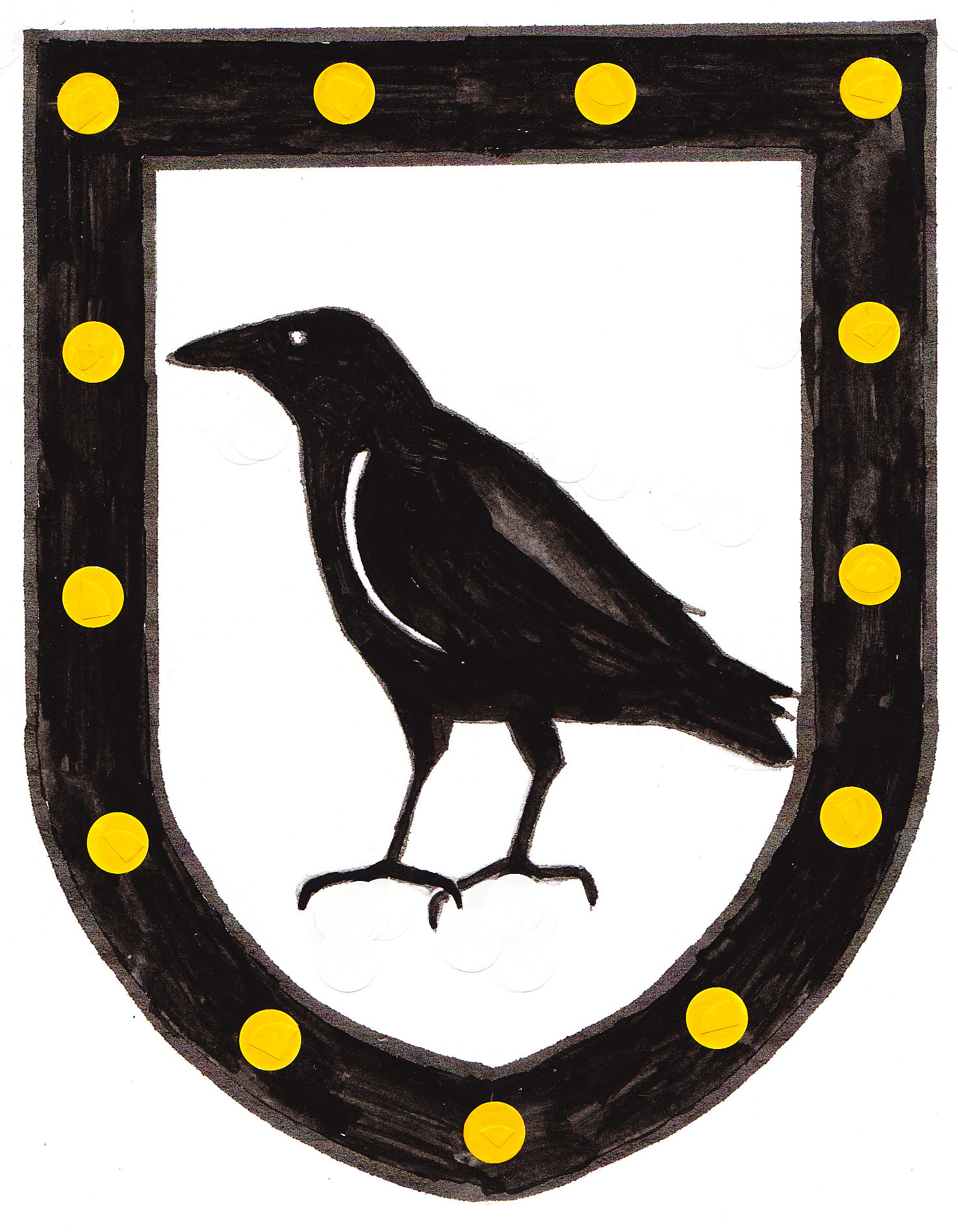
Arms of Corbet of Siston, Glos. & Hope, Salop.: Argent, a raven proper within a bordure sable bezantee. These arms continued to be quartered by the Denys family of Siston

Family legend has a mythical Corbet le Normand arriving in 1066 with William the Conqueror from Normandy carrying a banner displaying a raven, from his supposed name Le Corbeau, usually translated from Norman French as "the Raven".

Sir Roger Corbet displayed two ravens proper on a gold shield with a bordure red engrailed under King Edward III;

Sir Peter Corbet, 2nd Baron of Caus, displayed two ravens proper on a gold shield at the Battle of Falkirk in 1298, as recorded in the Falkirk Roll and in the Barons' Letter, 1301;

Sir Thomas Corbet, displayed two ravens proper on a gold shield; Sir Thomas Corbet, displayed three ravens proper on a gold shield at the First Dunstable Tournament in 1308;

Sir Thomas Corbet, displayed six ravens proper on a gold shield with a red canton with 2 silver lions passant gardant in 1567.

Other variations include A Raven or two Ravens and a key on a Silver Shield. The arms of the recently extinct Corbet baronets are: Or, a raven sable.
