= Corbet baronets =

There have been six baronetcies created for members of the Corbet family, four in the Baronetage of England, one in the Baronetage of Great Britain and one in the Baronetage of the United Kingdom. All creations are extinct.

- Corbet baronets of Sprowston (1623)
- Corbet baronets of Stoke upon Tern (first creation, 1627)
- Corbet baronets of Moreton Corbet (first creation, 1642)
- Corbet baronets of Leighton (1642)
- Corbet baronets of Stoke upon Tern (second creation, 1786)
- Corbet baronets of Moreton Corbet (second creation, 1808)

== See also ==
- Astley-Corbett baronets
- Corbet family
