= Vincent Corbet =

Vincent Corbet may refer to:

- Sir Vincent Corbet, 1st Baronet (1617–1656), of the Corbet baronets
- Sir Vincent Corbet, 2nd Baronet (c. 1642–1681), of the Corbet baronets, MP for Shropshire 1679
- Sir Vincent Corbet, 3rd Baronet (1670–1688), of the Corbet baronets
- Sir Vincent Rowland Corbet, 3rd Baronet (1821–1891), of the Corbet baronets
