= Wood baronets of Gatton (1808) =

Escutcheon of the Wood baronets of Gatton

The Wood baronetcy, of Gatton in the County of Surrey, was created in the Baronetage of the United Kingdom on 3 October 1808 for Mark Wood, a military engineer in Bengal and politician. The second Baronet represented Gatton in the House of Commons. The title became extinct on his death in 1837.

== Wood baronets, of Gatton (1808) ==
- Sir Mark Wood, 1st Baronet (1750–1829)
- Sir Mark Wood, 2nd Baronet (1794–1837)

== Notes ==
Baronetage of the United Kingdom
Preceded by Corbet baronets	Wood baronets of Gatton; 3 October 1808	Succeeded by Graham baronets
