= Graham baronets of Kirkstall (1808) =

Escutcheon of the Graham baronets of Kirkstall

The Graham baronetcy, of Kirkstall in the County of York, was created in the Baronetage of the United Kingdom on 3 October 1808 for the lawyer James Graham. He sat as Member of Parliament for Carlisle between 1812 and 1825. The fifth Baronet was Lieutenant-Governor of Grenada from 1875 to 1877. On his death in 1895 the title became extinct.

== Graham baronets, of Kirkstall (1808) ==
- Sir James Graham, 1st Baronet (1753–1825)
- Sir Sandford Graham, 2nd Baronet (1788–1852)
- Sir Sandford Graham, 3rd Baronet (1821–1875)
- Sir Lumley Graham, 4th Baronet (1828–1890)
- Sir Cyril Clerke Graham, 5th Baronet (1834–1895), died without male issue.

== Notes ==
Baronetage of the United Kingdom
| Preceded by Wood baronets | Graham baronets of Kirkstall; 3 October 1808 | Succeeded by Sitwell baronets |
