= Cyril Graham =

English diplomat and colonial administrator

Sir Cyril Clerke Graham, 5th Baronet C.M.G.
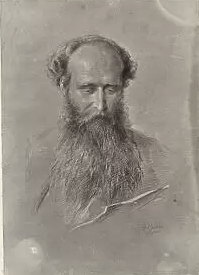
- Portrait of Graham around 1866, by Ronald Leslie-Melville
- Born: 1834
- Died: 1895 (aged 60–61)
- Occupation: colonial administrator
- Title: Sir

Sir Cyril Clerke Graham, 5th Baronet (1834–1895) was an English diplomat and colonial administrator. He became known as a traveller in the Transjordan. He also published a paper on the Avar language based on a journey from the Caspian Sea in the Caucasus area in 1873.

== Background ==
He was the third son of Sir Sandford Graham, 2nd Baronet, and his wife Caroline Langston, third daughter of John. He was admitted to Trinity College, Cambridge in 1851, matriculating in 1852. His brother Sandford, the 3rd Baronet, died in 1875 leaving no children. The second son Lumley then became the 4th Baronet.

== Travels ==
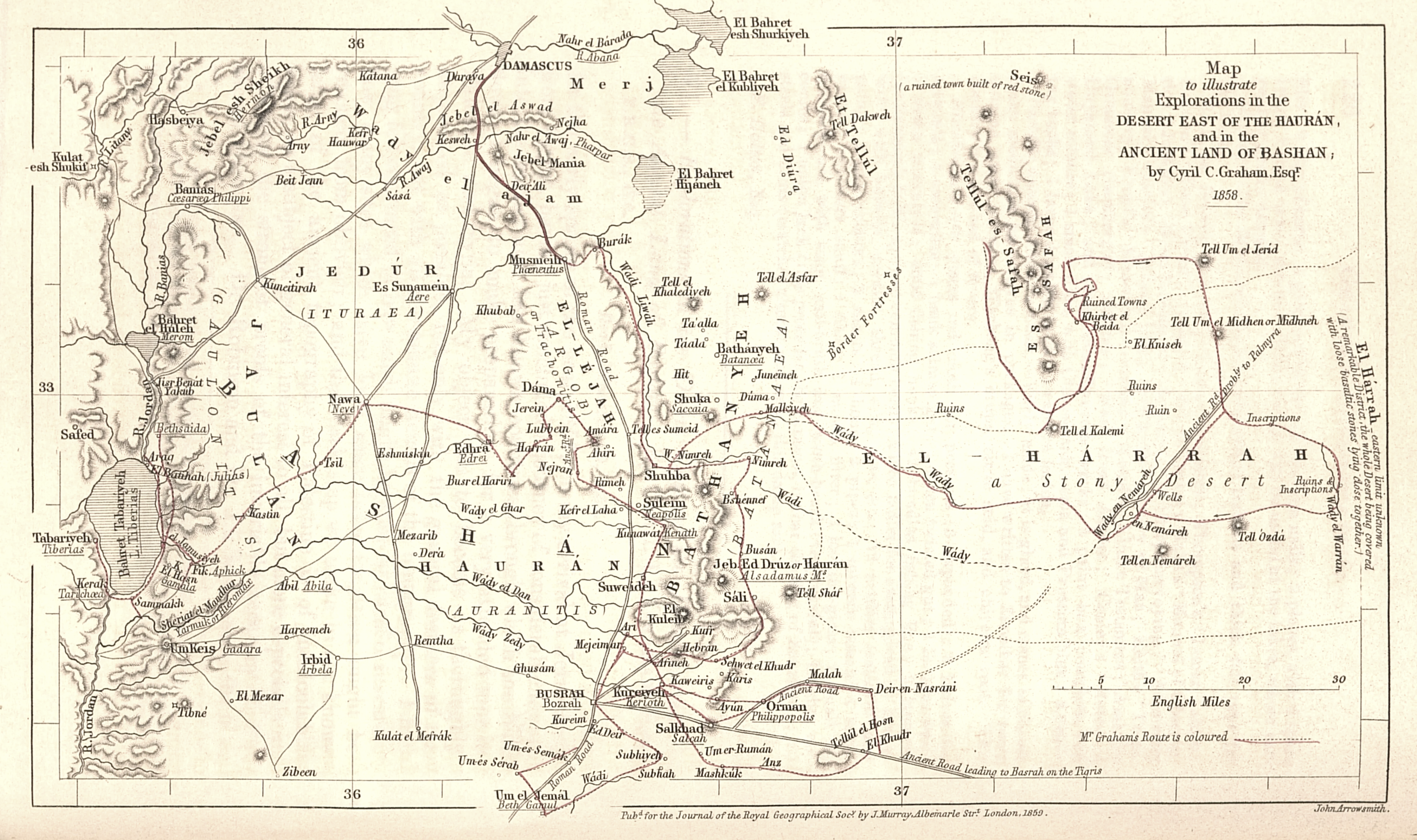
Map illustrating Graham's 1858 paper Explorations in the Desert East of the Haurán, the Ancient Land of Bashan

In 1856–7 Graham travelled through Africa to Egypt, including a journey up the River Nile. In 1857–8 he travelled in the Hauran, at the same time as Johann Gottfried Wetzstein, a Prussian diplomat based in Damascus, was also independently journeying and reporting on the area. They both made known the Roman fort at Nemara (Nimreh). His 1857 trip aroused considerable interest in Germany. Wetzstein's six-week exploration in 1858 was prompted by Carl Ritter, who was aware of a paper Graham had written in the Journal of the Royal Geographical Society. In transit from Britain to Syria, Graham stopped in Berlin and met up with Christian Charles Josias von Bunsen, another Prussian diplomat: it is assumed that they had become acquainted during von Bunsen's time in London. Heinrich Kiepert had collated information on Graham's previous travels for a map illustrating a report on those by Wetzstein.

Continuing his journeys, Graham travelled on in 1858–9 to Egypt, sailed to Arabia, and returned overland to Cairo. At this point, he met Lord Dufferin, who was looking for assistance in an excavation at Deir el-Bahari. Graham joined him, and the two became good friends. In the summer of 1859 they rode together from Beirut to Damascus, then over Mount Lebanon to Jerusalem. They took Dufferin's yacht from Jaffa and returned to London via Athens and an overland route, in January 1860.

== Diplomat ==
The outbreak of the 1860 civil conflict in Mount Lebanon and Damascus brought the attention of the British Foreign Office to Lebanon and Syria. In July of that year Lord John Russell created the "Dufferin commission" of enquiry into the violence, which Dufferin led to 1861. Graham himself had hoped to be the commissioner, but his views on the situation were not acceptable to the Foreign Office. Graham accompanied Dufferin on the commission. During this period the British government released, with other documents, an extended letter from Graham in Beirut to Dufferin on the violence. At the end of 1861 Macmillan & Co. announced a book Syria as a Province of the Ottoman Empire by Graham; but it apparently never appeared.

== Societies ==
Graham was elected a Fellow of the Royal Astronomical Society, and of the Linnean Society, in 1858. He joined the Society of Dilettanti in 1863. He belonged to the Royal Asiatic Society of Great Britain and Ireland, and the Royal Geographical Society, of which he was Foreign Secretary from 1866 to 1871. He also belonged to the Geological Society.

== Later life ==
While Henry Herbert, 4th Earl of Carnarvon was Colonial Secretary in 1866–7, Graham acted as his private secretary. In 1870–1 Graham was in Canada, negotiating on behalf of the Hudson's Bay Company. In 1873 he travelled from Arkhangelsk to Astrakhan, continuing through Dagestan and Georgia. He was accompanied by John Francis Campbell. At Port-Petrovsk on the Caspian (Makhachkala) they obtained letters from Mikhail Loris-Melikov that facilitated their progress through Dagestan. Graham's paper on the Avar language and glossary were translated for the first time into Russian in 2014, by B. M. Atayev.

Graham was appointed Lieutenant-Governor of Grenada in January 1876, holding the post to 1877. He was created CMG. He succeeded his brother Lumley in the baronetcy in 1890.

In later life, Graham resided at Edmond Castle. He died at Cannes, on 9 May 1895.

== Family ==
Graham married in 1874 Louisa Frederica Hervey, daughter of Lord Charles Hervey. They had two daughters:

- Violet Evelyn Cecilia, married in 1900 William Graham-Harrison, who added Graham to his surname; they had two sons and a daughter.
- Beatrix Margaret Irene (died 1921), married 1906 as his first wife the Rev. William Herbert Mackean (1877–1960); they had five daughters and a son.

== Notes ==
Baronetage of the United Kingdom
Preceded by Lumley Graham	Baronet (of Kirkstall); 1890–1895	Extinct
