= Sir Richard Corbet, 2nd Baronet =

Sir Richard Corbet, 2nd Baronet, FRS, (1640 – 1 August 1683) was an English politician who sat in the House of Commons from 1677 to 1683.

Corbet was the son of Edward Corbet and his wife Anne Newport, the daughter of Richard Newport, 1st Baron Newport of High Ercall, Shropshire. Edward was son of Sir Edward Corbet, 1st Baronet of Leighton, Montgomeryshire but predeceased him on 30 May 1653. Richard Corbet thus succeeded to the baronetcy on the death of his grandfather in 1655. He matriculated at Christ Church, Oxford on 31 July 1658 and lived at Longnor Hall, Shropshire. He was elected a Fellow of the Royal Society in 1665.

In 1677, he was elected Member of Parliament for Shrewsbury in a by-election to the Cavalier Parliament. He was re-elected MP for Shrewsbury in the two elections of 1679 and in 1681. He was chairman of the Committee of Elections in the time of King Charles II.

Corbet died at the age of about 42 and was buried at St Margaret's, Westminster on 3 August 1683. He had married by licence dated 5 January 1662, Victoria Uvedale, daughter of Sir William Uvedale of Wickham, Hampshire and his wife Victoria Price.

Parliament of England
Preceded by Robert Leighton; Thomas Jones	Member of Parliament for Shrewsbury; 1677–1683; With: Robert Leighton 1677–1679; Edward Kynaston	Succeeded by Edward Kynaston; Sir Francis Edwardes
Baronetage of England
Preceded by Edward Corbet	Baronet (of Leighton); 1655–1683	Succeeded by Uvedale Corbet
