= John Ipstones =

English soldier, politician, landowner

John Ipstones (died 1394) was an English soldier, politician and landowner. He fought in the Hundred Years War and in John of Gaunt's expedition to win the Crown of Castile. He represented Staffordshire twice in the House of Commons of England, including the Merciless Parliament of 1388, in which he supported the measures of the Lords Appellant. A member of a notoriously quarrelsome and violent landed gentry family, he pursued numerous property and personal disputes, one of which led to his murder while in London, serving as a Member of Parliament.

== Background ==
John Ipstones was the eldest son of Sir John Ipstones of Blymhill, Staffordshire, son of John de Ipstones or Ipstanes, and Elizabeth Beck, of Hopton, Shropshire, and Tean, Staffordshire.

The Ipstones family were prominent in the affairs of Staffordshire, and had held Blymhill in Cuttlestone Hundred for some time. However, they had a long history of feuding with their neighbours. John de Ipstones, the MP's grandfather, had a particularly violent reputation and had initiated many of the quarrels which still raged in the last decades of the 14th century. In 1316 he and the abbot of Lilleshall Abbey were in trouble for mobilising a large armed force to prevent the arrest of Vivian de Staundon, known to have stolen a large sum of money belonging to the king, Edward II. In 1324 he was involved in a furious dispute with the Brumpton or Brompton family. This initially centred on the church of St Editha at Church Eaton, where John Ipstones, together with a group of his friends and relatives, expelled the incumbent, Thomas de Brumpton, by force and installed his own brother, William, garrisoning the church itself and attacking the manor house, which was the home of Mary de Brumpton. In 1325 the Ipstones family mounted an armed demonstration at Stafford during a county muster, with the result that a pitched battle between the Ipstones and Brumpton forces took place in the town, "to the great terror of the King's subjects, and against the King's peace." Mass arrests followed and in the ensuing trials most of the accused admitted arming in support of their family cause, although the Brumpton side generally denied terrorising the innocent, implying their actions had been in self-defence. In 1327 the cycle of feuding began again with a robbery committed by John, William and Philip Ipstones against Thomas de Brumpton. In the same court session Isabel of Pitchford accused them and their group of murdering her husband, Richard. The Sheriff of Staffordshire, Sir John de Hynkele, claimed that four of the group were too ill for him to produce them in court but he was fined 13s. 4d. for his "frivolous and insufficient" excuse. Although later apprehended and confined to the Marshalsea, all but one were released because Isabel did not appear in court against them and the county coroners later claimed they could not find the indictments. However, in 1329 a fracas on the way home led to the deaths of Philip Prior, the remaining accused, and William de Ipstones, and a near-fatal injury to John. At this point the robbery charge too was abandoned because the indictments could not be found. Early in 1330 John de Ipstones pleaded benefit of clergy when accused of murdering Thomas de Stafford. At a court appearance later in the year, when he was found not guilty, it transpired the case had been delayed because John had, in the interim, assaulted an Oxford University student. This pattern of mayhem, intimidation and virtual impunity seems to have been repeated across the generations.

The next John Ipstones seems to have maintained the feud with the Brumptons, perhaps at a lower level of violence. However, he initiated a new feud which was to continue in his son's lifetime by killing Adam Peshale of Horsley, near Eccleshall. Peshale seems to have been a notorious criminal and, after various preliminary inquiries, early in 1346 the king had commissioned the distinguished Staffordshire justice William de Shareshull and Robert de Ferrers, an important local magnate, to investigate him and bring him to justice. It seems that Ipstones headed a posse that apprehended Peshale and, since he was said to be resisting arrest, summarily beheaded him. On 27 May the king pre-empted any legal proceedings against the deputies by granting an indemnity to all those involved in what was probably a judicial murder. It was not so quickly forgiven by the dead man's family.

== Injury and redress ==
Ipstones, like his forebears, was apt to resort to violence in pursuit of his ends, and his career coincided with a period of considerable, though often exaggerated, disorder in Staffordshire. In 1371 his neighbour, Thomas Brumpton, sued Ipstones and five of his associates for an assault at Penkridge: they did not turn up for the case and the judge ordered their arrest. Six years later Brumpton and the executors of his father's will sued Ipstones for a debt of eight marks and again he absented himself from court. However, this frustrating lack of compliance was not uncommon: when Ipstones brought an action for trespass against John Weston of Cresswell in 1373 the defendant did not appear and the Sheriff was ordered to produce him at a subsequent hearing. Evidently the times were turbulent and it was often difficult to enforce the law but landowners were still mainly using it to pursue disputes. However, Ipstones and his peers seem to have become increasingly inured to violence during the reign of Richard II, when the balance of power constantly shifted.

== Landowner ==
=== The patrimony ===
John Ipstones inherited estates at Blymhill, Ipstones and Cresswell, Staffordshire on his father's death. This seems to have been about 1364, as the younger man is referred to in terms that suggest he had already inherited in a King's Bench action at Stafford in the Easter term of that year. He also held land in Corvedale, Shropshire, including the capital manor of Munslow, which he must have acquired through his mother, as her brother Nicholas de Beck was recorded as a tenant there in 1346.

=== Corbet property disputes ===
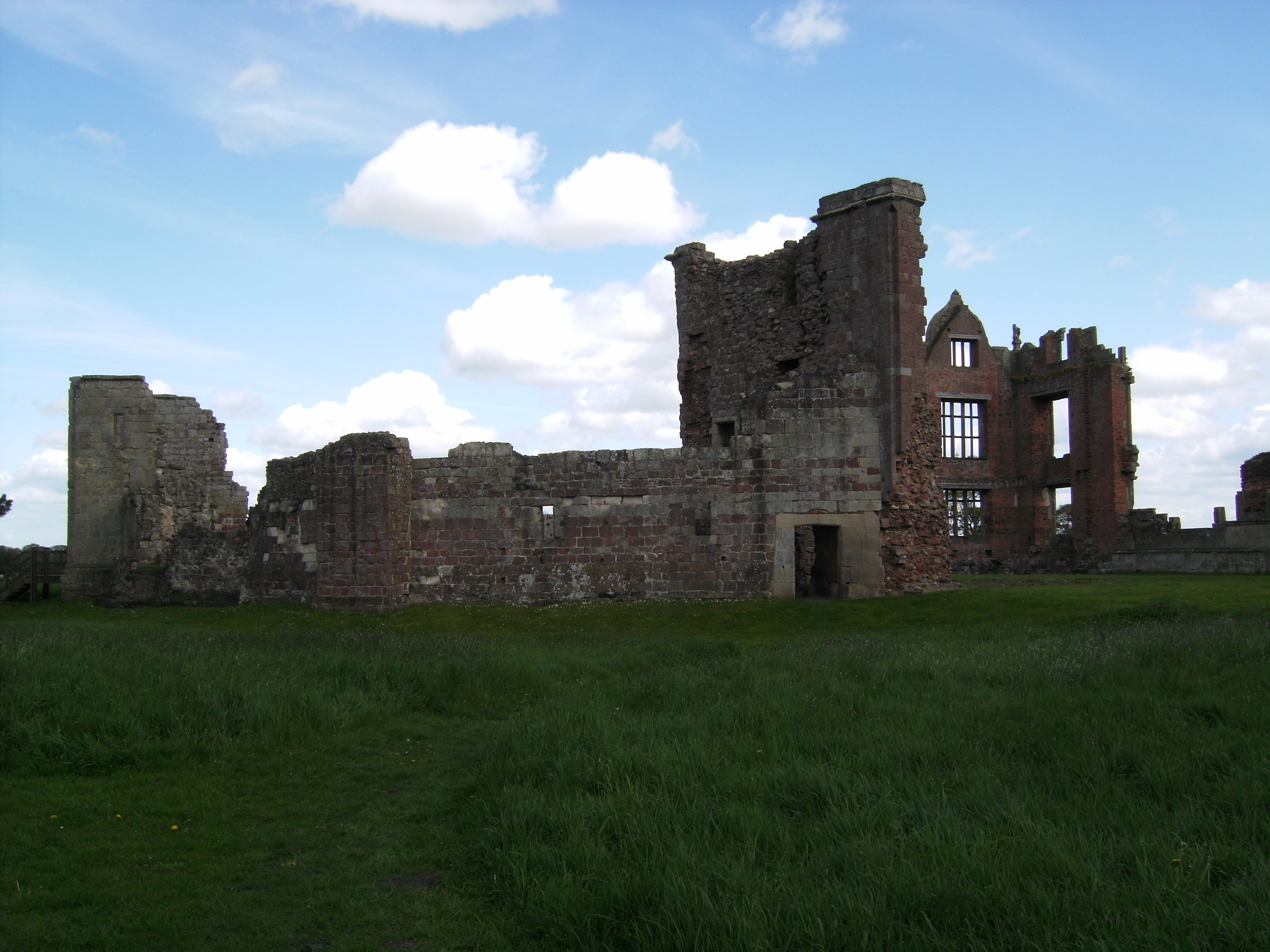
Moreton Corbet Castle from the west. Although much rebuilt and then replaced in the 16th century, the tall wall in the foreground survives from the family's medieval fortress.

Around 1374 Ipstones married Elizabeth Corbet, who was probably 16 or 17 years of age at the time. She was the daughter of Thomas Corbet, who was heir to the very large estates of Sir Robert Corbet of Moreton Corbet and Wattlesborough. However, Thomas had died long before his parents. Around 1363 they had initiated a series of property transactions, using the device of fine of lands, with the aim of keeping most of the estates in tail, to exclude Elizabeth and other female heirs, to the advantage principally of their surviving sons, Sir Fulk and Sir Roger. The devices they used were poorly drafted and self-contradictory, and were to lead to years of litigation and decades of bitterness among the Corbet family.

Ipstones and Elizabeth were the first to challenge this settlement, almost immediately after their marriage The action was initiated at the King's Bench in Leicester in Easter term of 1374, a year before Sir Robert died. The target of their action in the Court of Common Pleas was the Leicestershire manor of Braunstone. The manor was an example of the subinfeudation monarchs were desperate to end: the Corbets held it under the Harcourts, who held it of the Burdet family, who held it of the Ferrers family of Groby, the tenants-in-chief. Elizabeth's aunt, Margaret Corbet, had married the Warwickshire landowner Sir Thomas Erdington of Erdington and they had taken over Braunstone as early as 1364. Nevertheless, their response to the action by Ipstones and Elizabeth Corbet was that they held nothing in the manor. The suit went against a second strand in the Corbets' dynastic policy: that of contracting double marriage alliances wherever possible. Sir Robert had married two of his daughters into the Harleys of Willey, Shropshire and a son and daughter into the Erdingtons. Sir Roger, who was the third and final heir, was deeply invested in his sister's marriage, not least because he was married to his own sister-in-law, Margaret Erdington. Hence the case was protracted and strongly contested by the Corbets and Erdingtons, although the inquisition following Sir Robert's death in 1375 had recognised that Elizabeth, now over 18, was his heir in blood. In 1382 Thomas and Margaret Erdington were still prevaricating and prolonging matters by failing to turn up for court hearings. Ultimately the manor was to pass to the son of Margaret and Thomas, the younger Thomas Erdington, and the Erdingtons were to remain tenants there until the last of their line died, sine prole, in 1467.

An order to the escheator of Shropshire on 13 July 1382 shows that Ipstones had initiated further proceedings after the death of Lady Elizabeth Corbet, Sir Robert's widow, to secure her jointure properties. This included the manor of Bessford and smaller estates at Shawbury in Shropshire and the manor of Bausley in Montgomeryshire, which Sir Robert's inquisition had recognised as jointly held by him and his wife and due to pass to the heirs of their bodies. It is certain this action was successful, as these properties were handed over to Elizabeth after Ipstones was killed in 1394.

=== Further claims ===
Ipstones was to make strenuous efforts to gain further land at Tean and Hopton, which he claimed by right of his mother. However, there was another claimant: Maud Swynnerton, a cousin who was still a child. Initially, in 1381, Ipstones simply seized the manors with the help of Richard Thornbury and John Wollaston. However, this dispute, was to be even more bitter and protracted.

== Political and military career ==
=== War service and political advancement ===
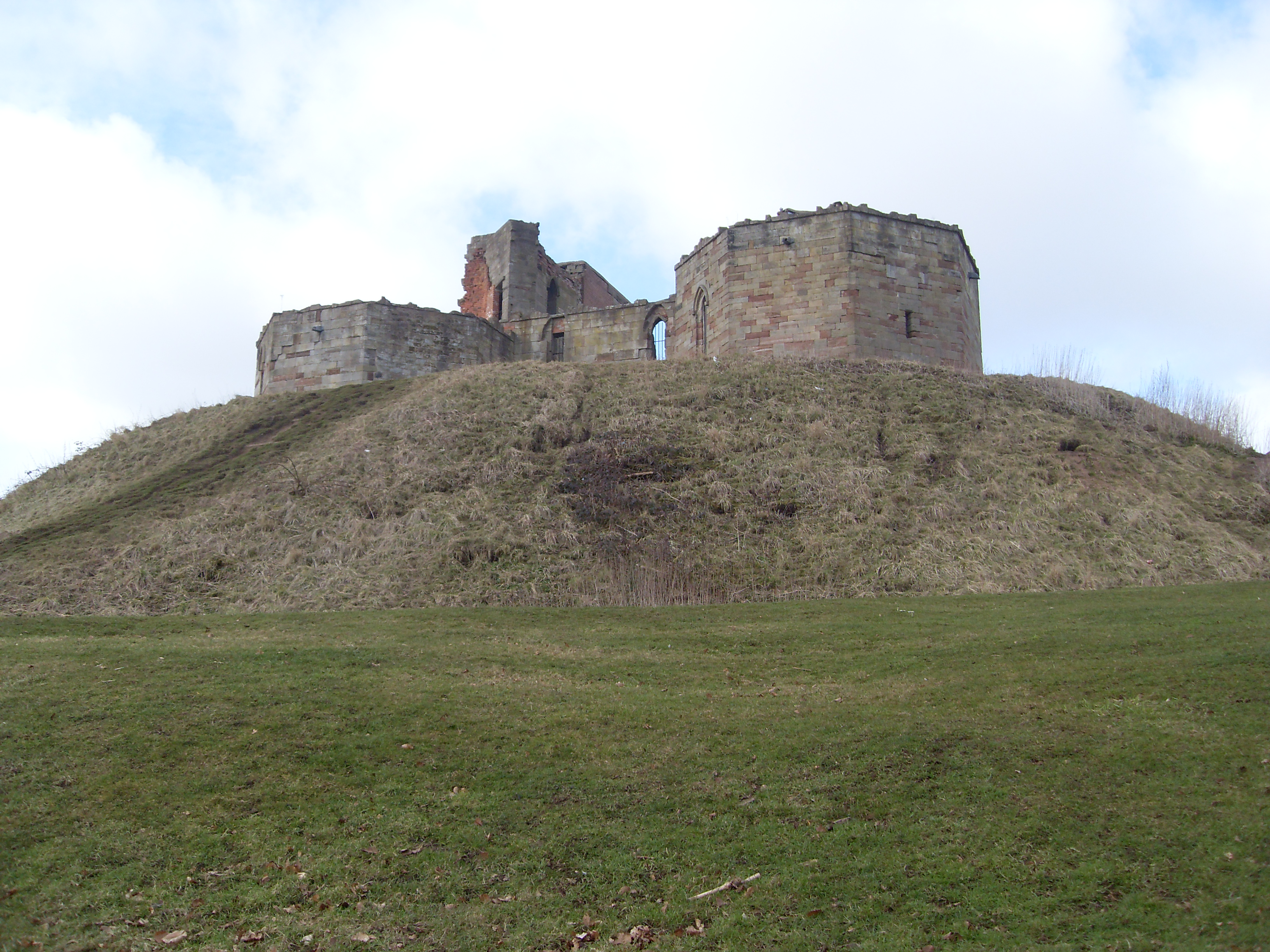
Remains of Stafford Castle, the Stafford family's great fortress, built in the mid-14th century, to the west of the town.

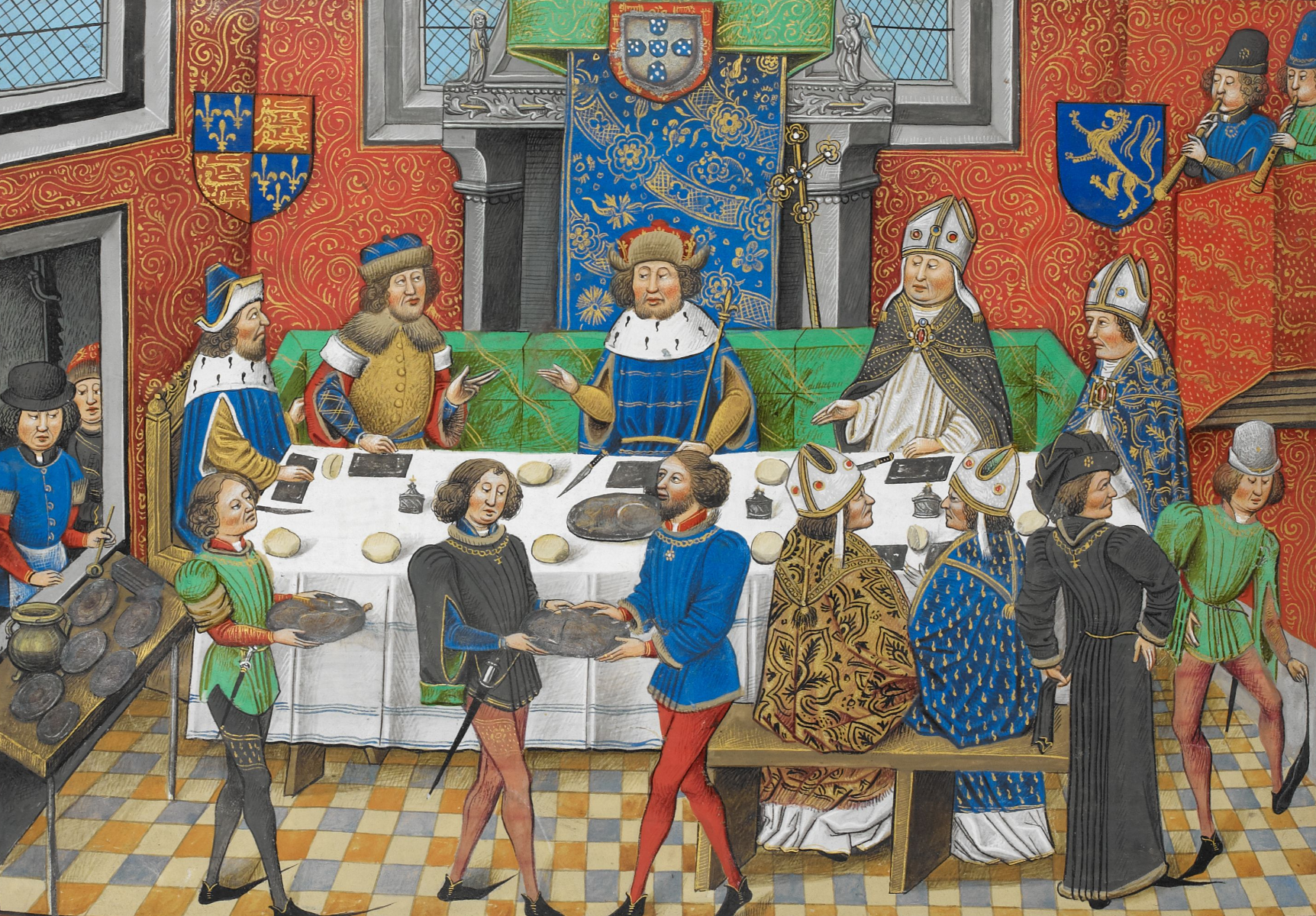
John of Gaunt dines with John I of Portugal during the Castilian expedition.

In 1373, shortly after his marriage, Ipstones enlisted in the retinue of Hugh de Stafford, 2nd Earl of Stafford. He was issued on 14 June with letters of protection for one year to accompany the earl on an expedition to France. This allied Ipstones to the most powerful magnate in the county. By 1376 he had been knighted. However, he seems quickly to have soured the relationship. At Easter 1381 Stafford sued him for a series of outrages committed by him and a group of his cronies, including Richard Thornbury, at Bradshaw, one of the earl's properties near Stafford. It was alleged that the gang had killed five oxen, stolen a horse and beaten Ameline, a servant so badly that she was unable to work for some time.

On 6 January 1386 Ipstones was one of the local gentry appointed alongside the Abbot of Darley to take over the finances of Rocester Abbey, which had fallen into indiscipline and administrative chaos. The letters patent authorising the committee were revoked a month later, but his appointment suggests he had gained some political traction. When Ipstones next ventured overseas it was in the retinue of John of Gaunt, the uncle and most important supporter of the young king. A letter of protection was issued in March 1386 for Ipstones to accompany Gaunt in his attempt to win the Crown of Castile, which he claimed by right of his wife, Constance of Castile. The expedition set off in July 1386, landing at A Coruña, and fought two inconclusive and costly campaigns against John I of Castile, Constance's cousin, before Gaunt came to terms with his enemy. Ipstones must have served at least competently, as Gaunt formally retained him in 1387 for £10 per annum. Gaunt transferred his attention to Gascony, where he remained until 1389. Ipstones must have parted company with him by the autumn of 1387, as he was granted a pardon on 13 November for killing Richard Thornbury, his own henchman. Gaunt was thus away from England during the momentous political events of 1386–88, while Ipstones was able to play a part.

=== The Merciless Parliament ===
In November 1386 the Lords Appellant had seized power, with the aim of removing the king's favourites and forestalling peace overtures to France. It is possible that Gaunt's influence helped Ipstones avoid punishment for murder but he was soon taking up a position clearly opposed to both Gaunt and the king. He pursued a quarrel with Sir Walter Blount, a veteran of Gaunt's campaigns and his main representative in the region, as well as chamberlain of the Duke's household. Blount became a Justice of the Peace in Derbyshire in December 1387 and rode to Repton with a large armed band to arrest John Moston, one of Ipstones' tenants who had attacked one of his own. The townspeople concealed Moston and refused to surrender him, as he had already posted surety for his future behaviour. Blount initially wavered, but returned three days later and took a further bond from Moston for £10. Ipstones and a large group of his armed men attacked Sir Walter's seat at Barton Blount and he was forced to surrender the bond, a humiliation for Blount and an embarrassment for Gaunt, who had been arguing in parliament that the great lords' affinities were a force for order.

Ipstones was returned as a knight of the shire to the parliament, which was called after the Lords Appellant defeated the king's supporters at the Battle of Radcot Bridge in December 1387 and assembled in February 1388. Ipstones seems to have been a willing participant in the purge carried out by this so-called Merciless Parliament of the king's closest associates, many of whom were executed. The expenses of the Staffordshire MPs, Ipstones and Roger Logridge, came to £44 8s. For the 111 days of the parliament, signed off on 4 June.

With his attendance at parliament, Ipstones was suddenly trusted to help in the task of restoring law and order in his region. In February 1388 he was one of a party deputed to bring to justice an armed group, centred on Ashbourne, Derbyshire, which was alleged to have plotted an ambush of John of Gaunt's officials. However, the leader of this group was actually Sir John Cokayne, whose family were close allies of Gaunt but who was nevertheless taking advantage of an opportunity to loot the duke's lands Cokayne soon appeared alongside Iptones in his own depredations. In April Ipstones was deputed with other local worthies to investigate the murder of Richard Round at Newcastle-under-Lyme. In July he received a commission of oyer and terminer to deal with serious disorder at Lichfield, where Richard le Scrope, Bishop of Lichfield and Coventry's manorial court had been assaulted and dispersed.

One of those attainted and sentenced to death by the Merciless Parliament was Robert de Vere, Duke of Ireland, who had commanded the royalist forces at Radcot Bridge, but made good his escape abroad immediately after the battle. Ipstones was one of four commissioned on 16 July 1389 to carry out an inquiry into de Vere's forfeited goods and chattels which had been concealed in Shropshire and Staffordshire. The others were Philip Sir Okeover, John Wollaston and John de Aston, all Ipstone's cronies in his acts of disorder. The four were granted a further commission in the same terms on 22 January 1390. The aftermath of the Merciless Parliament was now clearing, however, and the balance of power began to swing back towards the king with Gaunt back in the country. Ipstones was not to sit in parliament again until 1394. This time his political career and his property disputes were to intersect, with fatal consequences.

== Dispute with the Swynnertons ==
A dispute between Ipstones and the Swynnerton family had been simmering alongside his rise to relative political prominence. He had occupied Tean and Hopton in 1381, claiming them in his mother's right, and simply expelling the occupant, Maud or Matilda Swynnerton, a granddaughter of Sir Nicholas Beck, and thus his own cousin once removed. Maud was backed by her father-in-law, Sir Richard Peshale, who had a grudge against the Ipstones family, dating back to the death of his father Adam at the hands of the elder John Ipstones in 1346. Moreover, the Peshales were clients of the Earls of Stafford, suspicious of Gaunt since he intervened to get Sir John Holland restored to favour after he murdered the son of Hugh de Stafford, 2nd Earl of Stafford in 1386. There was a third dimension to the conflict within the Corbet family, as Sir Richard Peshale's brother and henchman Hamon Peshale was married to Alicia Harley, a first cousin of Elizabeth Corbet, and part of the group within the Corbet family which had opposed Ipstones earlier. Sir Richard arraigned an Assize of novel disseisin relating to the estates at Tean and Hopton, and also tenements at Blythewood, which was authorised by the king at Reading on 12 August. The justices nominated for the trial were Robert Tresilian, who was to be lynched during the rule of the Lords Appellant, and David Hanmer, the father-in-law of Owain Glyndŵr. At the same time the king authorised Maud's own assize concerning the carucate of land and messuage at Blythewood. The case was heard at Stafford during Michaelmas term. Ipstones' contended that the assize could not go ahead because Maud was illegitimate, presumably implying that her parents were within the forbidden degrees of consanguinity. Maud stated that she was under age and that Ipstones had accepted a writ that called her John Swynnerton's daughter, implying that he recognised her legitimacy. Henry Brown, a clerk of the court, was appointed to represent Maud. After several adjournments, both parties at last appeared in court about a year later, when it was decided the question of Maud's legitimacy would have to be settled. However, this was an ecclesiastical matter, so a mandate was sent to the Bishop of Coventry and Lichfield to investigate and judge the issue, reporting back at Easter 1383. Maud did not appear in court for four successive days and her suit was dismissed.

However, Ipstones continued to hold the disputed estates and in 1386 was offered £1000 as a recognizance by Sir Richard, apparently as part of an out-of-court settlement. However, the money was not forthcoming before Sir Richard died in 1388. Maud was now widowed and living with Joan Peshale, Sir Richard's widow at La Mote, a house within Chetwynd Park in Shropshire. Ipstones had killed his regular accomplice Thornbury in 1387 and he enlisted the help of Sir Philip Okeover of Okeover Hall, a professional soldier and veteran of Gaunt's French and Spanish campaigns Other new friends were Sir John Cokayne and Sir Thomas Beck. All of these were members of the Lancastrian affinity: Gaunt's policy of selecting men who were well-suited to war or court had unintended repercussions on civil society. In December they raised a force and abducted Maud from Chetwynd, stealing additional weapons from the house, although they were said to be already "armed as for war." Maud was forced to marry William Ipstones, Sir John's son, and induced formally to withdraw her claim to the disputed lands. Ipstones also initiated legal action to take possession of the Peshale estates until his money was paid. The Swynnertons and Peshales sought redress. Ironically, it was the widow Joan who was cautioned in May 1390 "to find security that she should do or procure no hurt or harm to John de Ipstones knight." However, she responded with a court action of her own. A commission of oyer and terminer was set up in June 1391 to investigate her allegation that Ipstones and his gang had threatened her, assaulted her servants and stolen property worth £100, as well as abducting both Maud and a maidservant, Alice Costeyne. Ipstones, Okeover and the rest were committed for trial at Shrewsbury and for a time held in the gaol at Shrewsbury Castle. However, the jury found them not guilty, probably because of intimidation.

In view of his own earlier allegation of Maud's illegitimacy, Ipstones secured a papal mandate dispensing with the problem that the marriage of Maud to his son fell within the prohibited degrees of consanguinity, as they shared a great-grandfather.

To the bishop of Lichfield. Mandate, at the petition also of king Richard, to absolve, a salutary penance being imposed, William de Hypsconys, donsel, and Matilda Swyninton, alias Pesal, damsel, from the sentence of excommunication which they have incurred by marrying in a certain private chapel, and without banns, knowing that they were related on both sides in the third degree of kindred. They are to be separated for a time, and are then to be dispensed to remarry, past and future offspring being declared legitimate. Whichever of the two survive the other shall remain perpetually unwed.

== Death ==
Ipstones was elected MP for Staffordshire in the 21st parliament of Richard II, which assembled on 27 January 1394. In February, while travelling unarmed through London to a session of Parliament, Ipstones was murdered by Roger Swynnerton, a relative of Maud. The details are given in his murderer's pardon. Ipstones was entitled to have his sword carried by an attendant: in this case it was a man called John Joce. He was staying at the time in his own house in Walbrook. Roger Swynnerton, with three servants and others, were staying near St John's Church, "without Smithfield", presumably Clerkenwell Priory. They intercepted and attacked Ipstones and his servant in a lane opposite the Hospital of St Mary Rouncivall, which was near Charing Cross. It seems that Ipstones fled but was pursued and killed.

The escheator was instructed to take control of the Ipstones estates on the king's behalf on 10 March. As the MP had not held any lands as a tenant-in-chief, the escheator was ordered to release his estates and any income from the interim period to his son and heir, William Ipstones, as early as 12 March.

As an MP attending Parliament, Ipstones was under royal protection. However, he had done little to win affection in the court and it seems that his murderer was well-connected in royalist circles. It was Baldwin Raddington, controller of the king's wardrobe, who obtained a pardon for Swynnerton in June 1397. At that point Raddington was coming to the close of an unprecedented 16-year term of office in which he had been immensely influential. He had been a protégé of Simon de Burley, one of Richard II's closest advisors, executed by the Merciless Parliament, but had survived to build a strong bodyguard around the king. He had been controller of London when its municipal institutions were suspended in 1392. As a particularly close and trusted adviser of the king, his actions probably indicated the feelings of the court towards Ipstones and it also illustrated the limits to Gaunt's power, particularly the protection he could offer.

== Continuing disputes ==
Ipstones left a bitter heritage of family disputes over property, which seem to have led to exhaustion of the parties concerned and loss of some estates. In 1396 William Ipstones, acting in Maud's name, sought to gain an estate in Cheshire, part of the Beck inheritance: on 12 November the case was referred to Thomas de Mowbray, the Justice of Chester. The following year William sued his mother for waste and destruction of his inheritance at Hopton and Blymhill, where she held 20 houses and 200 acres as her jointure. He alleged that she had sold marl and clay, cut down trees, and damaged the tenants' houses.

When William died, Maud ignored the papal prohibition on her remarriage to take as husband John Savage. Elizabeth, the widow of John Ipstones, had meanwhile remarried into the Peshale family. The Hopton estate had descended to Maud and William's daughters, Christiana and Alice. Unable to obtain a re-let of Hopton manor from her daughters, Maud simply moved into the property, until Elizabeth took it back. In July 1401 Maud and Savage initiated proceedings against Elizabeth and the court ordered her to restore the estate to them. Two years later, however, Elizabeth sued them for arrears of rent of 17 annual marks for the manor. They were forced to agree to pay in return for an advance of £20 from Elizabeth. They seem to have begun the process of withdrawing from the Covedale estates, selling their share of the advowson at Munslow to John Burley in 1404.

However, the dispute began a fresh chapter with the next generation. In 1419 Alice and her husband, Ralph Brereton, started proceedings against Elizabeth for 21 years' rent arrears: a total, they claimed, of 420 marks. In 1423 they sued her for wasting their properties in Staffordshire. They seem to have sold up in Corvedale, as Aston and Munslow were in the hands of Lord Talbot, William Burley and William Baldwyn in 1428.

== Marriage and family ==
Ipstones married Elizabeth Corbet, daughter of Thomas Corbet and niece of Sir Roger Corbet by Easter 1374. The Corbets were an important Shropshire gentry family with a strong tradition of parliamentary service. Only one son, William, is known and he died a few years after his father. Elizabeth Corbet survived Ipstones by some decades.

== See also ==
- Bastard feudalism
- Corbet family

== Footnotes ==
Parliament of England
Preceded by Sir William Shareshull; Aymer Lichfield	Member of Parliament for Staffordshire; 1388 (February); With: Roger Longridge	Succeeded by Sir Thomas Aston; John Delves
Preceded by Sir Thomas Aston; William Walsall	Member of Parliament for Staffordshire; 1394; With: William Walsall	Succeeded by Sir William Shareshull; Aymer Lichfield
