= Corbet baronets of Leighton (1642) =

Escutcheon of the Corbet baronets of Leighton

The Corbet baronetcy, of Leighton in the County of Montgomery, was created in the Baronetage of England on 20 June 1642 for Edward Corbet. The 2nd and 4th Baronets both represented Shrewsbury in Parliament. The title is believed to have become extinct on the latter's death in 1774; but it was assumed by self-styled 5th and 6th Baronets, to 1808.

== Corbet baronets, of Leighton (1642) ==
- Sir Edward Corbet, 1st Baronet (died 1655)
- Sir Richard Corbet, 2nd Baronet (1640–1683)
- Sir Uvedale Corbet, 3rd Baronet (1668–1701)
- Sir Richard Corbet, 4th Baronet (1696–1774)
