= Corbet baronets of Moreton Corbet (second creation, 1808) =

Arms of Corbet Baronets of Moreton Corbet, cr. 1808: Or, a raven sable

The Corbet baronetcy, of Moreton Corbet in the County of Shropshire and of Linslade in the County of Buckingham, was created in the Baronetage of the United Kingdom on 3 October 1828 for Andrew Corbet. He was a descendant of Richard Corbet of Shawbury, brother of Sir Vincent Corbet, 1st Baronet of the 1642 creation.

The title became extinct on the death of the 7th Baronet in 1996.

== Corbet baronets of Moreton Corbet (1808; second creation) ==
- Sir Andrew Corbet, 1st Baronet (1766–1835)
- Sir Andrew Vincent Corbet, 2nd Baronet (1800–1855)
- Sir Vincent Rowland Corbet, 3rd Baronet (1821–1891)
- Sir Walter Orlando Corbet, 4th Baronet (1856–1910)
- Sir Roland James Corbet, 5th Baronet (1892–1915)
- Sir Gerald Vincent Corbet, 6th Baronet (1868–1955)
- Sir John Vincent Corbet, 7th Baronet (1911–1996)

== Notes ==
Baronetage of the United Kingdom
| Preceded by Tyrwhitt baronets | Corbet baronets of Moreton Corbet; 3 October 1808 | Succeeded by Wood baronets |
