= Corbet baronets of Sprowston (1623) =

Escutcheon of the Corbet baronets of Sprowston

The Corbet baronetcy, of Sprowston in the County of Norfolk, was created in the Baronetage of England on 4 July 1623 for John Corbet, of Sprowston. He was son of Sir Thomas Corbet, Kt, High Sheriff of Norfolk in 1612. He sat as Member of Parliament for Norfolk and Yarmouth. He was the elder brother of the regicide Miles Corbet. The title became extinct on the death of the third Baronet in 1661.

== Corbet baronets, of Sprowston (1623) ==
- Sir John Corbet, 1st Baronet (1591–1628)
- Sir John Corbet, 2nd Baronet (died before 1649)
- Sir Thomas Corbet, 3rd Baronet (died 1661)
