= Corbet baronets of Stoke upon Tern (second creation, 1786) =

The Corbet baronetcy, of Stoke upon Tern in the County of Shropshire, was created in the Baronetage of Great Britain on 27 June 1786 for Corbet Corbet. Born Corbet D'Avenant, he was the son of Anne Corbet, daughter of the fourth Baronet of the 1627 creation. He was heir to his uncle the 6th Baronet of the 1627 creation and changed his surname to Corbet under the terms of his uncle's will upon inheritance. The title became extinct on his death in 1823.

== Corbet baronets, of Stoke upon Tern (1786; second creation) ==
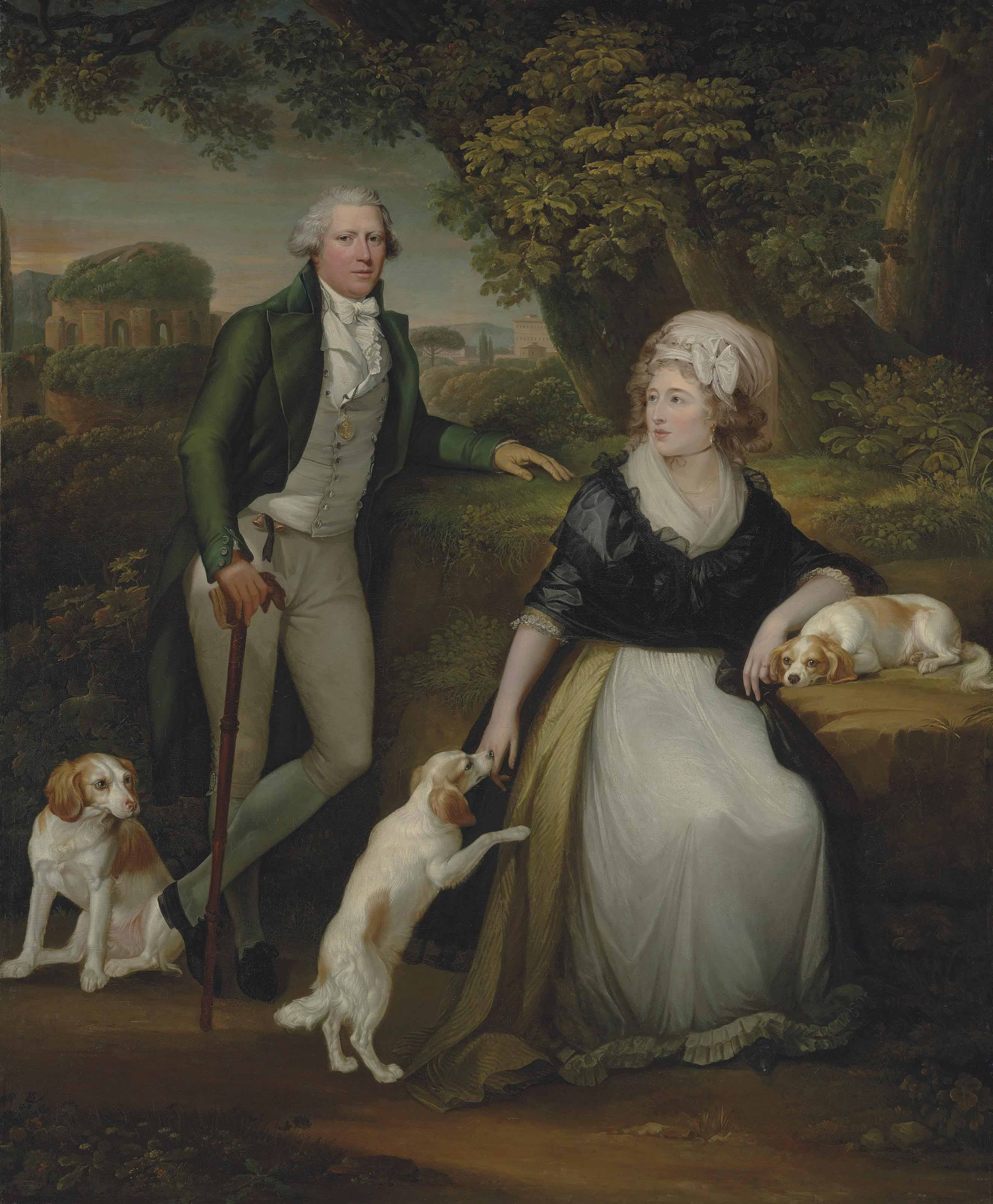
Sir Corbet Corbet, Bt., of Stoke on Trent (1752-1823), and his wife Hester, painting by Robert Fagan, 1790s.

- Sir Corbet Corbet, 1st Baronet (1752–1823). He married in 1772 Hester Salusbury Cotton, youngest daughter of Sir Lynch Cotton, 4th Baronet, but died without issue.

== Coat of arms ==
Coat of arms of Corbet baronets of Stoke upon Tern
Escutcheon Or, a raven sable.

== Notes ==
Baronetage of Great Britain
Preceded by Rowley baronets	Corbet baronets of Stoke upon Tern; 27 June 1786	Succeeded by Vane-Fletcher baronets
