= Corbet baronets of Stoke upon Tern (first creation, 1627) =

Escutcheon of the Corbet baronets of Stoke upon Tern

The Corbet baronetcy, of Stoke upon Tern in the County of Shropshire, was created in the Baronetage of England on 19 September 1627 for John Corbet.

The 1st Baronet represented Shropshire in the Long Parliament, from 1640 to 1648. The 4th Baronet also represented this constituency in the House of Commons while the 5th Baronet represented both Montgomery and Ludlow.

The title became extinct on the death of the 6th Baronet in 1750. There was a second creation in 1786 for his nephew.

== Corbet baronets of Stoke upon Tern (1627; first creation) ==
- Sir John Corbet, 1st Baronet (1594–1662)
- Sir John Corbet, 2nd Baronet (c. 1620–1665)
- Sir John Corbet, 3rd Baronet (c. 1645–1695)
- Sir Robert Corbet, 4th Baronet (c. 1670–1740)
- Sir William Corbet, 5th Baronet (1702–1748)
- Sir Henry Corbet, 6th Baronet (died 1750)
