= Corbet baronets of Moreton Corbet (first creation, 1642) =

Escutcheon of the Corbet baronets of Moreton Corbet

The Corbet baronetcy, of Moreton Corbet in the County of Shropshire, was created in the Baronetage of England on 29 January 1642 for the Royalist Vincent Corbet. Both he (April–May 1640) and the second Baronet sat as Members of Parliament for Shropshire.

The title became extinct on the death of the 3rd Baronet in 1688. There was a second creation in 1828 for a collateral descendant of the 1st Baronet.

== Corbet baronets, of Moreton Corbet (1642; first creation) ==
- Sir Vincent Corbet, 1st Baronet (1617–1656). Sarah, Lady Corbet, his widow, daughter and coheir of Sir Robert Monson, was created Viscountess Corbet for life in the Peerage of England in 1679.
- Sir Vincent Corbet, 2nd Baronet (c.1642–1681)
- Sir Vincent Corbet, 3rd Baronet (1670–1688)
