= Peplow Hall =

18th-century mansion in Shropshire, England

Coordinates: 52°49′05″N 02°32′15″W

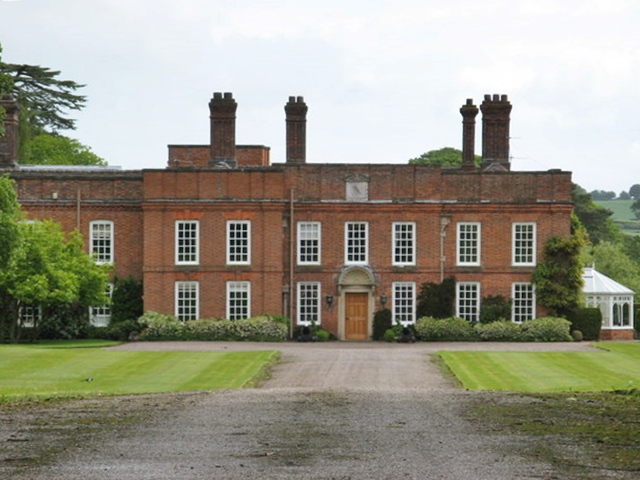
Peplow Hall

Peplow Hall is a privately owned 11,635 square feet (1,080.9 m^{2}), 18th-century mansion at Peplow, near Hodnet, Shropshire. It is a Grade II* listed building.

== History ==
Before 1715 the manor at Peplow had been owned variously by the de Ludlow and Vernon families. In 1715 the manor was sold by Sir Richard Vernon to his steward Hugh Pigot. Pigot replaced the old manor house with a new hall in about 1725, which date is carried on the sundials adorning the central block of the present house. His grandson, Sir George Pigot Bt (1719–1783) the first of the Pigot Baronets, purchased Patshull Hall and sold Peplow to the Clegg family.

In 1831 Anne Clegg, then heiress of the estate, married Rowland Hill of Hawkstone Hall who later in 1842 succeeded to the title Viscount Hill. Hill experienced financial difficulties and in 1873 sold the estate to wealthy industrialist, coal owner and ironmaster Francis Stanier.

Stanier created the present house in 1877 by greatly enlarging the 1725 house. The estate then extended to some 4,000 acres (16 km^{2}) but was reduced by sales in the 20th century and in the 1920s the house and remaining land were offered for sale. He also kept a collection of stuffed animals at the estate, which included crocodiles and leopards.

The house was substantially reduced in size in 1932. From about 1945 until 1963 the property was owned by Neville Howard Rollason, a director of the steelmaker John Summers and Sons at Shotton, and after his death it was sold to William B Higgin, son of a Liverpool cotton merchant who had been High Sheriff of Cheshire. Higgin sold the estate to Michael Wynn, 7th Baron Newborough.

The hall is no longer the seat of the 8th Baron Newborough, having been sold in 2015.

During 2015, the property was marketed for £2.75m (this lower figure was reduced during the marketing).

== Chapel of the Epiphany ==
The Chapel of the Epiphany is a Church of England chapel situated in the hamlet.

Francis Stanier commissioned the chapel in 1877, with it being designed by Richard Norman Shaw. For the next 74 years the chapel remained part of the Stanier family's property, when in 1951 it was passed to the Diocese of Lichfield. The interior of the Chapel still holds many references to the Stanier family.

== See also ==
- Grade II* listed buildings in Shropshire Council (H–Z)
- Listed buildings in Hodnet, Shropshire
