= Palestine (poem) =

1803 poem by Reginald Heber

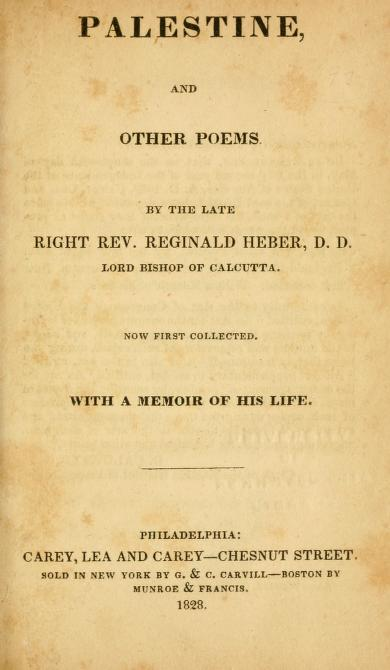
Cover of an 1828 American publication

Palestine is an 1803 romantic long poem by noted clergyman Reginald Heber, successfully entered for the Newdigate Prize.

== Background ==
Heber had been helped in this composition by Sir Walter Scott, a family friend, before the future novelist's years of fame. They'd had a discussion over breakfast about Palestine, and he began writing it before he left the table. When Heber declaimed the poem at that year's Encaenia ceremony at the Sheldonian Theatre, it was given an enthusiastic reception. The poem was later published, and in 1812 was set to music by the composer William Crotch as an oratorio. Crotch had been professor of music at Oxford since 1797.

== Reception ==
"None who heard Reginald Heber recite his ‘ Palestine’ in that magnificent theatre, will ever forget his appearance-so interesting and impressive. It was known that his old father was somewhere sitting among the crowded audience, when his universally admired son ascended the rostrum; and we have heard that the sudden thunder of applause which then arose so shook his frame, weak and wasted by long illness, that he never recovered it, and may be said to have died of the joy dearest to a parent's heart." —Charles E. Grey on Heber's recital of Palestine at the Sheldonian Theatre.

Montefiore, writing in 1902, described the poem as "the most successful and popular piece of religious verse of the first half of the [19th] century". A later biographer, Derrick Hughes, finds its contemporary acclaim puzzling: "It is not a good, not even a mediocre poem; it is leaden". In the United States it was published as Palestine and other poems, and also included memoirs of Heber's life.
