= The Man Who Would Be King (film) =

1975 epic historical adventure film by John Huston

- Theatrical release poster by Tom Jung
- Directed by: John Huston
- Written by: John Huston; Gladys Hill
- Based on: The Man Who Would Be King (1888 novella) by Rudyard Kipling
- Produced by: John Foreman
- Starring: Sean Connery; Michael Caine; Christopher Plummer; Saeed Jaffrey; Shakira Caine
- Cinematography: Oswald Morris
- Edited by: Russell Lloyd
- Music by: Maurice Jarre
- Production companies: Allied Artists; Columbia Pictures; Devon Company; Persky-Bright Associates
- Distributed by: Allied Artists (U.S./Canada); Columbia Pictures (International)
- Release dates: 26 November 1975 (Tehran); 17 December 1975 (New York); 19 December 1975 (London)
- Running time: 129 minutes
- Country: United States; United Kingdom
- Language: English
- Budget: $8.5 million
- Box office: $11 million

The Man Who Would Be King is a 1975 epic historical adventure film directed by John Huston, adapted by Huston and Gladys Hill from Rudyard Kipling's 1888 novella. It stars Sean Connery and Michael Caine in the leading roles, two rogue ex-soldiers who set off from late-19th-century British India in search of adventure and end up in faraway Kafiristan, modern-day Afghanistan, where one is taken for a god and made their king. The supporting cast includes Saeed Jaffrey, Shakira Caine and Christopher Plummer as Kipling (giving a name to the novella's anonymous narrator).

An adaptation of Kipling's novella was a longtime passion project for director Huston, with development beginning in the late-1950s, and Clark Gable and Humphrey Bogart in mind for the leading roles. Shooting took place on-location in Morocco and France, and at Pinewood Studios in England. The musical score was composed by Maurice Jarre.

The Man Who Would Be King premiered at the 1975 Tehran International Film Festival, and was released in the United States on December 17. It received positive reviews from critics, who praised Huston's direction and the performances of Connery and Caine. It was also a commercial success.

The film was nominated for four Oscars at the 48th Academy Awards, including Best Adapted Screenplay. Both Connery and Caine have considered the movie their favorite of all they had worked on.

== Plot ==
In 1885 British India, journalist Rudyard Kipling is approached by a ragged derelict who reveals himself to be Peachy Carnehan, an old acquaintance. Carnehan reveals what happened to him and his comrade-in-arms, Danny Dravot, both ex-sergeants of the British Army.

Three years earlier, Dravot and Carnehan had met Kipling. After stealing his pocket-watch, Carnehan found a masonic tag on the chain and, realising he had robbed a fellow Freemason, felt he had to return it. Carnehan and Dravot were working on a plot to blackmail a local raja, which Kipling foiled by getting the British district commissioner to intervene. Carnehan later blackmails the commissioner to avoid deportation.

Frustrated at the lack of opportunities for lucrative criminal mischief, in an India becoming more civilised, and with few prospects in the United Kingdom, the two visit Kipling with a plan. Forsaking India, they will head with twenty rifles and ammunition to Kafiristan, a country virtually unknown to Europeans since its conquest by Alexander the Great. There they will offer their services to a ruler and help him conquer his neighbours, but proceed to overthrow him and loot the country. Kipling, after first trying to dissuade them, gives Dravot his masonic tag as a token of brotherhood.

After signing a contract pledging mutual loyalty and forswearing women and drink, Carnehan and Dravot set off on an overland journey north beyond the Khyber Pass. Over the following weeks, they travel through Afghanistan, fighting off bandits, blizzards and avalanches. They chance upon Gurkha soldier Billy Fish, the sole survivor of a years-past British expedition. Speaking English and the local language, Billy smooths their way as they begin their rise, first offering their services to the chief of a much-raided village. When a force has been trained in modern weapons and tactics, they lead it out against some hated neighbours. During the battle, an arrow pierces Dravot's jacket but he is unharmed.

Both sides take Dravot to be a god, though in fact the arrowhead was stopped by his bandolier. Victory follows victory, with the defeated adding to the ranks of the swelling army. With their enemies vanquished, nobody is left to stand in their way, as they are summoned to the holy city of Sikandergul by the local high priest. The priest sets up a re-enactment of the arrow incident, to determine whether Dravot is a man or a god by seeing whether or not he bleeds. When his shirt is torn open, they are amazed to see the masonic tag around his neck. It contains the sacred symbol left by Sikander, their name for Alexander the Great, who had promised to send a son to rule over them.

Hailing Dravot as king as well as god, the locals show him the royal treasury, which is full of gold and jewels that are now all his. Carnehan suggests that they leave with as much loot as they can carry. Dravot, however, is beginning to enjoy the adulation of the locals, settling their disputes and issuing laws, and even dreams of visiting Queen Victoria as an equal. He is also smitten with the beautiful young Roxanne, saying he will marry her to leave the people an heir. When Roxanne is reluctantly brought to him, he tries to kiss her, but she, terrified that the touch of a god means death to a mortal, bites his cheek. Seeing him bleed, the people realise he is only human and try to grab the British impostors.

Outnumbered in the ensuing battle, Dravot is captured and is made to walk onto a rope bridge, where he sings the hymn "The Son of God Goes Forth to War." When the ropes are cut, he falls to his death. Carnehan tells Kipling that he was crucified between two pine trees but freed upon being found still alive the next morning. Crippled in body and unhinged in mind from his ordeal, he returned to India as a beggar. Finishing his story, he leaves Kipling's office after putting a bundle on the desk. Kipling opens it and finds Dravot's skull, still wearing a golden crown.

== Cast ==
- Sean Connery as Daniel Dravot
- Michael Caine as Peachy Carnehan
- Christopher Plummer as Rudyard Kipling
- Saeed Jaffrey as Machendra Bahadur "Billy Fish" Gurung
- Shakira Caine as Roxanne
- Doghmi Larbi as Ootah
- Jack May as District Commissioner
- Karroom Ben Bouih as Kafu Selim
- Mohammad Shamsi as Babu
- Albert Moses as Ghulam
- Paul Antrim as Mulvaney
- Graham Acres as Officer
- PJ Retiree as Chief
- The Blue Dancers of Goulamine as Dancers

== Production ==
=== Development ===
The Man Who Would Be King had been a pet project of John Huston's for decades after he had read the book as a child. Huston had planned to make the film since the 1950s, originally with Clark Gable and Humphrey Bogart in the roles of Daniel and Peachy. He was unable to get the project off the ground before Bogart died in 1957; Gable followed in 1960. Burt Lancaster and Kirk Douglas were then approached to play the leads, followed by Richard Burton and Peter O'Toole. In the 1970s, Huston approached Robert Redford and Paul Newman for the roles. Newman advised Huston that British actors should play the roles, and it was he who recommended Connery and Caine. Caine was very keen to appear, especially after he was told that his part had originally been written for Humphrey Bogart, his favourite actor as a young man.

The role of Roxanne (the only listed female character in the movie) was originally slated for Tessa Dahl, the daughter of Roald Dahl and actress Patricia Neal. Dahl, excited to take the role, had prepared for the part by losing weight and capping her teeth. However, at the last minute, director Huston had decided to cast someone whose appearance was more in keeping with natives of Kafiristan. "We've got to find an Arab princess somewhere", he is recounted as saying over dinner with Caine. At that same dinner, Caine's Indian-descended wife Shakira was present, so Huston and Caine persuaded her to take on the role.

=== Filming ===
Principal photography lasted from January 9 to April 3, 1975. The exteriors were filmed primarily in Morocco, with the mountain scenes filmed in Chamonix, France. The scenes set at the capital city of Kafiristan were shot at Aït Benhaddou. A battle scene was filmed at the Kasbah of Tifoultoute. The Todgha Gorge doubled for the Khyber Pass. Other locations included Marrakesh, Ouarzazate, and the High Atlas mountains. Interiors were shot at Pinewood Studios.

While on location, Caine strongly objected to an assistant director's racist treatment of Saeed Jaffrey, who played the Gurkha guide Billy Fish.

The stuntman Joe Powell doubled for Sean Connery and it was he who performed the fall from the rope bridge at the film's climax. Execution involved a potentially fatal fall of 80 feet onto a pile of cardboard boxes and mattresses. Huston was so impressed with Powell's performance he said, "That's the darndest stunt I've ever seen!" Caine said that Connery did not like heights and was not fond of the final scene in which he had to walk to the middle of the bridge. Caine recalled, "There was a day when we were shooting on the rope bridge and Sean turned to John and said "Do you think the bridge looks safe?" John lowered his eyes and said, "Sean, the bridge looks the way it always has. The only difference is that today, you're going to be standing in the middle of it."

=== Music ===
Maurice Jarre scored the film and invited classical Indian musicians to participate in the recording sessions with a traditional European symphony orchestra. A key song, which figures within the plot of the movie, is a fusion of the music of the Irish song "The Minstrel Boy" with the lyrics of Reginald Heber's "The Son of God Goes Forth to War". This song is heard at key moments in the score, notably being sung by Dravot as he is being executed and as he tumbles to his death. The film's performance of "The Minstrel Boy" is by William Lang, late of the Black Dyke Band and the London Symphony Orchestra.

== Release ==
The film premiered on 26 November 1975 at the Tehran International Film Festival. It opened on 17 December 1975 at the Coronet and Loew's Astor Plaza in New York City. It had a Royal premiere attended by Princess Anne at the Odeon Leicester Square in London on 18 December 1975 before opening to the public on the following day.

=== Home media ===
The Man Who Would Be King was released by CBS/Fox Video on laserdisc on 12 August 1993. Then was released by Warner Home Video (home video arm of Warner Bros., current owners of the Allied Artists library due to the 1989 acquisition of Lorimar-Telepictures) on DVD in Region 1 on 19 November 1997, and was re-issued on 9 November 2010, followed by a Region A Blu-ray release on 7 June 2011. In Region 2, the film was released on DVD by Sony Pictures Home Entertainment on 27 August 2007, with a re-issue on 17 May 2010.

== Reception ==
=== Critical response ===
John Simon of New York magazine considered the film to be Huston's best work since The African Queen, twenty-three years earlier. Jay Cocks of Time magazine wrote, "John Huston has been wanting to make this movie for more than twenty years. It was worth the wait. A mellow, brassy, vigorous movie, rich in adventure and melancholy, The Man Who Would Be King represents the best work Huston has done in a decade. Like The Treasure of the Sierra Madre (1947), The Man Who Would Be King is also a meditation on the excesses of ambition and avarice." Vincent Canby of The New York Times felt the film "manages to be great fun in itself while being most faithful to Kipling, whose story, written in the 1890's, is a kind of raffish metaphor for the British colonial experience that did not end for another half century."

Roger Ebert of the Chicago Sun-Times gave the film four stars, writing the film is a "swashbuckling adventure, pure and simple, and in the hands of a master. It's been a long time since there's been an escapist entertainment quite this unabashed and thrilling and fun ...We get strong characterizations, we get excitement and, best of all, we get to laugh every once in a while." Gene Siskel of the Chicago Tribune, who also gave the film four stars, praised the film as "a genuinely witty and literate adventure story ...that should appeal to the whole family. Kids over the age of 10 will enjoy being transported into another world of casbahs and camels; adults will be hooked by the witty dialog, much of it taken from its source, a Rudyard Kipling story." A review in Variety was critical of the film mostly because of Caine's performance, stating "Whether it was the intention of the director-adapter John Huston or not, the tale of action and adventure became a too-broad comedy, mostly due to the poor performance of Michael Caine".

On the review aggregator website Rotten Tomatoes, the film has a rating of 97% based on 34 reviews, with an average score of 8.5/10. Another review aggregator, Metacritic, calculated a score of 91 based on 15 reviews, indicating "universal acclaim". In 2019, in a ranking of Caine's filmography, Andrew Pulver of The Guardian selected the film as Caine's best-ever role. Both Connery and Caine have considered the film their favourite of all they had worked on.

British author Adam Roberts published a science fiction novel extrapolating from this movie, referencing the Star Trek alien race Klingons, as The Man Who Would Be Kling.

=== Awards and nominations ===
Institution	Date of ceremony	Category	Nominee(s)	Result
Academy Awards	29 March 1976	Best Screenplay Adapted from Other Material	John Huston, Gladys Hill	Nominated
Academy Awards	29 March 1976	Best Art Direction	Alexandre Trauner, Tony Inglis, Peter James	Nominated
Academy Awards	29 March 1976	Best Costume Design	Edith Head	Nominated
Academy Awards	29 March 1976	Best Film Editing	Russell Lloyd	Nominated
Golden Globe Awards	24 January 1976	Best Original Score	Maurice Jarre	Nominated
BAFTA Awards	17 March 1976	Best Cinematography	Oswald Morris	Nominated
BAFTA Awards	17 March 1976	Best Costume Design	Edith Head	Nominated
Valladolid International Film Festival	1976	Golden Spike	John Huston	Nominated
Writers Guild of America Awards	1976	Best Adapted Screenplay	John Huston	Nominated

== See also ==
- John Huston filmography
