= Peplow =

Hamlet in Shropshire, England

Coordinates: 52.816°N 2.550°W

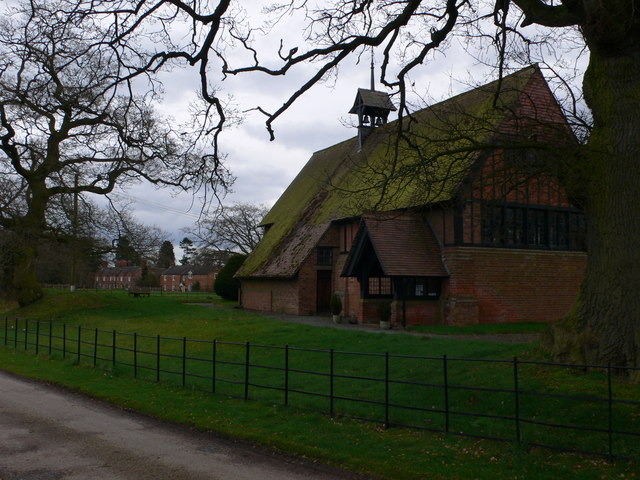
- The Chapel of the Epiphany, Peplow, designed by Richard Norman Shaw

- Location within Shropshire
- OS grid reference: SJ629245
- Civil parish: Hodnet
- Unitary authority: Shropshire
- Ceremonial county: Shropshire
- Region: West Midlands
- Country: England
- Sovereign state: United Kingdom
- Post town: MARKET DRAYTON
- Postcode district: TF9
- Dialling code: 01630
- Police: West Mercia
- Fire: Shropshire
- Ambulance: West Midlands
- UK Parliament: North Shropshire

Peplow is a hamlet in Shropshire, England. It is part of the civil parish of Hodnet, a larger village to the north. The hamlets of Bowling Green and Radmoor are both in the village's vicinity.

It lies in a rural area on the A442 road, between Crudgington and Hodnet, with Ollerton immediately to the east.

At the time of the Domesday survey, the manor of Peplow was held by Ranulph de Mortimer. The land later became part of the Hodnet estate, and was held by the Ludlow and Vernon families, until 1715 when it was sold to the Pigot family, who built Peplow Hall.

The hamlet is best known for Peplow Hall, an 18th-century manor house, and Peplow Mill. The mill contains an early water turbine dating from 1820 and spans the River Tern.

There is a cricket club called Hodnet and Peplow CC, and the club's badge is that of a gold lion (from the gates of Hodnet Hall), lying beneath a green beech tree (representing the beech trees lining the driveway of Peplow Hall). Its first eleven play in the Rollinson Smith Shropshire Cricket League Division 3.

== Transport ==
Peplow railway station was on the line from Wellington to Market Drayton operated by Great Western Railway. It opened in 1867 and closed in 1963. The former station building is now a private residence.

RAF Peplow is a former Royal Air Force air base near Child's Ercall. It operated from 1941 to 1949. It is named after Peplow (even though it is not the closest settlement) because Peplow's railway station was the closest station and servicemen would disembark from it and would walk to the air base.

== Peplow Hall ==
Peplow Hall is an 18th-century mansion in the hamlet. It is a Grade II* listed building.

The current building was constructed by Hugh Pigot, an ancestor of the Pigot Baronets, in 1725. His grandson, Sir George Pigot Bt, sold the estate to the Clegg family.

After passing to the Hill Family, in 1873 the Hall was sold to the industrialist Francis Stanier. As well as expanding the Hall, Francis Stanier is also believed to have brought a collection of stuffed animals to the Hall, including an emperor penguin, leopards, and at least one crocodile.

In 1877, work began on the Chapel of the Epiphany, with the building being designed by Richard Norman Shaw. The chapel remained in the Stanier family's possession until 1951, when it was passed to the Diocese of Lichfield.

In 1921, Sir Beville Stanier moved from the Hall to the Citadel, in Weston-under-Redcastle. In 1921, the Hall was sold, and in 1932 the south-east wing of the Hall was demolished. From some point during the Second World War, to 1963, the Hall was owned by Neville Howard Rollason, and from 1963 to 1978 the property was owned by William B Higgin.

In 1978 the Hall was sold to Michael Wynn, 7th Baron Newborough. in 2015, Robert Wynn, 8th Baron Newborough, sold the Estate.

== See also ==
- Listed buildings in Hodnet, Shropshire
