= St Luke's Church, Hodnet =

Coordinates: 52.8535°N 2.5770°W

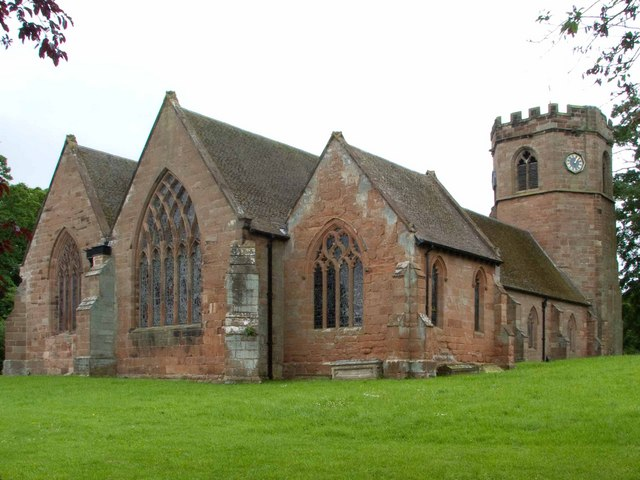
- St Luke's Church, Hodnet, from the northeast

- Location in Shropshire
- OS grid reference: SJ 612 286
- Location: Hodnet, Shropshire
- Country: England
- Denomination: Anglican
- Website: St Luke, Hodnet

History
- Status: Parish church

Architecture
- Functional status: Active
- Heritage designation: Grade I
- Architectural type: Church
- Style: Norman, Gothic, Gothic Revival

Specifications
- Materials: Sandstone, tile roofs

Administration
- Province: Canterbury
- Diocese: Lichfield
- Archdeaconry: Salop
- Deanery: Hodnet
- Parish: Hodnet

Clergy
- Rector: Revd Edith Quirey

St Luke's Church is in the village of Hodnet, Shropshire, England. It is an active Anglican parish church in the deanery of Hodnet, the archdeaconry of Salop, and the diocese of Lichfield. Its benefice is united with those of The Epiphany, Peplow, and St Luke, Weston under Redcastle. The church is recorded in the National Heritage List for England as a designated Grade I listed building. It overlooks the park of Hodnet Hall.

== History ==
The church originated in the 12th century, the nave of that church being the south aisle of the present church. In the 14th century the nave was remodelled by the addition of a chapel, and a wide north aisle, a chancel, and a tower were built. In 1846–47 the aisle and chapel were reconstructed by John Laing, and in 1870 a burial chapel was added to the north of the church. In 1883 the church was remodelled, the north aisle being converted to form the nave and chancel, and the former nave becoming the south aisle.

== Architecture ==
=== Exterior ===
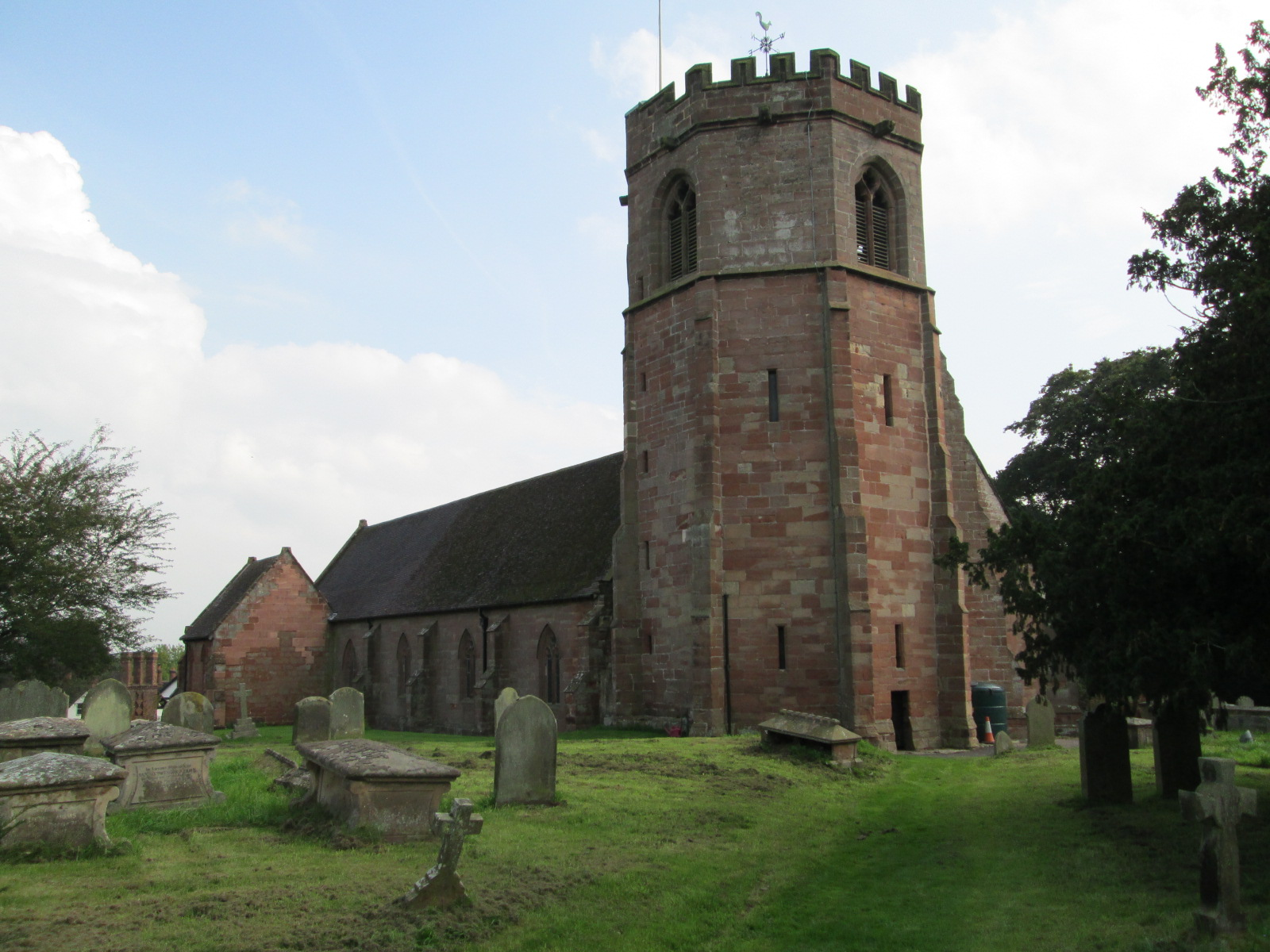
The octagonal tower of the church

St Luke's is constructed in sandstone with tile roofs. Its plan consists of a five-bay nave and south aisle, a two-bay chancel with a south chapel, a south porch and vestry, a chapel to the north of the chancel, and a west tower. The tower is entirely octagonal, from the bottom to the top, and is the only tower of this type in Shropshire. (Note: The tower has features similar to those found in the towers of Caernarvon Castle, and it is suggested that they were designed by the same mason.) The tower is in three stages, with shallow buttresses on the angles, slit windows in the lower stages, two-light bell openings in Decorated style, and a battlemented parapet. On the northeast and southeast sides of the tower are clock faces. The nave, aisle, and north chapel each have separate roofs, resulting in an east end of three gables, an unusual arrangement in the county. Along the south side of the church are two windows above which are blocked Norman-style arches. The east window, dating from 1846 to 1847, has five lights and is in Decorated style.

=== Interior ===
Between the nave and the aisle is a five-bay arcade carried on alternate circular and octagonal piers with chamfered bases and capitals. In the south wall of the aisle is a piscina (or an aumbry). The font has both Norman features and features from a later date, possibly the 17th century. It is thought that it originated in the 12th century and was embellished later. Flanking the east window are boards inscribed with the Ten Commandments, each with Ionic pilasters, under round arches. The hexagonal wooden pulpit stands on a stone base, and dates probably from the 18th century. Also in the church is a pair of 17th-century parish chests, and a poor box. The east window of the chancel contains stained glass by William Warrington dated 1849. In the east window of the south chapel is glass by David Evans depicting the Four Evangelists dating from about 1846. Elsewhere in the chapel is a window of 1853 by William Wailes, and in the north chapel is a window of 1906 by Powell's. The oldest monument dates from 1697, and there are more monuments from the 18th and 19th centuries. One of these is to Reginald Heber, at one time rector of the church, a hymn writer, and later the Bishop of Calcutta, who died in 1826; it is by Chantrey with an inscription by Robert Southey, and is dated 1829. Another is the recumbent effigy of Blanche Heber (died 1870), which was sculpted by her cousin, Reginald Cholmondeley. Within the west end are two memorial Rolls of Honour from World War I listing men from the parishes of Hodnet, Stoke upon Tern and Stanton upon Hine Heath who died serving in the war.

The two-manual pipe organ dating from 1878 is by Nicholson and Lord. There is a ring of eight bells. Six of these were cast in 1769 by Thomas Rudhall, and two by Taylor's of Loughborough in 1947.

== External features ==
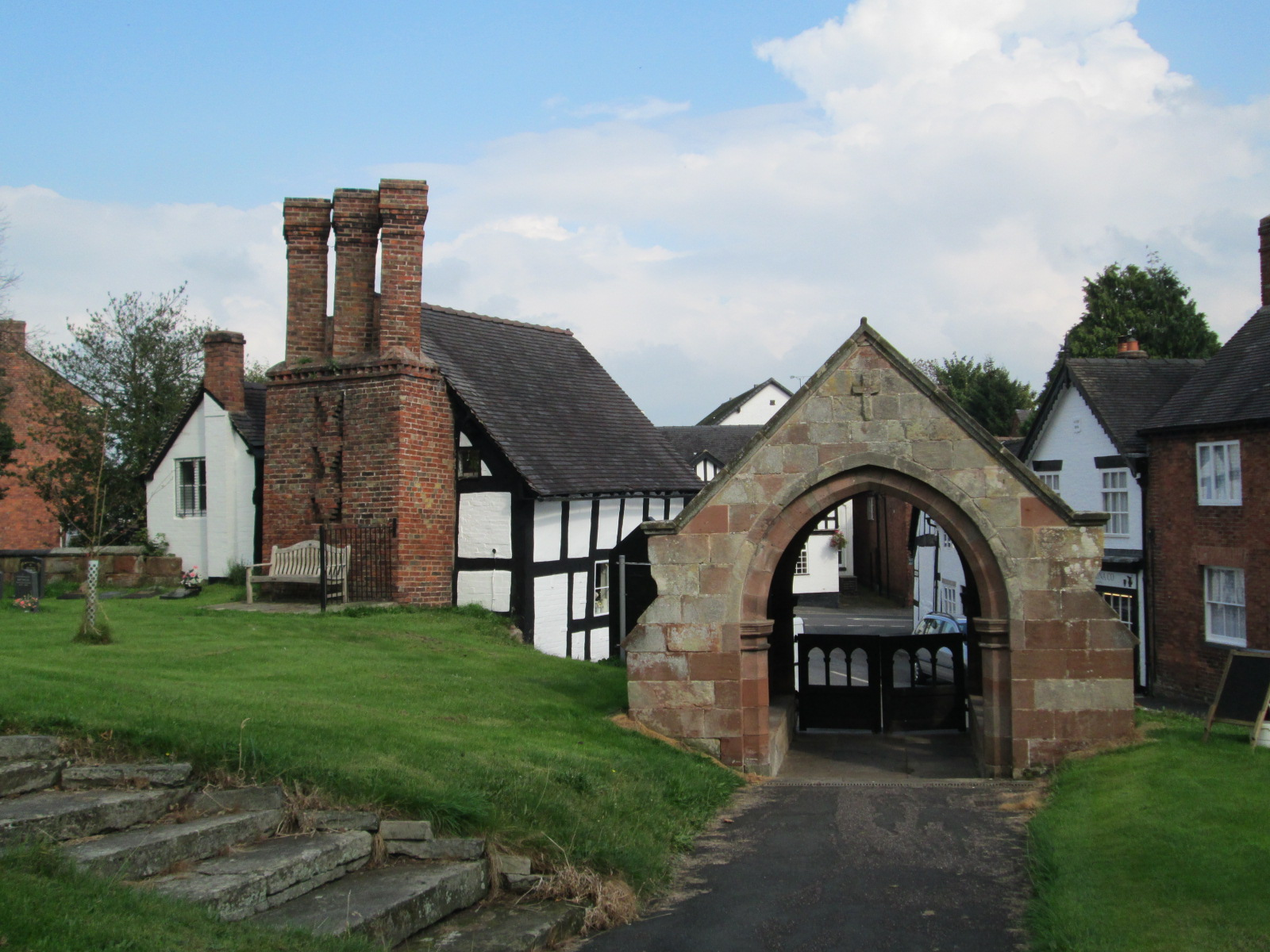
The lychgate of St Luke's, viewed from the churchyard

At the entrance to the churchyard is a lychgate dating from about 1870. It is constructed in sandstone, has a tile roof, and is in Decorated style. It is approached by six steps from the east, and at the eastern entrance is a pair of wooden gates. Inside the lychgate are stone benches. It is listed at Grade II. Outside the east end of the church is the granite parish war memorial cross which lists local dead from both world wars and one from the Palestine campaign of 1948. It stands in a large area paved with old gravestones moved from elsewhere in the churchyard.

== Recent history ==
In 2006 the church was damaged by people apparently seeking clues towards the discovery of the Holy Grail, the subject of the book The Da Vinci Code by Dan Brown. The damage was caused to stonework beneath the stained glass window depicting the Four Evangelists, which shows Saint John with an apparently feminine appearance.

== See also ==
- Grade I listed churches in Shropshire
- Listed buildings in Hodnet, Shropshire
