= Listed buildings in Hodnet =

Hodnet is a civil parish in Shropshire, England. It contains 59 listed buildings that are recorded in the National Heritage List for England. Of these, two are listed at Grade I, the highest of the three grades, five are at Grade II*, the middle grade, and the others are at Grade II, the lowest grade. The parish contains the villages of Hodnet, Peplow, and Wollerton, and smaller settlements, and is otherwise mainly rural. The oldest building in the parish is the 12th-century St Luke's Church, which is listed, together with its lychgate. In the parish are two country houses that are listed, with associated structures. Most of the other listed buildings are houses, cottages, farmhouses and farm buildings, many of which are timber framed and date from the 15th to the 18th centuries. Also listed are an animal pound, three mileposts, another church, and a telephone kiosk.

== Key ==
Grade	Criteria
I	Buildings of exceptional interest, sometimes considered to be internationally important
II*	Particularly important buildings of more than special interest
II	Buildings of national importance and special interest

== Buildings ==
Name and location	Photograph	Date	Notes	Grade
St Luke's Church; 52.85349°N 2.57693°W		12th century	The oldest part of the church is the south aisle, which originated as a nave. In the early 14th century a wide aisle was added to the north with an east chapel, which later became the nave and the chancel; the west tower was added at the same time. A family burial chapel was added to the north in 1870; this chapel, the chancel and the south aisle each has an east gable. The church is built in red and yellow sandstone and has tiled roofs. The tower has an octagonal plan for its whole height, it has three stages, a stepped buttress on each angle, two clock faces, an embattled parapet with gargoyles, and a weathervane. The east window has five lights, and is in Decorated style.	I
19, 20 and 21 Drayton Road; 52.86197°N 2.57521°W	—	Mid 15th century	The house was extended and altered in the 19th century, and has been divided into two dwellings. The original part is timber framed with cruck construction and brick infill on a sandstone plinth, the extension is in brick, painted to resemble timber framing, and the roof is tiled. The original part consists of a two-storey gabled hall range at right angles to the road, and a cross-wing to the right with one storey and an attic, and two bays. The bargeboards in the hall range are shaped, the windows are casements, and there are three gabled half-dormers.	II
School House; 52.86197°N 2.60669°W	—	Mid to late 15th century	The house was altered and extended in about 1600, and in the 18th and 19th centuries. The original parts are timber framed with cruck construction, extended in brick, on a sandstone plinth, and with quoins and a tile roof. There is one storey and an attic. Originally a hall house of two or three bays, there are extensions at both ends, at the right end a school room at right angles. On the front is a gabled porch, the windows are casements, there are two gabled dormers on the front with shaped bargeboards, and a dormer at the rear with a chamfered bressumer. Inside are two full cruck trusses.	II
The Cottage; 52.85413°N 2.57649°W	—	Mid 16th century	The house was extended in the 17th century. It is timber framed with brick infill on a sandstone plinth and has a tile roof. There is one storey, attics and a basement, the original part is a two-bay hall range, with a later projecting gabled cross-wing to the right, a two-storey porch in the angle, and a rear lean-to. The upper floor and gable of the porch are jettied with moulded bressumers on shaped brackets. The windows are casements, and there is a raking half-dormer.	II
Whitehaven; 52.86102°N 2.60212°W	—	1569	The house was extended in the 17th and 19th centuries. It is timber framed with brick infill on a brick plinth, the left gable end has been rebuilt in brick, and the roof is slated. There is one storey and an attic, and a T-shaped plan, with a front range of three bays and a later one-bay rear extension. The windows are casements, and there are a gabled half-dormer.	II
1 Shrewsbury Street; 52.85350°N 2.57568°W	—	1585	A timber framed cottage with brick infill, partly rebuilt in brick, and with a tile roof. There is one storey and attic, and two bays. On the front is a gabled porch, to the right is a blocked doorway with a shaped and inscribed head, the windows are casements, and there are two gabled eaves dormers.	II
Pound Cottage; 52.86357°N 2.56001°W	—	c. 1600	The house, which was altered in the 17th and 19th centuries, is timber framed with infill in wattle and daub and in brick, the right gable wall has been rebuilt in brick, and the roof is tiled. There is one storey with an attic, two bays, and a rear lean-to. The windows are casements, and there is a large full gabled dormer containing a pair of windows. The left gable end has a jettied upper floor with a moulded bressumer.	II
15 Drayton Road; 52.85542°N 2.57377°W	—	Late 16th to early 17th century	The house was altered in the 19th or 20th century. It is timber framed with brick infill on a chamfered sandstone plinth, and has a tile roof. There is one storey and an attic, and three bays. The windows are casements, and there is a small staircase window and three gabled half-dormers.	II
Tithe barn, Home Farm; 52.84969°N 2.57952°W		1619	The tithe barn is timber framed on a red sandstone plinth, Behind the upper rows of panels is weatherboarding, and the lower panels have brick infill. The roof is tiled, there are five bays, two doorways, and three loft doors.	II*
22 Drayton Road; 52.85404°N 2.57554°W	—	Early 17th century	A timber framed cottage with brick infill on a sandstone plinth, the left gable end rendered, the right gable end partly rebuilt and extended in brick, and the roof is tiled. There is one storey and an attic, three bays, and a later gabled rear wing. On the front is a gabled porch, the windows are casements, and there are three gabled eaves dormers.	II
22 Marchamley; 52.86178°N 2.60065°W		Early 17th century	A timber framed house with brick infill on a rendered plinth, with a thatched roof. It has one storey and an attic, two bays, a rear wing, and an extension to the left. The windows are casements, and there are two gabled eaves dormers.	II
The Old Hall; 52.86248°N 2.55940°W		Early 17th century	A timber framed house with brick infill and a tile roof. There are two storeys and a T-shaped plan. On the front is a gabled porch and a doorway with a four-light fanlight. The gables have shaped bargeboards and finials, and the upper floors and gables are jettied with bressumers. Some windows are casements and others are sashes.	II*
Gateway and walls, Hodnet Park; 52.84989°N 2.57791°W	—	1631	The gateway is in yellow and grey sandstone. On the north side the archway is flanked by buttresses, and above the arch is rustication returned as voussoirs, a keystone with Ionic volutes and an inscription, a panelled frieze, and an open triangular pediment with a globe finial in the tympanum. It contains a pair of decorative wrought iron gates. The flanking walls have ramped chamfered copings and square end piers with moulded caps and globe finials.	II
7 Church Street; 52.85354°N 2.57604°W	—	Mid 17th century	The cottage was altered in the 19th and 20th centuries. It is timber framed with brick infill on a plinth of brick and sandstone, the front gable has been rebuilt in brick, and the roof is tiled. There is one storey, an attic and a basement, and two gabled bays on the front, the left bay wider and taller. The gables have shaped bargeboards, and the left gable has a finial. Steps lead up to a gabled porch and a doorway with a segmental head. The windows are casements, and most have segmental heads.	II
8 Drayton Road; 52.85511°N 2.57444°W	—	Mid 17th century	The cottage was altered and extended in the 19th and 20th centuries. The original part is timber framed with brick infill, the left gable end has been rebuilt in brick the rear extension is in brick, and the roof is tiled. There is one storey and an attic, two bays, and a rear 20th-century lean-to. The windows are casements, and there are two gabled eaves dormers.	II
1 and 2 Wollerton; 52.86259°N 2.55965°W	—	Mid 17th century	A pair of timber framed houses with brick infill on a brick plinth with a tile roof. There are two storeys, three bays, a one-storey brick lean-to on the left, and the windows are casements.	II
Bench Mark Cottage; 52.86421°N 2.60147°W	—	Mid 17th century	The house, which was altered in the 20th century, is timber framed with brick infill, the left gable end has been rebuilt in brick and rendered, and the roof is partly tiled and partly slated. There are two storeys and two bays. On the front is a gabled porch, the windows are windows, and the upper floor of the right gable end is jettied.	II
Barn, New House Farm; 52.86697°N 2.57794°W	—	Mid 17th century	The barn was altered in the 19th century. It is timber framed with brick infill and matchboarding on a brick plinth, the end walls are rebuilt in red brick, and it has a tile roof. The barn contains various windows and doorways.	II
Slip Farmhouse; 52.86598°N 2.60496°W	—	Mid 17th century	A farmhouse, later a private house, it is timber framed with plaster infill and a tile roof. There is one storey and an attic, and three bays. The windows are casements, and there are two gabled dormers.	II
Vale Farmhouse; 52.87916°N 2.61402°W	—	Mid 17th century	The farmhouse was extended in the 18th and 19th centuries. It is timber framed with brick infill on a brick plinth, partly rebuilt and extended in brick, and has a slate roof with a parapeted gable. There are two storeys and a T-shaped plan, with a two-bay range, a two-bay projecting gabled cross-wing, and a later extension to the rear of the cross-wing. There is a brick porch in the angle, some windows are casements, and others are sashes.	II
Ye Hundred House; 52.85363°N 2.57592°W	—	Mid 17th century	A timber framed house with brick infill on a red sandstone plinth with a tile roof. There is one storey and an attic, and three bays. On the front is a gabled porch, the windows are casements, and there are three gabled eaves dormers.	II
Dovecote; 52.84972°N 2.58158°W		1656	The dovecote in the grounds of Hodnet Hall is in red brick on a plinth, with grey sandstone dressings, quoins, a string course, a band of lozenge-shaped panels, and a pyramidal tiled roof with parapeted and coped gables and a finial. It has a rectangular plan, one storey and a loft, and in each gable end is a two-light mullioned window. The north front contains a doorway above which are three arched panels with impost blocks and keystones, one containing an inscription, and in the south front is a segmental-headed doorway.	II*
The Old Manor House; 52.86175°N 2.60565°W	—	1656	The house was restored in the 19th century; it is timber framed with plaster infill and a slate roof. There is one storey and an attic, and three bays. The gable ends are jettied with moulded bressumers. The windows are mullioned and transomed, they contain diamond leaded lights, and have gabled tops. There are two large dormers that have jettied gables, chamfered bressumers, and shaped brackets.	II
Hodnet Cottage; 52.85503°N 2.57422°W		Mid to late 17th century	The cottage is timber framed with brick infill on a rendered plinth, and has a thatched roof. There are two storeys and an attic, and two bays, and the windows are casements.	II
24 and 25 Shrewsbury Road; 52.85173°N 2.57349°W	—	Late 17th century	A house and a barn, later two houses, they are timber framed with brick infill, and have roofs partly tiled and partly slated. Each house has two bays, the left house has two storeys, the right house has one storey and an attic, and there are lean-to additions at the rear. The windows are casements, and in the right house are two gabled eaves dormers.	II
Hillhampton Cottage and Ivy House; 52.86128°N 2.60282°W	—	Late 17th century	A pair of cottages that were later altered and extended. They are timber framed with brick infill, extensions in brick, and a tile roof. There is one storey and an attic, and on the front are two wooden ornamental gabled porches with lattice sides. The windows are casements, and there are three gabled eaves dormers.	II
Lostford Hall; 52.88443°N 2.55593°W	—	Late 17th century	The farmhouse probably has an earlier core, and was altered in the 18th and 20th centuries. It is in red brick on a plinth, with grey sandstone dressings, quoins, a string course, a dentil eaves cornice, and a tile roof with parapeted and coped gables. There are two storeys and a basement, a front of two bays, and a two-storey kitchen wing to the northwest. The doorway has a moulded architrave and a radial fanlight, and in the ground floor are French windows.	II
Hawkstone Hall; 52.86505°N 2.62337°W		1690s	A country house that was later altered and extended, with a chapel was added in 1925. The house is in red brick with sandstone dressings and hipped slate roofs. It consists of a central block of nine bays, with two storeys, attics and basement, corner towers, three-bay quadrant link walls, and five-bay two-storey wings. In the centre is a tetrastyle Corinthian portico with fluted three-quarter columns, an entablature with a modillion cornice, a triangular pediment with urn finials, and a coat of arms in the tympanum. Seven steps flanked by sphinxes lead up to the doorway that has a moulded architrave, a triple keystone with a monogram, and an open and broken pediment.	I
Peplow Hall; 52.81801°N 2.53769°W		1725	A country house that was extended in 1887, and reduced in size in the 1930s. It is built in red brick with parapets. The house has two storeys, and fronts of seven and six bays. The west front has corner pilaster strips, a band and a moulded cornice. The parapet is panelled with stone coping, it is raised in the middle three bays, and contains a sundial with a broken triangular pediment. The central doorway has a moulded architrave, panelled pilaster strips, and a shell hood on shaped brackets, and the windows are sashes.	II*
Gates, gate piers and flanking walls, Peplow Hall; 52.81737°N 2.53992°W		c. 1725	The square gate piers flanking the entrance to the drive are in grey sandstone with red brick panels. Each pier has a moulded plinth, a frieze, a moulded cornice, and a large urn finial with a crest. Between them are decorative wrought iron carriage gates flanked by pedestrian gates. Outside the piers are brick quadrant walls with chamfered coping and square end piers with pyramidal caps.	II
Walls and barn, Peplow Hall; 52.81913°N 2.53716°W	—	c. 1725	The walls are in red brick with sandstone coping and they enclose the kitchen garden of the hall. A section of wall incorporating a greenhouse, and a gateway, both have a pair of brick piers with stone globe finials. Also incorporated in the wall is a former barn in red brick with a tile roof, a blocked Gothic window, and a blocked cart entrance.	II
Rotunda; 52.86478°N 2.62081°W	—	Early 18th century	The rotunda is in the drive to the east of Hawkstone Hall. It is in grey sandstone with an octagonal plan. It has a base with a moulded plinth, square Tuscan piers, an entablature, a blocking course, and a high ribbed dome. On the east and west sides are five steps with side walls and end piers surmounted by cast iron urns.	II
Wollerton Farmhouse; 52.86226°N 2.55946°W	—	Early 18th century	A farmhouse, later altered and extended and converted into two houses. It is in red brick with a tile roof, and has two storeys and attics, four bays, a later rear extension with two storeys, and a single-storey lean-to. There is a gabled porch, most of the windows are cross-windows, and there is a gabled dormer. In the left gable end is a sash window, and above is a single attic window.	II
North Barn, Wollerton Farm; 52.86233°N 2.55886°W	—	Early 18th century	The barn, which was altered in the 19th century, is timber framed on a brick plinth, with weatherboarding and cladding in corrugated iron, and a tile roof. The gable ends have been rebuilt in brick, and there are three bays. The barn contains various doorways and windows, and on the north gable end is a lean-to.	II
Abbey Farmhouse; 52.87307°N 2.63138°W	—	Mid 18th century	The farmhouse was extended in the 19th century. It is in red brick on a plinth with sill bands, a cornice string course, and a three-span tile roof. The south front has three storeys, three bays, and flanking recessed three-bay single-storey wings. The bays are divided by piers with moulded caps. The central bay has an embattled parapet, and the outer bays have embattled gables. The central doorway has a fanlight, and the windows are casements with impost blocks and hood moulds. Each wing has a dentil eaves cornice and a parapeted gable end, and at the rear are three parapeted gables.	II*
New House Farmhouse; 52.86663°N 2.57787°W	—	Mid 18th century	The farmhouse was extended in the 19th and 20th centuries, and is in red brick with a tile roof. There are two storeys and an attic, three bays, a two-storey rear wing, and a two-storey left extension. The central doorway has a segmental head. In the ground floor the windows are mullioned and transomed, in the upper floor they are cross-windows, and there are two hipped dormers.	II
Farm buildings, Hawkstone Park Farm; 52.86696°N 2.62135°W	—	Mid to late 18th century	Part of a former stable block, later used for other purposes, it is in red brick on a stone plinth with a moulded eaves cornice and a hipped slate roof. There are two storeys, and the buildings consist of an eight-bay range, a pavilion at the left with a pyramidal roof, and a one-storey rear wing. The main range contains doorways with fanlights and sash windows, and the rear wing is a cart shed with seven arches, three of which are blocked.	II
Beech House; 52.86509°N 2.55942°W	—	Late 18th century	The house is in red brick with flanking pilaster strips, a band, a dentil eaves cornice, and a tile roof. There are three storeys, five bays, and two later rear wings. The central doorway has a moulded architrave, a three-light fanlight, and a triangular-pedimented hood on shaped brackets. The windows are sash windows with rusticated lintels, and there are three gabled eaves dormers.	II
North Lodge, gates and gate piers 52.87625°N 2.61875°W	—	Late 18th century	A pair of lodges at the former entrance to Hawkstone Hall, they are in grey sandstone. Each lodge is square with two storeys, and has a plinth, corner piers, a moulded cornice and a parapet with moulded coping. On the north and south sides are round-arched recesses with a sash window on the south and casement windows elsewhere. Between them is a wooden carriage gate flanked by pedestrian gates. They have square gate piers, with half-piers attached to the lodges, each with a moulded plinth, a fluted frieze, and a pyramidal cap.	II
Pound; 52.86364°N 2.56112°W		Late 18th century	The animal pound stands at a road junction and is in red brick with stone coping. It has a horseshoe-shaped plan, pilaster buttresses, and a wooden gate to the north.	II
Vineyard walls and steps 52.85948°N 2.61857°W	—	Late 18th century	The former vineyard is in Hawkstone Park. The retaining walls are in sandstone and are on a rock-cut terrace about 60 metres (200 ft) long. There are adjoining flights of rock-cut steps.	II
Vineyard walls and tower 52.85949°N 2.62056°W	—	Late 18th century	The former vineyard is in Hawkstone Park. The retaining walls and tower are in sandstone and are on a rock-cut terrace about 270 metres (890 ft) long. The tower is in the centre, it is circular, in Gothick style, and has a high plinth and cruciform loop openings.	II
The Hearne Farmhouse; 52.85772°N 2.57645°W	—	c. 1800	The farmhouse is in red brick on a plinth, with a dentil eaves cornice, and a hipped slate roof. It has three storeys, three bays, and a two-storey rear wing. The central doorway has a moulded architrave, an impost band, a radial fanlight, and a moulded flat hood with shaped brackets and reeded ends. The windows are casements, those in the lower two floors having segmental heads.	II
The Old Rectory; 52.85689°N 2.58146°W	—	1812	The house, designed by Edward Haycock in Tudor Gothic style, is in red brick on a chamfered stone plinth, with red sandstone dressings, a moulded eaves cornice, and a tile roof with parapeted and coped gables, and obelisk finials. There are two storeys and an attic, a front of five bays, and a three-bay rear wing. On the front is a sandstone porch with a chamfered plinth, diagonal buttresses, a moulded cornice, an embattled parapet, and a Tudor arched entrance. Most of the windows are cross-windows, and in the left return is a canted bay window.	II
Lostford House Farmhouse; 52.87773°N 2.55900°W	—	c. 1824	The farmhouse is in red brick on a stone plinth, with an eaves band, a dentil eaves cornice, and a tile roof. There are three storeys, three bays, the middle bay projecting, and a two-storey rear wing. In the centre is a Tuscan porch with an entablature, and a doorway that has decorated pilasters with reeded caps, an impost band, and a radial fanlight. The windows are sashes, the window above the doorway in a round-headed recess.	II
1 Drayton Road; 52.85390°N 2.57631°W	—	Early 19th century	A house and a shop in red brick with a dentil eaves cornice and a tile roof with parapeted and coped gables. There are three storeys and four bays. In the ground floor is a 19th-century shop front in the first two bays. The third bay contains a doorway with a moulded architrave, pilaster strips, and a fluted frieze. In the fourth bay is a tripartite sash window with pilaster strips, a frieze and a dentil cornice. In the upper floor are sash windows.	II
2 Drayton Road; 52.85412°N 2.57572°W	—	Early 19th century	A red brick house with a tile roof, three storeys, three bays, and later rear extensions. The central doorway has an architrave, a radial fanlight, and a gabled hood on brackets, and the windows are sashes with slightly segmental heads.	II
Bradley Farmhouse; 52.87852°N 2.56456°W	—	Early 19th century	The farmhouse is in red brick with a slate roof, and it has an L-shaped plan. The main range has three storeys and three bays, and the rear wing has two storeys and a dentil eaves cornice. The central doorcase has unfluted Doric three-quarter columns, a frieze and a triangular pediment, and the doorway has panelled pilaster strips, an impost band and a radial fanlight. The windows are sashes, the middle window in the first floor in an arched recess.	II
Ranger's Lodge; 52.86359°N 2.61415°W	—	Early 19th century	The house was remodelled and extended in about 1928. It is pebbledashed on a plinth, with an impost band, a moulded stone eaves cornice, and a hipped slate roof. The main block has two storeys and a square plan with sides of three bays, and to the east is a later single-storey extension. On the front, the middle bay projects forward and has a triangular pediment. There is a central doorway that has a moulded architrave with fluted pilasters, a cast iron fanlight, and a round-arched hood. In each bay are round-headed full-height recesses, and the windows are sashes.	II
Former conservatory 52.86511°N 2.62232°W	—	1832–34	The conservatory at the rear of Hawkstone Hall was designed by Lewis Wyatt, and has since been altered and used for other purposes. It is in grey sandstone, the glazing has been replaced by rendered panels, and it has a hipped slate roof. There are sides of seven and five bays, pilasters, a frieze, and a moulded cornice. The windows have segmental heads, and on the roof is a cowl.	II
Rake Park Lodge; 52.85591°N 2.62174°W		c. 1840	The former entrance lodge is in sandstone with a tile roof, and is in Tudor Gothic style. It has diagonal buttresses, a cornice, and parapeted gable ends with chamfered copings and moulded kneelers. There is one storey and an attic, and a lower short range at the rear. In the gable end facing the road is a mullioned window, and below is a projecting porch. On the sides are canted bay windows on stone brackets.	II
Milepost near Lodgebank; 52.82930°N 2.59982°W	—	Mid 19th century	The milepost is on the east side of the A53 road. It is in cast iron and has a triangular section and a chamfered top. The milepost is inscribed with the distances in miles to "SALOP" (Shrewsbury) and to "DRAYTON" (Market Drayton).	II
Milepost near Stone House; 52.86310°N 2.56577°W	—	Mid 19th century	The milepost is on the east side of Drayton road. It is in cast iron and has a triangular section and a chamfered top. The milepost is inscribed with the distances in miles to "SALOP" (Shrewsbury) and to "DRAYTON" (Market Drayton).	II
Milepost near Lostford House Farmhouse; 52.87648°N 2.55809°W	—	Mid 19th century	The milepost is on the east side of the road. It is in cast iron and has a triangular section and a chamfered top. The milepost is inscribed with the distances in miles to "SALOP" (Shrewsbury) and to "DRAYTON" (Market Drayton).	II
Paradise Lodge; 52.85435°N 2.58884°W	—	1853–54	The lodge is in red brick on a plinth, with grey sandstone dressings, and a tile roof with decorative valences, pendants, and bargeboards, and ridge cresting. It is in Tudor Revival style, and has one storey and an attic, and front of three bays. Across the front is a full-width open porch on octagonal piers, with a central gable, and hipped roofs to the sides. On the returns are square bay windows with mullioned windows and embattled parapets.	II
Lychgate; 52.85346°N 2.57612°W		c. 1870	The lychgate is at the entrance to the churchyard of St Luke's Church. It is in sandstone with a tile roof, and is in Decorated style. At each entrance is a recessed chamfered arch flanked by half-octagonal piers with moulded capitals, and there are similar openings on the sides. The steps leading up from the street have side walls with coping and square end piers, and at the east entrance are wooden gates. Inside are stone benches.	II
Chapel of the Epiphany; 52.81910°N 2.54020°W		1877–79	The chapel, designed by Norman Shaw in free Perpendicular style, is in red brick with dressings in red sandstone, some of the upper parts are timber framed with red brick infill, the west gable end is tile-hung, and the roof is tiled. The chapel consists of a nave and a chancel in one cell, a gabled northwest porch, a lean-to north vestry and a lean-to south chapel. At the junction of the nave and the chancel is a timber framed bellcote with a finial and a weathervane.	II
Gateway and walls, Hodnet Hall; 52.85326°N 2.57719°W		1887	The gateway is in grey sandstone, and in Neo-Jacobean style. On the east side the archway is flanked by buttresses, and above the arch is rustication returned as voussoirs, a keystone with Ionic volutes and an inscription, a panelled frieze, and an open triangular pediment with a globe finial in the tympanum. The flanking walls have ramped chamfered copings and square end piers with moulded caps and globe finials.	II
Sundial; 52.86508°N 2.62379°W	—	c. 1900	The sundial is in the courtyard at the front of Hawkstone Hall. It is in grey sandstone, and has a square base with three steps, and lions carved on each corner. The octagonal tapering shaft has a capital with carved crowns, and on the top is an inscribed re-used copper plate and a gnomon.	II.
Telephone kiosk 52.85394°N 2.57631°W	—	1935	A K6 type telephone kiosk, designed by Giles Gilbert Scott. Constructed in cast iron with a square plan and a dome, it has three unperforated crowns in the top panels.	II
