= Russell Lloyd (film editor) =

British film editor (1916–2008)

- Born: Hugh Russell Lloyd; 16 January 1916; Swansea, Wales
- Died: 21 January 2008 (aged 92); Cranleigh, England
- Occupation: Film editor
- Years active: 1937–1986
- Spouse(s): Rosamund John (m. 1943; div. 1949) Valerie Cox (m. 1950)

Russell Lloyd (16 January 1916 – 21 January 2008) was a British film editor who amassed fifty credits on feature films. Lloyd had a notable collaboration with the director John Huston that extended over eleven films. Lloyd was nominated for an Academy Award for Best Film Editing for Huston's The Man Who Would Be King (1975).

Lloyd's first film with Huston was Moby Dick (1956); Huston was so satisfied with Lloyd's initiative and editing that he subsequently entrusted post-production of the films he directed entirely to Lloyd. Tony Sloman has written, "Lloyd's remarkable relationship with Huston reached its apogee with The Man Who Would Be King (1975) in which the editor's and director's styles meshed seamlessly, for both were opposed to the then (and still) current trend for overcutting action sequences, and there is a tremendous moment of pure cinema when Sean Connery falls to his doom from a collapsing rope bridge in a single shot."

Lloyd had been elected to membership in the American Cinema Editors.

== Selected filmography ==
- Whirlpool (1959)

== See also ==
- List of film director and editor collaborations
