= Lou Dalton =

English menswear fashion designer

Lou Dalton is an English menswear fashion designer based in London. She has launched her own brand and collaborated with other fashion lines.

== Early life ==
Dalton was born in Shropshire and grew up on her grandmother's farm in the hills of Hodnet She left school at age 16 taking up a Youth Training Scheme (YTS) apprenticeship to a tailor making shooting garments. She studied for a BTEC National Diploma in Textiles at Stafford Art College, followed by an HND in Design & Fabrication at Berkshire Higher Education College, before being accepted to study menswear at the Royal College of Art. She worked at Bespoke Tailor Charlie Allen as a design assistant while studying for a Master's degree in Fashion Menswear at the Royal College of Art, graduating in 1998. Her final year show drew upon her working class roots growing up in rural Shropshire.

== Career ==
After graduation, she worked as an assistant to designer, Hamish Morrow, where she was mentored by designer and TED fellow, Suzanne Lee. She was then headhunted to work in Bologna, Italy for design studio Alessandro Pungetti, working on collections for Stone Island, Zegna & Cruciani knitwear as a research and design assistant, before moving on to design roles at Red or Dead, Tommy Hilfiger, Full Circle, Stone Island, Iceberg and Japanese brand United Arrows. Following mentoring from fashion journalists Sarah Mower and Tim Blanks, she launched her eponymous brand in 2008. She is currently a Senior Menswear Designer at Cos Menswear whilst continuing her knitwear design collaboration with John Smedley

== Collaborations ==
In 2015, Dalton created a short fashion film with Italian label Cerruti. Directed by Nick Leary, the black-and-white film was shot at the Lanificio Cerruti textile mill in Biella, Italy, and at Dalton’s studio in London. It depicts Nino Cerruti's work with wool, and illustrates the bonds between Nino Cerruti, the mill and Dalton.

In January 2016 she collaborated with Jaeger on a men‘s collection for autumn 2016. The collection was shown during the London Fashion Week: Men's shows and was inspired by items from Jaeger’s archives, including some that Ernest Shackleton wore for his famous 1914 Endurance Expedition to Antarctica. The partnership continued for a second spring 2017 collection in June 2016.

She collaborated with British high street retailer River Island on a 13-piece menswear collection in 2016.

In January 2016, Dalton collaborated with British knitwear brand John Smegley on a collection for fall 2016 that included a sweater featuring a topographical map that was promoted by Dalton's friend and actor Russell Tovey. The collaboration continues
