= Reginald Heber =

English clergyman and man of letters

The Most Reverend Reginald Heber
- Bishop of Calcutta
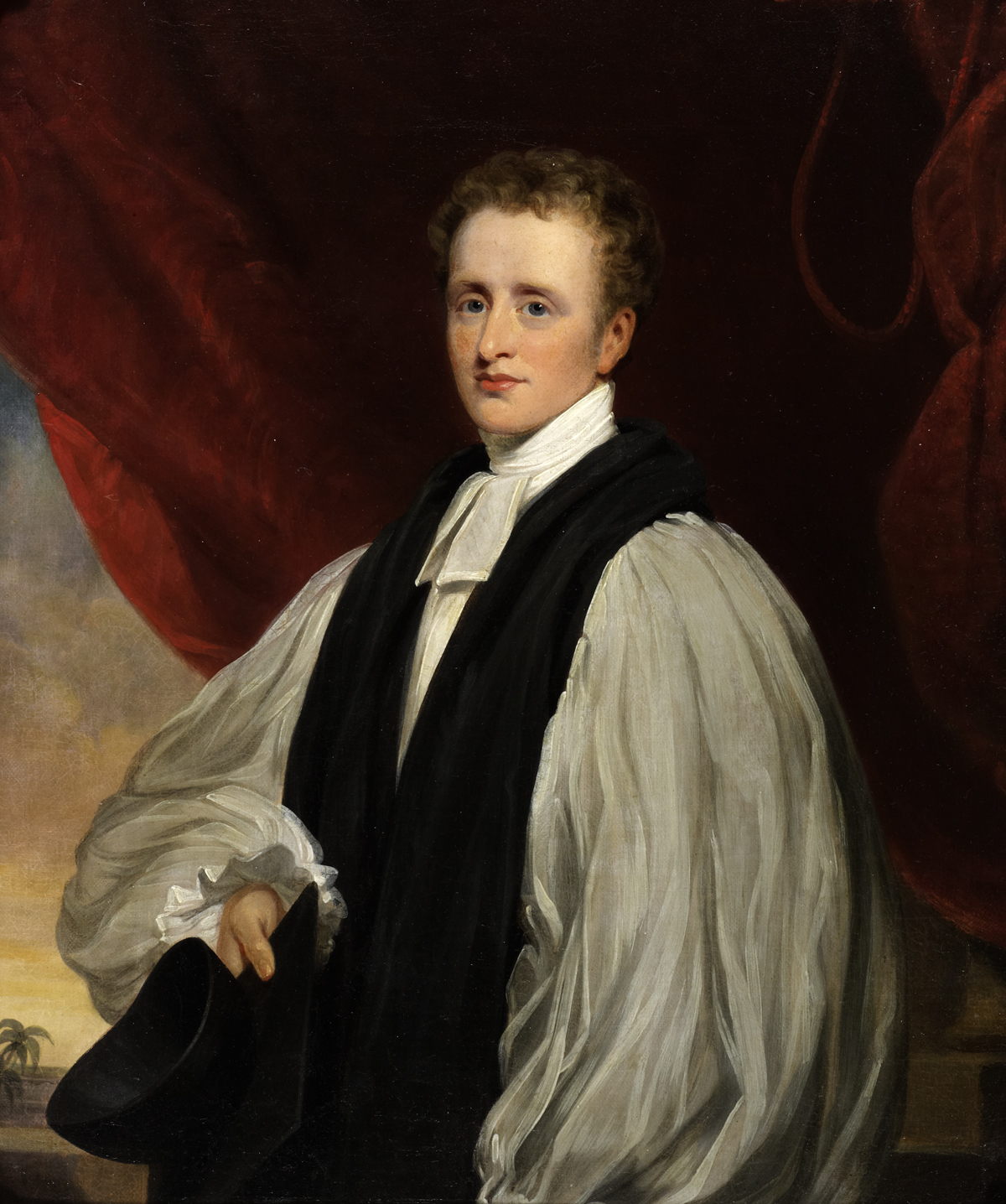
- Church: Church of England
- Diocese: Calcutta

Orders
- Ordination: 1807 (deacon); 1807 (priest)
- Consecration: 1 June 1823 (bishop)

Personal details
- Born: 21 April 1783 Malpas, Cheshire, England
- Died: 3 April 1826 (aged 42) Trichinopoly, Madras Presidency, British India (now Tiruchirappalli, Tamil Nadu, India)
- Denomination: Anglican
- Spouse: Amelia Shipley (m. 1809, died)
- Children: 3 daughters
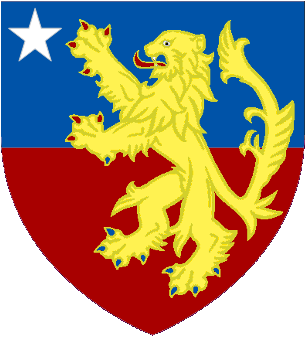
- Coat of arms

Reginald Heber (21 April 1783 – 3 April 1826) was an English Anglican bishop, a man of letters, and hymn-writer. After 16 years as a country parson, he served as Bishop of Calcutta until his death at the age of 42. The son of a rich landowner and cleric, Heber gained fame at the University of Oxford as a poet. After graduation he made an extended tour of Scandinavia, Russia and Central Europe. Ordained in 1807, he took over his father's old parish, Hodnet, Shropshire. He also wrote hymns and general literature, including a study of the works of the 17th-century cleric Jeremy Taylor.

He was consecrated Bishop of Calcutta in October 1823. He travelled widely and worked to improve the spiritual and general living conditions of his flock. Arduous duties, a hostile climate and poor health led to his collapse and death after less than three years in India. Memorials were erected there and in St Paul's Cathedral, London. A collection of his hymns appeared soon after his death. "Holy, Holy, Holy! Lord God Almighty" remains popular for Trinity Sunday, while "Brightest and Best" is frequently sung during Epiphany.

== Early life ==
=== Background and childhood ===
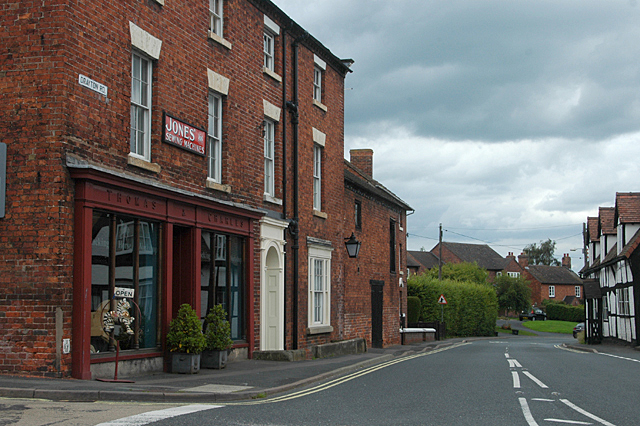
Hodnet in Shropshire, where Heber spent his early years

The surname "Heber" probably derives from "Haybergh", a hill in the Craven district of Yorkshire, where the family originated. The Hebers held the lordship of the manor of Marton, and were granted a coat of arms during the reign of Queen Elizabeth I. Richard Heber was the son of Thomas Heber and Elizabeth Atherton, the granddaughter of Richard Atherton.

In 1752 Richard Heber received the manor and estate of Hodnet Hall in Shropshire as a bequest from a cousin of his wife. This included patronage of the parish of Hodnet. On Richard Heber's death in 1766 his brother Reginald, who was co-rector of the parish of Malpas in Cheshire, inherited the Shropshire estate and additionally became rector of Hodnet. His first marriage, to Mary Baylie, produced a son, Richard Heber, who became a noted book collector and Member of Parliament for Oxford University. His second marriage to Mary Allanson, after Mary Baylie's death, produced two further sons, the elder, born at Malpas on 21 April 1783, being named Reginald after his father.

At the age of eight the younger Reginald began five years at the local grammar school at Whitchurch. In 1796 he was sent to Bristow's, a small private school in Neasden a few miles north of Central London. This provided intensive learning for around a dozen boys, preparing them for eventual entry to Oxford or Cambridge. At Bristow's he met John Thornton, who became a lifelong friend, sharing an interest in church history and beliefs; a lengthy letter from Heber to Thornton is described by Heber's biographer Arthur Montefiore as worthy of a learned theologian. In October 1800 Heber entered Brasenose College, Oxford; Thornton's decision to go to Cambridge was a matter for Heber's regret.

=== Oxford ===
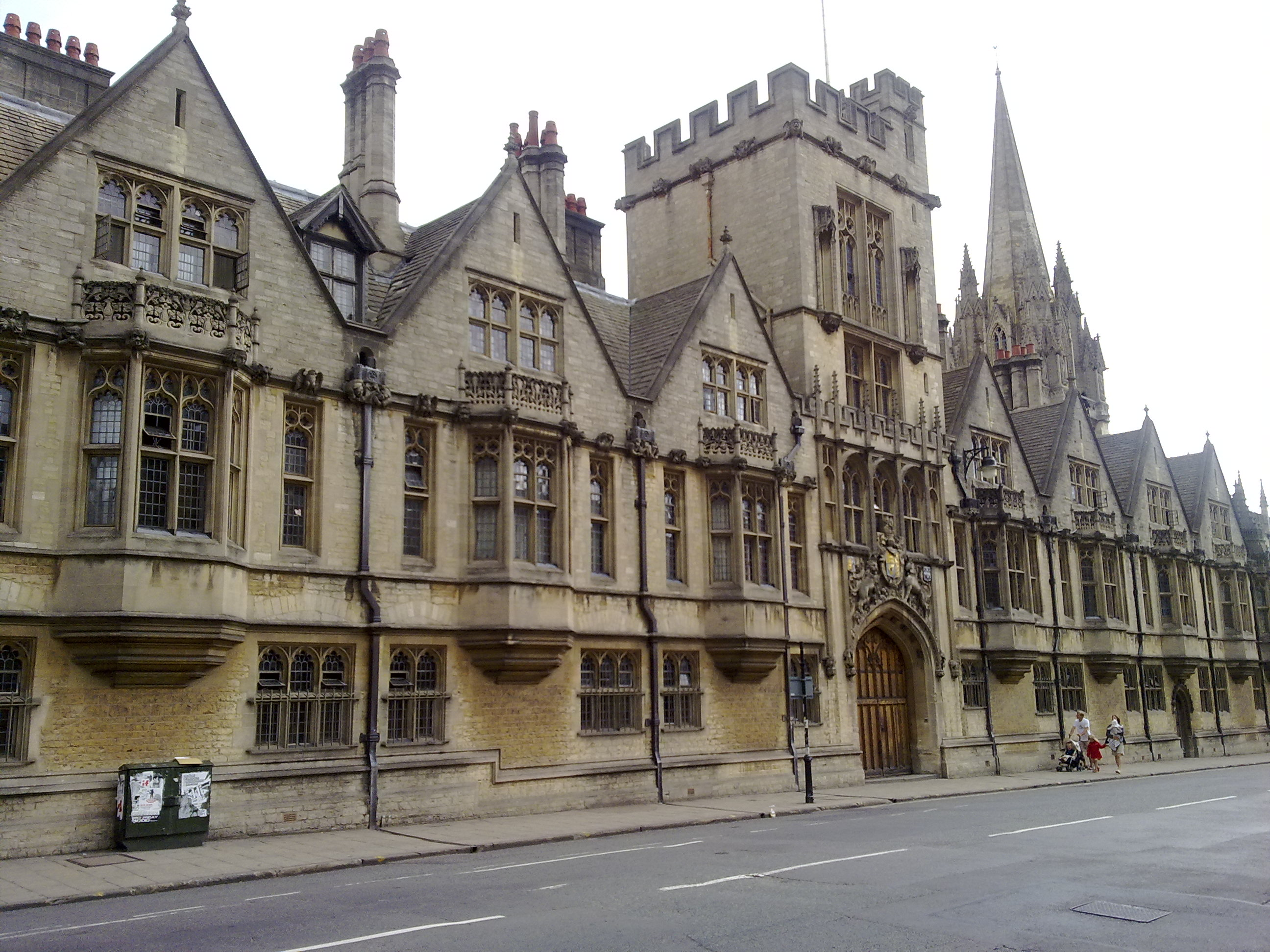
Brasenose College, Oxford (modern photograph)

There were family connections with Brasenose, Heber's brother Richard being a fellow at the time and his father was a former fellow. The head of the college was William Cleaver, a friend of Reginald Senior and frequent visitor to Hodnet Hall. In his first year, Heber won the University Prize for Latin Verse, and began to develop local repute as a Romantic poet. In 1803 he entered a long poem, "Palestine", for the Newdigate Prize. He had been helped in composing it by Walter Scott, a family friend, before Scott's years of fame. The poem was enthusiastically received when Heber declaimed it at that year's Encaenia ceremony. It was later published and set to music by William Crotch (who had been professor of music at Oxford since 1797), and translated into Welsh by W. Owen Pughe in 1822. Montefiore, in 1902, described it as "the most successful and popular piece of religious verse of the first half of the [19th] century". Heber's later biographer Derrick Hughes finds its contemporary acclaim puzzling: "It is not a good, not even a mediocre poem; it is leaden".

The death of Reginald Senior in February 1804 left the living of parish of St Luke, Hodnet vacant, and may have prompted Heber's decision to seek ordination, though he delayed it for some years. In his degree examinations he did honourably rather than brilliantly; Montefiore quotes a contemporary view that Heber's main contribution to university life was in fields outside formal academic success, particularly as a thinker, a poet and an orator: "Reginald Heber was a star whose lustre was as steady as it was clear." He took his bachelor's degree in the summer of 1804 and was elected to a fellowship of All Souls College, Oxford. He also won the university's Bachelor's Prize for an English prose essay.

=== European journey ===
Heber and Thornton had planned to follow their graduation with a Grand Tour of Europe. However, in 1804 the Napoleonic Wars made much of Europe inaccessible, and so they delayed their departure until the summer of 1805 and took a route through Sweden, Norway and Finland to Russia, instead of the usual journey through France and Italy. In July 1805, they sailed for Gothenburg in Sweden, then travelled northward by stage coach, via Vänern and Uddevalla, to Kristiania (Oslo) in Norway. After a short stay there, they moved through the wild Dovre Region to Trondheim, where they observed the practice of skiing for the first time (Heber referred to it as "skating").

They then turned south-east, re-entered Sweden and travelled through Uppsala to Stockholm. Towards the end of September they crossed the Gulf of Bothnia to Åbo (Turku), site of Europe's most northerly university, in the part of Finland then under Swedish rule. They proceeded eastwards and reached St Petersburg at the end of October. They spent two months in the city; through influential British Embassy contacts they visited places generally closed to the public, including Tsar Alexander's private quarters in the Winter Palace. They experienced Muslim worship at first hand as the city's large Muslim population observed Ramadan; Heber described the crowds gathered for prayer in an improvised mosque as "the most decent and attentive congregation [he] had seen since leaving England."

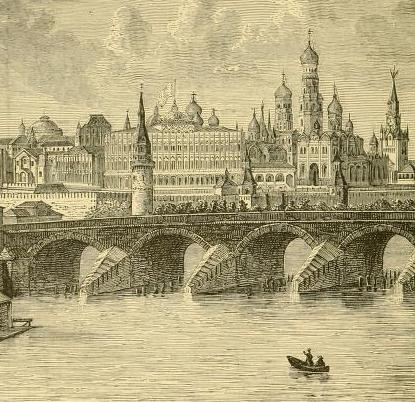
A depiction of the Kremlin in Moscow

Heber and Thornton had meant to remain in St Petersburg until after the New Year, then if possible return home through Germany. This was thwarted by Napoleon's victory at Austerlitz on 2 December 1805 and the treaties that followed. Instead they extended their stay in Russia, leaving St Petersburg on 31 December 1805 by sledge for the 500-mile journey to Moscow, where they arrived on 3 January. They found it a hospitable city—in a letter home Heber refers to it as an "overgrown village"—and they made friends with many of its leading citizens and clergy. They left by stage coach on 13 March, heading south towards the Crimea and the Black Sea. This took them through the Cossack country of the Don River Basin. Heber sent home a vivid account of the night celebrations for Easter at Novo Tcherkask, the Cossack capital: "The soft plaintive chaunt of the choir, and their sudden change at the moment of daybreak to the full chorus of 'Christ is risen' were altogether what a poet or a painter would have studied with delight".

In the Crimea, Heber observed the manners and practices of the region's large Muslim community. He expressed pleasure at being greeted with the oriental salaam. The course of the war in Europe had meanwhile shifted to allow Heber and Thornton to pass through Poland, Hungary, Austria and Germany to the port of Hamburg, by way of Austerlitz, where they heard accounts of the recent battle. While making sketches of the scene, Heber was briefly mistaken for a French spy by local farmers. At Hamburg the two travellers boarded Lord Morpeth's private yacht and sailed for England, arriving at Great Yarmouth on 14 October 1806.

== Rector of Hodnet ==
=== Parish priest ===
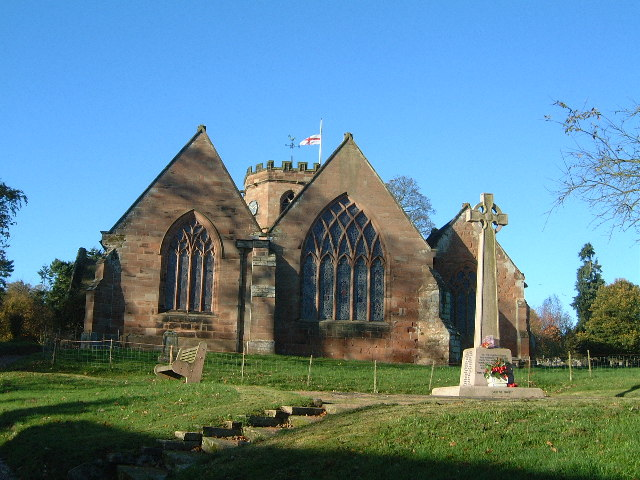
St Luke's Church, Hodnet, Shropshire, where Heber served as rector from 1807 to 1823

On his return to England, Heber prepared for Holy Orders at Oxford, where he found time for literary pursuits, was active in university politics and led a busy social life. He was ordained as deacon at the end of February 1807 and received full priest's orders from the Bishop of Oxford on 24 May 1807. He was then inducted into the family living, as rector of Hodnet; he was later to describe his role as "a half-way station between a parson and a squire". At first he divided his time between his parish and Oxford, where he fulfilled duties at All Souls. He had not at this time determined his own doctrinal position; writing to Thornton he admitted that he was still searching: "Pray for me, my dear friend, that I may have my eyes open to the truth ... and if it please God that I persevere in his ministry I may undertake the charge with a quiet mind and a good conscience". A High churchman by upbringing, Heber was a strong opponent of factional rivalry; he eventually found a place around the midpoint of the Anglican spectrum between the High Church and evangelical wings, with perhaps a slight inclination towards the evangelicals.

On 9 April 1809 Heber married Amelia Shipley, the youngest daughter of William Davies Shipley, the Dean of St Asaph. He withdrew from Oxford, having secured his M.A., and set himself up permanently in the Hodnet rectory; finding this too small for his wife's liking he had the house demolished and a larger replacement built. In September 1813 Heber preached a sermon in Shrewsbury to the British and Foreign Bible Society, a missionary organisation of which he had been a member since his undergraduate days. The sermon ended with what Hughes describes as Heber's first public declaration in support of the work of overseas missions. He refused an appointment as a canon at Durham, preferring to continue his work in Hodnet in which, after 1814, he was assisted by his younger brother, the Revd Thomas Heber, who served as his curate until his death, at the age of 31, in 1816. The employment of a curate enabled Heber to devote more time to his literary pursuits, and to accept an invitation, in 1815, to deliver the Bampton Lectures at Oxford. He chose as his subject "The Personality and the Office of the Christian Comforter"; the series was published in 1822.

In 1817 Heber accepted the post of canon at St Asaph, the relative proximity of which enabled the extra duties to be carried out without interfering with his parish work. His main literary task during these years was a biography and critical study of the complete works of the 17th-century cleric Jeremy Taylor; the works, with Heber's critique, were published in 15 volumes between 1820 and 1822. This period of Heber's life was saddened by the death, on 24 December 1818, of his infant daughter after a short illness. Two more daughters were born later, in 1821 and 1824 respectively; both lived to adulthood. In 1822 Heber was elected to the church office of Preacher of Lincoln's Inn, which would require a regular term of residence in London. He saw this both as an extension of his service to the Church and as a means of renewing contact with old friends.

=== Hymn writer ===
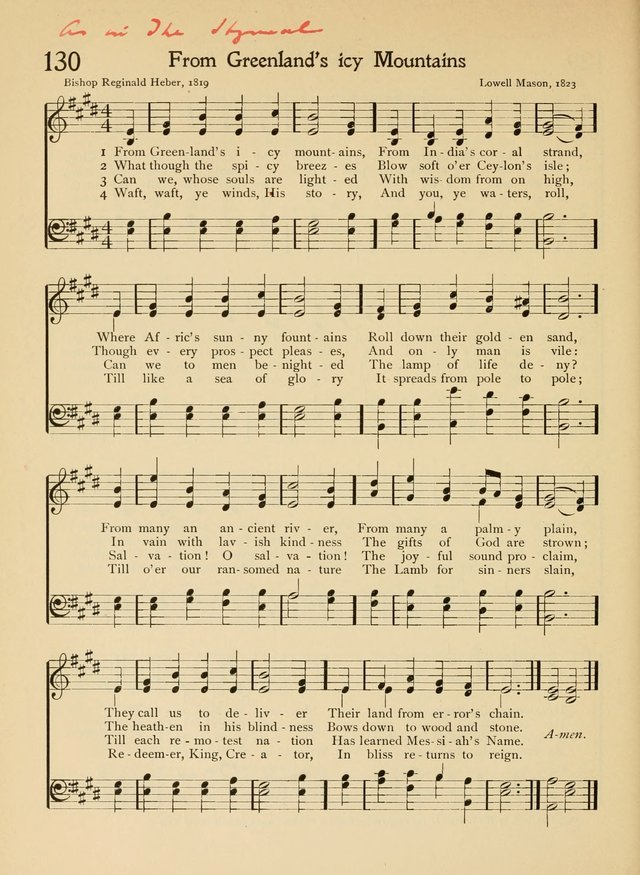
Heber's controversial hymn "From Greenland's Icy Mountains" as published in a school hymnal in 1899

At the start of the 19th century the Anglican authorities officially disapproved of the singing of hymns in churches, other than metrical psalms, although there was considerable informal hymn-singing in parishes. Heber, according to the poet John Betjeman, was a professed admirer of the hymns of John Newton and William Cowper, and was one of the first High Church Anglicans to write his own. In all he wrote 57, mainly between 1811 and 1821. Heber wished to publish his hymns in a collection, in which he proposed to include some by other writers. In October 1820 he sought help from the Bishop of London, William Howley, in obtaining official recognition of his collection from the Archbishop of Canterbury. In a noncommittal reply Howley suggested that Heber should publish the hymns, although he proposed to withhold episcopal approval until public reaction could be gauged. Heber began preparing the publication, but was unable to complete arrangements before his departure for India in 1823. The collection was eventually published in 1827, after Heber's death, as Hymns Written and Adapted to the Weekly Church Service of the Year.

Betjeman characterised Heber's style as consciously literary, with careful choices of adjectives and vivid figures of speech: "poetic imagery was as important as didactic truth". A more recent analysis by J. R. Watson draws attention to Heber's tendency to deliver what he terms "a rather obvious sermon", and to his mixing of powerful description with "a rather trite moralism". A handful of Heber's hymns have survived into popular use into the 21st century.

- Brightest and Best
- Holy, Holy, Holy! Lord God Almighty

One whose popularity has waned is the missionary hymn "From Greenland's Icy Mountains", written in 1819 as part of a country-wide campaign on behalf of the Society for the Propagation of the Gospel (SPG). Watson describes this as "a conspicuous example of that fervent belief to convert the world to Christianity which led Heber and others to lay down their lives in the mission field", and while widely sung until the second half of the 20th century, it was for instance omitted from the 1982 revision of the Episcopal Church hymnal. Betjeman felt that in the modern world, the words of this hymn seem patronising and insensitive to other beliefs, with references to "...every prospect pleases and only man is vile", and to "the heathen in his blindness [bowing] down to wood and stone". These phrases and the assumptions behind them offended Gandhi, who drew attention to them in a speech at YMCA Calcutta (Kolkata) in 1925: "My own experience in my travels throughout India has been to the contrary ... [Man] is not vile. He is as much a seeker after truth as you and I are, possibly more so". Other Heber texts remain popular, and the Dictionary of North American Hymnology notes that most of his hymns remain in use.

== Bishop of Calcutta ==
=== Appointment ===
The see of Calcutta had been established in 1814. It covered much of the Indian subcontinent and Ceylon, together with Australia and parts of southern Africa. The first bishop, Thomas Middleton, who had been consecrated in 1814, died in office in July 1822. At the time the head of the Indian Board of Control was Charles Williams-Wynn, an old Oxford friend of Heber's. In December 1822 Williams-Wynn wrote to Heber, not directly offering his friend the post—the wording appeared to anticipate a refusal—but nevertheless leaving Heber the opportunity to claim the office, should he wish. Heber had a longstanding interest in the work of overseas missions; he supported not only the SPG but also its more recently formed evangelical sister-body, the Church Missionary Society (CMS), and while still at Oxford had helped to found the British and Foreign Bible Society (BFBS).

Heber was attracted to the post, his interest in distant places having been stimulated by his early travels, but his initial response to the implied offer was cautious. He first asked Williams-Wynn whether there was a suitable local man for the appointment and he was told there was not. His next concern was whether his wife and infant daughter should be exposed to the rigours of the Indian climate, and also if his own health was adequate. After consultation with doctors and discussion with his family, Heber wrote to Williams-Wynn on 2 January 1823, refusing the post. Within days he had written again, regretting the refusal and asking if the post was still available, at which Williams-Wynn quickly obtained the formal approval of King George IV to the appointment. Heber spent the next few months at Hodnet preparing for his departure; during this period he gave a farewell sermon at Oxford, after which the degree of Doctor of Divinity (D.D.) was conferred on him. On 1 June 1823 Heber was formally consecrated as Bishop of Calcutta at Lambeth Palace, by the Archbishop of Canterbury. Two weeks later he departed for India with Amelia and his daughter Emily.

=== In office ===
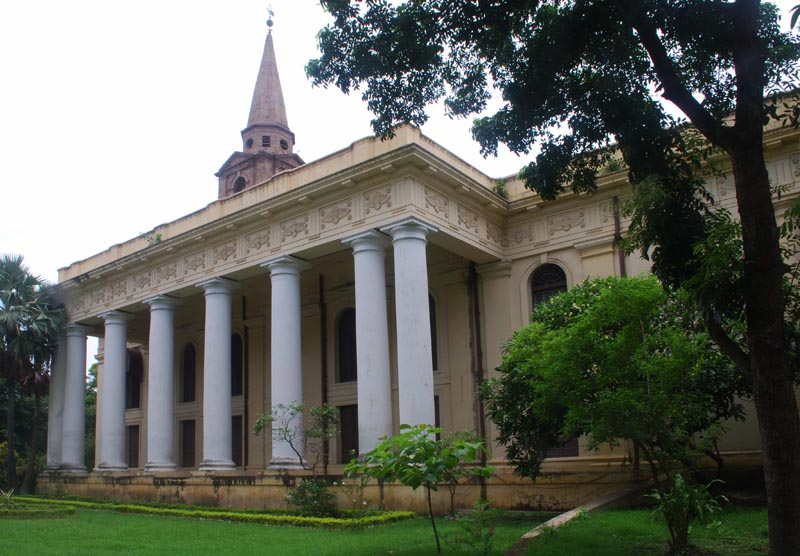
St John's, Calcutta, was the cathedral church for the Calcutta see at the time of Heber's episcopate.

The new bishop arrived in Calcutta on 10 October 1823. After his ceremonial installation by the Governor General, Lord Amherst, Heber preached his first sermon as bishop on Sunday 12 October, in St John's Cathedral Church. He faced many challenges arising from tasks unfinished at the time of his predecessor's death and from the long hiatus without a bishop. A major area of concern was Bishop's College, a training school for local clergy founded by Middleton in 1820, the development of which had stalled due to financial and management problems. Heber reinvigorated the project by extensive fundraising, by persuading the government to increase its grant of land, and by restarting the building programme; within a few months the college boasted a library and a new chapel. In June 1824 Heber, using a power provided to him by recent Act of Parliament, ordained as deacon the first native Indian to receive Holy Orders.

Heber was interested in all aspects of Indian life and quickly made friends, both with the local population and with the representatives of non-Anglican churches. Occasionally his easy manner and lavish hospitality clashed with the principles of the more puritan and evangelical of his clergy; one such, Isaac Wilson of the CMS, used a sermon to mount a direct attack on the bishop after what he considered were excessive celebrations following a baptismal service. Wilson was forced to apologise after Heber threatened him with a Consistory court.

=== Travels ===
An early 19th-century depiction of Benares (Varanasi), visited by Heber in August–September 1824

On 15 June 1824 Heber set out on a tour of northern India, accompanied by his personal chaplain, Martin Stowe, and Daniel Corrie, the Archdeacon of Calcutta. Amelia remained in Calcutta; earlier in the year she had given birth to her third daughter, Harriet. The general plan was to travel by boat to the upper waters of the River Ganges, then overland into the foothills of the Himalayas before turning south and west, crossing Rajputana to reach Bombay. The journey was almost aborted near to its beginning when Stowe fell ill in Dacca (present-day Dhaka, Bangladesh) and died there; after some hesitation, Heber decided that the tour should continue. Early in August the party reached Benares (now Varanasi), the largest of the cities in the Ganges plain, where Heber spent several weeks. It was a wholly Indian city without a European population, sacred to Hindus, Sikhs and Buddhists but with a well-established CMS school and a substantial Christian minority. Heber consecrated a new church, and when he conducted a Holy Communion service in both English and Hindustani, a large congregation of Christians and Hindus thronged the church.

The party left Benares in mid-September. After reaching Allahabad they continued overland, accompanied by an armed troop of sepoys. On 28 November they reached their farthest northerly point, at Almora in the Kumaon region. Their subsequent path southward took them to Delhi, the ancient Mughal capital, where Heber was presented to the ageing emperor Akbar Shah II in his dilapidated palace; Heber wrote of the emperor as "the venerable ruin of a mighty stock". In the final stages of the journey to Bombay, at Nadiad, Heber met with Sahajanand Swami, the region's leading Hindu religious leader. Heber had hopes of converting the Swami to Christianity, but was disappointed in the meeting since he failed to do so. On 19 April Heber arrived in Bombay, to be greeted a week later by Amelia and his daughters, who had arrived by sea from Calcutta.

Heber remained in Bombay for four months, and then decided that, instead of sailing directly for Calcutta, he would visit Ceylon on the way. He arrived at Galle on 25 August and spent five weeks touring the main cities before departing for Calcutta where he arrived on 19 October 1825 after an absence of 16 months.

=== Final months ===
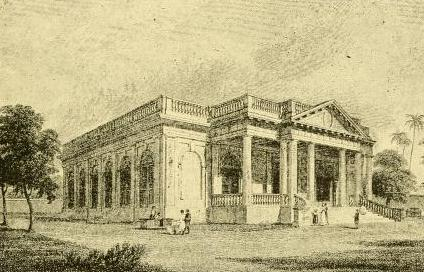
St John's church in Trichinopoly, where Heber preached his last sermon and where he is buried

Heber wished to pass on to the Governor General, Lord Amherst, much of what he had learned and observed on his long voyage, and on his return to Calcutta busied himself with a series of detailed reports. He also wrote to Williams-Wynn in London, strongly criticising the East India Company's stewardship of its Indian territories. He was concerned that few Indians were promoted to senior posts, and noted the "bullying, insolent manner" towards Indians that was widespread amongst the Company authorities. Many local matters also demanded Heber's attention: the next phase in the development of Bishop's College, the preparation of a Hindustani dictionary, and a series of ordinations including that of Abdul Masih, an elderly Lutheran whose reception into Anglican orders had earlier been resisted by Bishop Middleton, on unspecified grounds

In spite of the pressures on his time, Heber set out again on 30 January 1826, this time heading south for Madras, Pondicherry, Tanjore, and ultimately Travancore. One reason for the tour was to examine the issue of caste, which persisted in Southern India. In Tanjore on Easter Day, 26 March 1826, Heber preached to more than 1300, and on the following day conducted a confirmation service for a large Tamil congregation. On 1 April he moved on to Trichinopoly where, next day, he confirmed 42 people. On 3 April, after attending an early-morning service at which he gave a blessing in the Tamil language, Heber returned to his bungalow for a cold bath. Immediately after plunging into the water he died, possibly from the shock of the cold water in the intense heat. Watson records that a contemporary engraving shows his body "being carried from the bath by his servant and chaplain, the latter immaculately attired in a frock coat and top hat". His funeral was held the next day at St John's church, where he had preached his final sermon; he was buried within the church, on the north side of the altar.

== Memorials and legacy ==
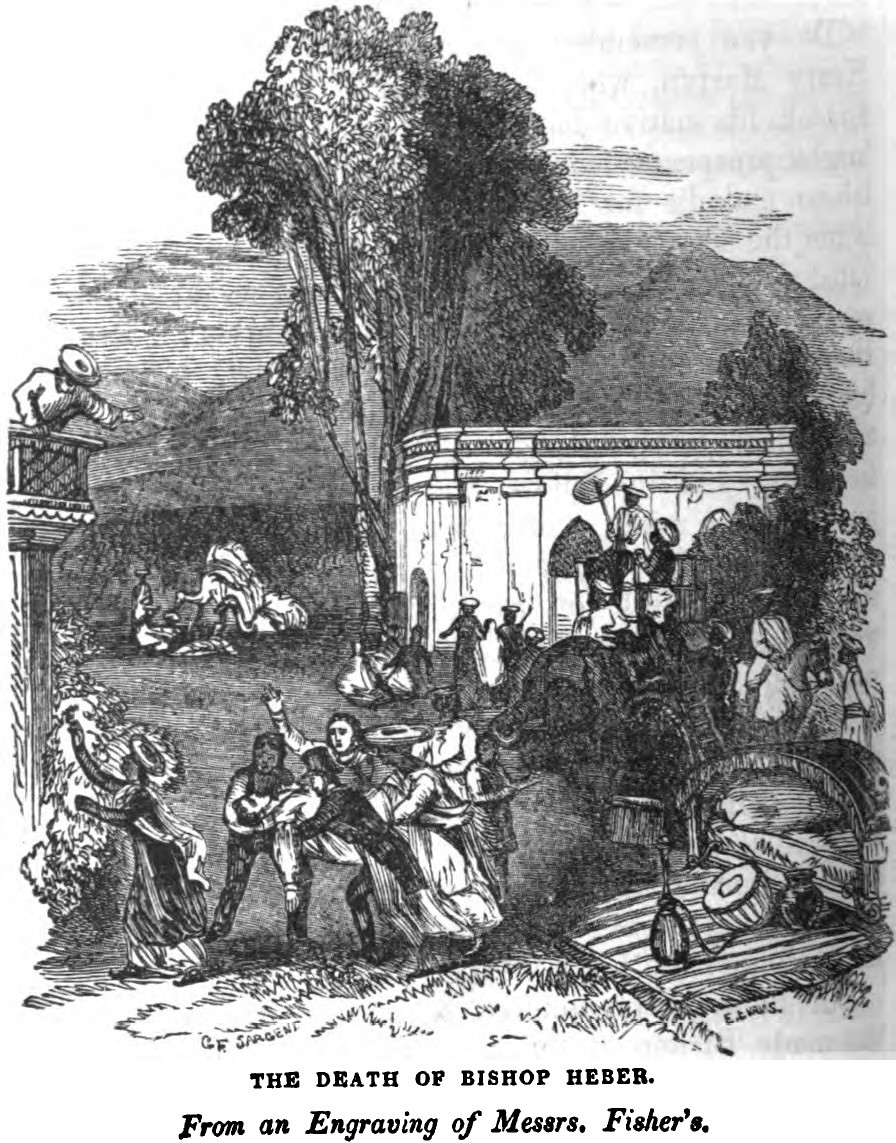
The death of Bishop Heber, from an 1848 engraving

Although Heber's episcopate had been brief he had made a considerable impression, and news of his death brought many tributes from around India. Sir Charles Grey, an old Oxford friend who was serving as Calcutta's Chief Justice, spoke of Heber's cheerfulness, his lack of self-importance, his good humour, patience and kindness. Flags were flown at half-mast in Madras and Calcutta, and the Governor-General ordered a salute of 42 guns—one for each completed year of the bishop's life. In several cities public subscriptions were opened to raise funds for monuments. In St John's church in Trichinopoly, initially a simple plaque above the grave recorded the date and place of Heber's death; this was in due course made much more elaborate. In St George's church, Madras, a large sculpture by Francis Chantrey was erected, depicting Heber ministering to members of his flock. Reflecting Heber's interest in the training of local ordinands, further funds were raised to provide Heber scholarships at Bishop's College; in Trichinopoly a school founded by the German missionary Christian Friedrich Schwarz became the Heber Memorial School.

It took four months for reports of Heber's death to reach England. At Oxford, representatives of Brasenose and All Souls opened a fund for an appropriate memorial; this idea was taken over by Williams-Wynn, who wanted a national rather than an Oxford-based monument. From the large sum collected, Chantrey was paid £3,000 for a huge marble sculpture that was placed in St Paul's Cathedral, London. More modest memorials were raised in the parish churches at Hodnet and Malpas. At the time of Heber's episcopacy, Australia formed part of the Diocese of Calcutta and, following Heber's death, a schoolhouse was erected at St Paul's, Cobbitty, New South Wales and named the Heber Chapel. During his time in St Asaph, Heber became a good friend of the poet, Felicia Hemans, and in 1826 she published a poetic tribute "To the Memory of Bishop Heber" in The Asiatic Journal. Another tribute was provided by Letitia Elizabeth Landon with her poetical illustration to an engraving of a painting by H. Melville on the Death of Heber in Fisher's Drawing Room Scrap Book, 1839.

Heber was soon commemorated in print; as well as the publication of his hymns collection in 1827, the journal that he had kept during his northern India tour of 1824–25 was published in 1828 and proved a great commercial success. Less popular was the three-volume biography and letters collection that Amelia published in 1830. In the ensuing years various collections of Heber's poetry appeared. Hughes observes that although some of the lighter verses are neat and amusing, the general quality is such that had Heber been only a poet, he would quickly have been forgotten. He achieved a more lasting niche as a hymn-writer; according to Hughes, among his hymns with enduring appeal are the Epiphany hymn "Brightest and best of the sons of the morning"; "The Son of God Goes Forth to War", dedicated to the church's saints and martyrs, and the Trinity Sunday hymn "Holy, Holy, Holy, Lord God Almighty". The last one is probably the most widely known of all Trinity hymns and owes a great deal of its popularity to John Bacchus Dykes's tune "Nicea": Watson observes that the tune's "magnificent grandeur carries the long lines effortlessly". Hughes mentions two more Heber hymns that, he says, deserve to be better known: "God that madest earth and heaven" and "By cool Siloam's shady rill".

Heber's pioneering commitment to the mission fields was expressed, half a century after his death, by the author Charlotte Mary Yonge: "Heber was one of the first English churchmen who perceived that to enlarge her borders and strengthen her stakes was the bounden duty of the living Church". He led through example, and through his writings which "did much to spread knowledge of, and therefore interest in, the field of labour in which he died". The Anglican Church of Canada commemorates Heber on 4 April each year.

In July 1830 Amelia Heber married Count Demetrius Valsamachi, a Greek diplomat who became a British subject and was later knighted by Queen Victoria. Amelia lived until 1870. Her daughter Emily married Algernon Percy, the son of the Bishop of Carlisle, and the younger daughter Harriet married a son of Heber's friend John Thornton.

== Arms ==
Coat of arms of Reginald Heber
Escutcheon Per fess Azure and Gules a lion rampant Or in the dexter chief point a mullet Argent.

== See also ==
- Christianity in India
