= The Son of God Goes Forth to War =

1812 hymn by Reginald Heber

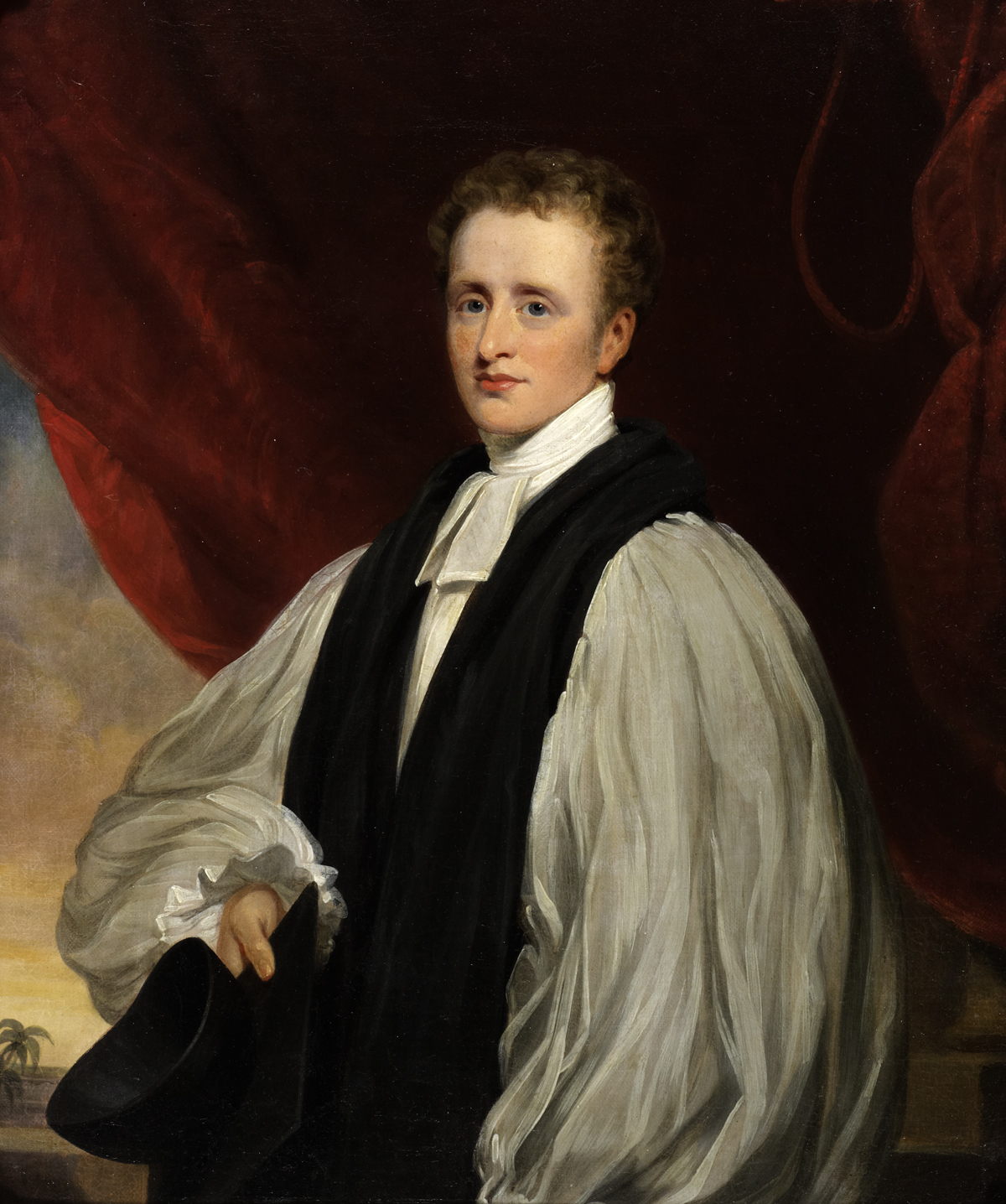
- Reginald Heber
- Genre: Hymn
- Written: 1812
- Text: Reginald Heber
- Language: English
- Based on: Zechariah 14:3
- Meter: 8.6.8.6 D
- Melody: "All Saints New" by Henry Stephen Cutler, "Greyoaks" by Gregory Wilbur

"The Son of God Goes Forth to War" (1812) is a hymn by Reginald Heber which appears, with reworked lyrics, in the novella The Man Who Would Be King (1888), by Rudyard Kipling and, set to the Irish tune "The Moreen" / "The Minstrel Boy", in the film The Man Who Would Be King (1975), directed by John Huston. It was American general George S. Patton's favourite hymn, and was sung at his funeral. In religious use, it is more often sung to Henry Stephen Cutler's 1872 tune "All Saints New", which was written for it. It is also sung in some churches to the tune "Greyoaks", written for it by Gregory Wilbur.

The Son of God goes forth to war,
A kingly crown to gain;
His blood red banner streams afar:
Who follows in His train?
Who best can drink his cup of woe,
Triumphant over pain,
Who patient bears his cross below,
He follows in his train.

That martyr first, whose eagle eye
Could pierce beyond the grave;
Who saw his Master in the sky,
And called on him to save.
Like Him, with pardon on his tongue,
In midst of mortal pain,
He prayed for them that did the wrong:
Who follows in his train?

A glorious band, the chosen few
On whom the Spirit came;
Twelve valiant saints, their hope they knew,
And mocked the cross and flame.
They met the tyrant's brandished steel,
The lion's gory mane;
They bowed their heads the death to feel:
Who follows in their train?

A noble army, men and boys,
The matron and the maid,
Around the Saviour's throne rejoice,
In robes of light arrayed.
They climbed the steep ascent of heaven,
Through peril, toil and pain;
O God, to us may grace be given,
To follow in their train.
