= Hodnet =

Village in Shropshire, England

Coordinates: 52.853°N 2.5758°W

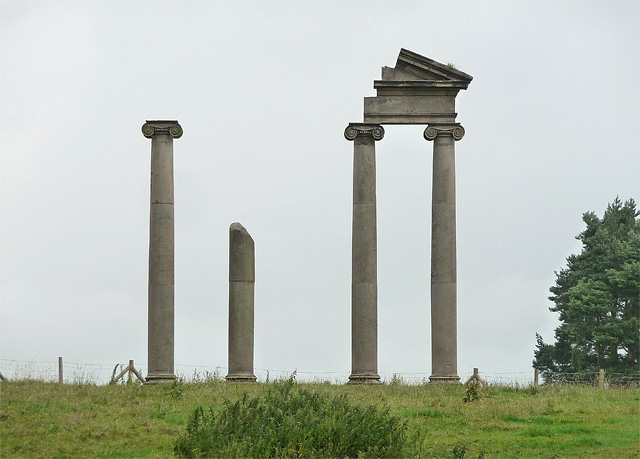
- Former monumental portico standing as a Hodnet landmark

- Location within Shropshire
- Population: 1,534 (2011)
- OS grid reference: SJ613286
- Civil parish: Hodnet
- Unitary authority: Shropshire
- Ceremonial county: Shropshire
- Region: West Midlands
- Country: England
- Sovereign state: United Kingdom
- Post town: Market Drayton
- Postcode district: TF9
- Dialling code: 01630
- Police: West Mercia
- Fire: Shropshire
- Ambulance: West Midlands
- UK Parliament: The Wrekin

Hodnet (/hɒdnɪt/ HOD-nit) is a village and civil parish in Shropshire, England. The town of Market Drayton lies 5.7 miles (9.2 km) north-east of the village. In 2011 the parish had a population of 1534.

== History ==
Evidence of a Bronze Age burial site was discovered during construction of the bypass in 2002.

The Anglo-Saxon settlement, which had a chapel, was the centre of Odenet, a royal manor belonging to Edward the Confessor and held by Roger de Montgomery who supported William the Conqueror after 1066. Hodnet was recorded in the Domesday Book as Odenet.

Baldwin de Hodenet built a motte and bailey castle in about 1082 possibly on a moated mound from earlier times. The timber castle was rebuilt in sandstone around 1196 but was burned down in 1264. Hodnet Castle was mentioned in a document of 1223. Odo de Hodnet was granted the right to hold a weekly fair and an annual market by Henry III in the mid-13th century and the village grew to the north and east of the castle by the 12th-century church.

In 1752 the estate passed from the Vernons, who had lived there for 250 years to the Hebers whose descendants still own the property. Hodnet Old Hall was a timber-framed manor house surrounded by the park which was recorded on Christopher Saxton's Map of Shropshire in the late-16th century. The old hall was demolished in 1870 when a new hall in the neo-Elizabethan style was built. The gardens were developed in the 1920s. In the 20th century the hall was used as a convalescent hospital during the world wars and in World War II there was an airfield in the grounds for the storage and dispersal of aircraft from Ternhill and RAF Shawbury.

== Governance ==
Hodnet was the meeting place of an Anglo-Saxon hundred which continued to function after the Norman Conquest. Hodnet is recorded in the Domesday Book as Odenet, and the village's 17th-century Hundred House was named for this reason. The tenant-in-chief was Roger de Montgomery. Its hundred court was merged and moved, during the reign of King Henry I (1100–1135), into the Hundred of North Bradford, which was active until the late-19th century.

Hodnet was the centre of a large ecclesiastical parish containing the hamlets of Little Bolas, Hawkstone, Hopton, Kenstone, Lostford, Marchamley, Peplow, and Wollerton and the chapelries of Weston-under-Redcastle and Wixhill. Under the terms of the Poor Law Amendment Act 1834, it was part of the Drayton Poor Law Union, electing two members to its Board of Guardians. Hodnet has had a parish council since 1895.

Shropshire Council, a Unitary authority is responsible for local government services in Hodnet. The population of this ward at the 2011 census was 4,429. The village is in the North Shropshire parliamentary constituency.

== Geography ==
Hodnet is on the A53 road from Shrewsbury to Newcastle-under-Lyme and the Staffordshire Potteries. The ancient parish covered 10,700 acres of fertile arable land. The underlying geology consists of red Bridgnorth Sandstone which is covered with glacial till forming a rolling landscape while the flood plain of the River Tern is flat. Marl deposited by retreating glaciers was dug for fertilizer and the resultant marl pits are now wildlife habitats.

== Transport ==
The four-mile Hodnet bypass, the A53 opened in 2003 at a cost £14 million, taking traffic on the old A53 and A442 roads away from the village's narrow streets. It was built by contractors Alfred McAlpine.

Hodnet railway station was a stop on the Wellington and Market Drayton Railway, which opened in 1867 and was operated by the Great Western Railway. Lack of use forced the line to close to passenger traffic on 9 September 1963, and to freight four years later.

=== Bus Service ===
Hodnet is served by the 64 route, operated by Arriva Midlands North, which runs between Shrewsbury and Market Drayton via Shawbury. Once at Market Drayton, some 64 bus services form a 164 service and continue on to Hanley in Staffordshire.

Bus services in Hodnet, Shropshire
| Bus operator | Route | Destination(s) | Notes |
|---|---|---|---|
| Arriva Midlands North | 64 | Shrewsbury → Shawbury → Hodnet → Tern Hill → Market Drayton | Some services continue to Hanley via Newcastle-under-Lyme. |

== Landmarks ==
The motte and bailey castle is a scheduled monument in the grounds of Hodnet Old Hall surrounded by Hodnet Park which incorporates elements of a medieval deer park.

Hawkstone Hall in Hawkstone Park adjoining the village was the seat of the Viscounts Hill.

== Religion ==
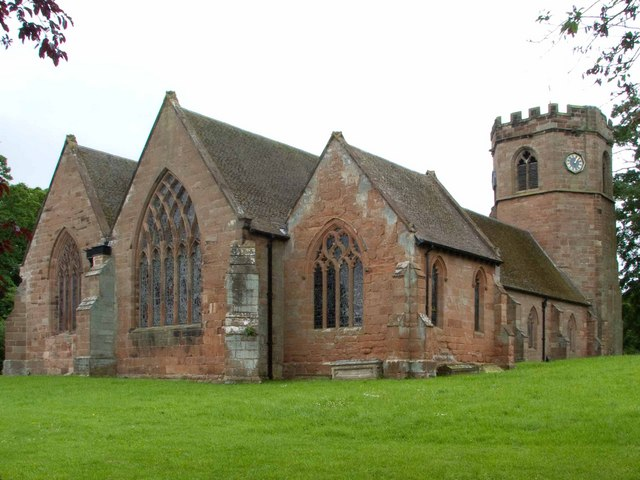
St Luke's Church

St Luke's Church has an early foundation and retains much of its Norman nave. It was extended in the 14th century and its octagonal tower dates from this time. The church was restored in 1846. The church has some notable stained glass windows including one by David Evans depicting the evangelists and is connected with the story of the Holy Grail of Arthurian legend.

== Economy ==
The village also has two shops and the Bear at Hodnet public house. There is a florist and a crockery shop.

== Education ==
Hodnet Primary School has 177 pupils, and is maintained by Shropshire County Council. There is no provision of secondary education in the village.

== Notable people ==
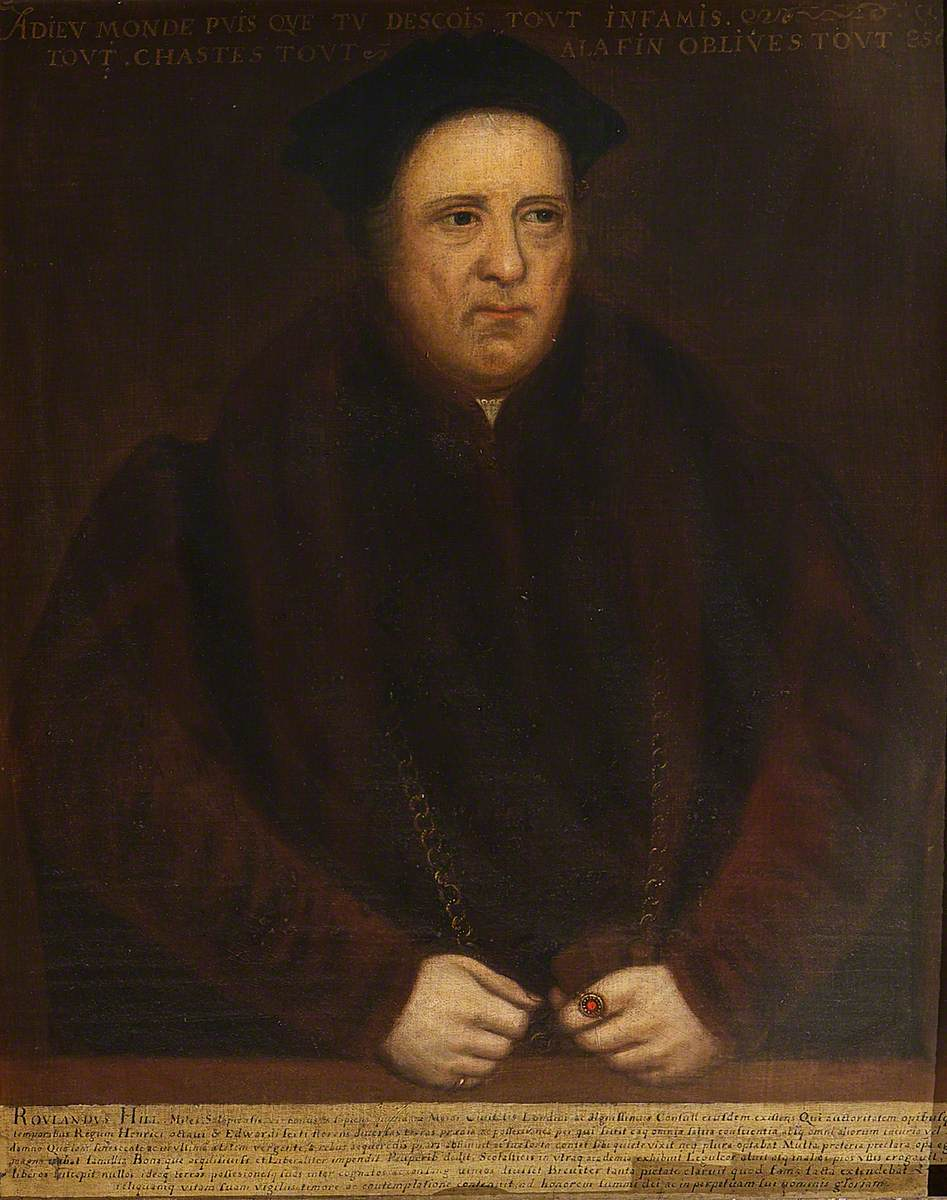
- Sir Rowland Hill, who coordinated the Geneva Bible translation.
  Sir Rowland Hill (c.1495–1561) the first Protestant Lord Mayor of London, a merchant, statesman and philanthropist who coordinated the Geneva Bible translation.
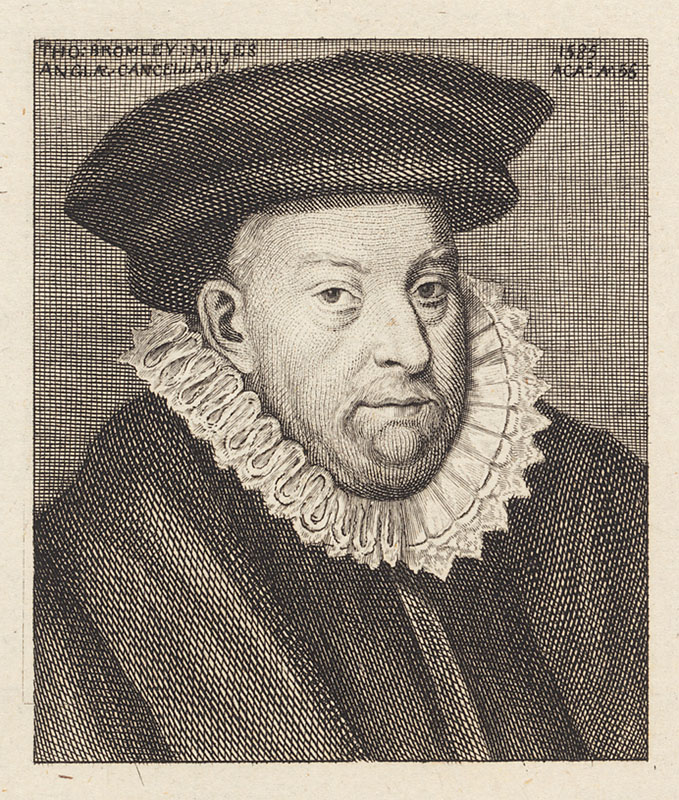
- Sir Thomas Bromley who presided over the trial of Mary, Queen of Scots
  Sir Thomas Bromley Tudor lawyer, judge and Lord Chancellor who rose to prominence during the reign of Elizabeth I
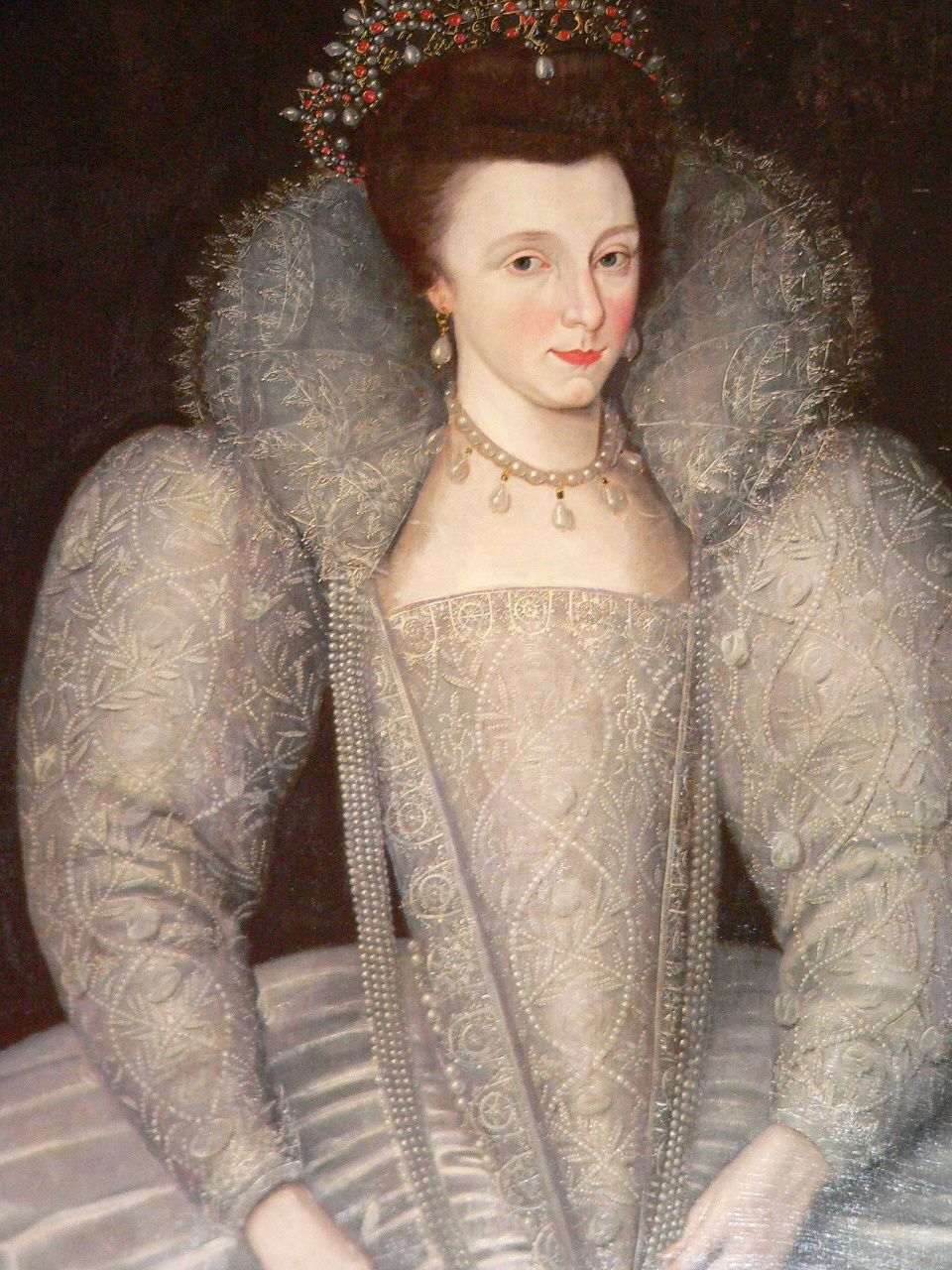
  Elizabeth, Countess of Southampton, c.1590
- Elizabeth Wriothesley, Countess of Southampton (1572–1655) lady-in-waiting of Elizabeth I and wife of Shakespeare's patron the Henry Wriothesley, 3rd Earl of Southampton. She has been identified as possibly the inspiration of the 'Dark Lady' in Shakespeare's sonnets. Others have linked her to Juliet in Romeo and Juliet.
- Reginald Heber (1783–1826) hymn writer, Rector of Hodnet 1807–1823 and Bishop of Calcutta
- Reginald Cholmondeley (1826 at Hodnet -1896 at Hodnet), English landowner, artist and art collector, was son of another Rector of Hodnet.
- George Campbell Macaulay (1852–1915) a noted English Classical scholar
- William Herrick Macaulay (1853–1936) a British mathematician
- Reginald Macaulay (1858–1937) a footballer with Old Etonians F.C. who played in three FA Cup Finals
- Mary Cholmondeley (1859–1925) an English novelist, lived in Hodnet until about 1896.
- Robert Heber-Percy (1911-1987) an English eccentric, grew up at Hodnet Hall.
- Tom Bush (1914–1969) an English footballer who played 61 games for Liverpool.
- Tim Brookshaw (1929–1981) an English National Hunt champion jockey and horse trainer, who is buried in Hodnet churchyard.
- Lou Dalton (1971– ) Menswear designer and senior tutor at the Royal College of Art.

== Sport ==
Hodnet has a cricket club, Hodnet and Peplow CC. Its first eleven play in the Rollinson Smith Shropshire Cricket League Division 3.

FC Hodnet, a football club formed for the 2007–08 season, played at the Hodnet Social Club. The club won the Shropshire Alliance football league on 10 May 2008 and then competed in the Shropshire County Premier Football League, which became the Mercian Regional Football League since the 2008–09 season onwards. Starting in Division One, after two seasons the team were promoted to the Premier Division in 2010. The following year FC Hodnet won the Premier Division Cup, beating Haughmond in the final at Ellesmere. FC Hodnet folded at the end of the 2016–17 season.

Hodnet Social Football Club, originating in the late 1990s, competed in the Telford Sunday League until 2012.

Hodnet FC was re-formed in 2018 and currently competes in the new Shropshire County League Premier Division, the 11th tier of the English football league system.

== See also ==
- Listed buildings in Hodnet
