= Encaenia =

Academic or ecclesiastical ceremony

Encaenia (/ɛnˈsiːniə/ en-SEE-nee-ə) is an academic or sometimes ecclesiastical ceremony, usually performed at colleges or universities. It generally occurs some time near the annual ceremony for the general conferral of degrees to students. The word is from Latin, meaning dedication or consecration, and is ultimately derived from the Ancient Greek ἐγκαίνια (enkainia), meaning a festival of renewal or dedication, and corresponds to the English term commencement.

The term was originally used to indicate the eight days of celebration for the dedication of the Church of the Holy Sepulchre in Jerusalem, which celebration covered also to the discovering of the True Cross by Empress Helena in 326. Because the Church of the Holy Sepulchre was consecrated on September 13, 335, the encaenia started on September 13, while the cross itself was brought outside the church on September 14 so that the clergy and faithful could pray before the True Cross (Feast of the Cross).

== United Kingdom ==
At certain universities, encaenia is an annual ceremony typically involving the presentation of honorary degrees to distinguished alumni and to distinguished personages from the worlds of arts and sciences. In most British universities, it corresponds to part of graduation.

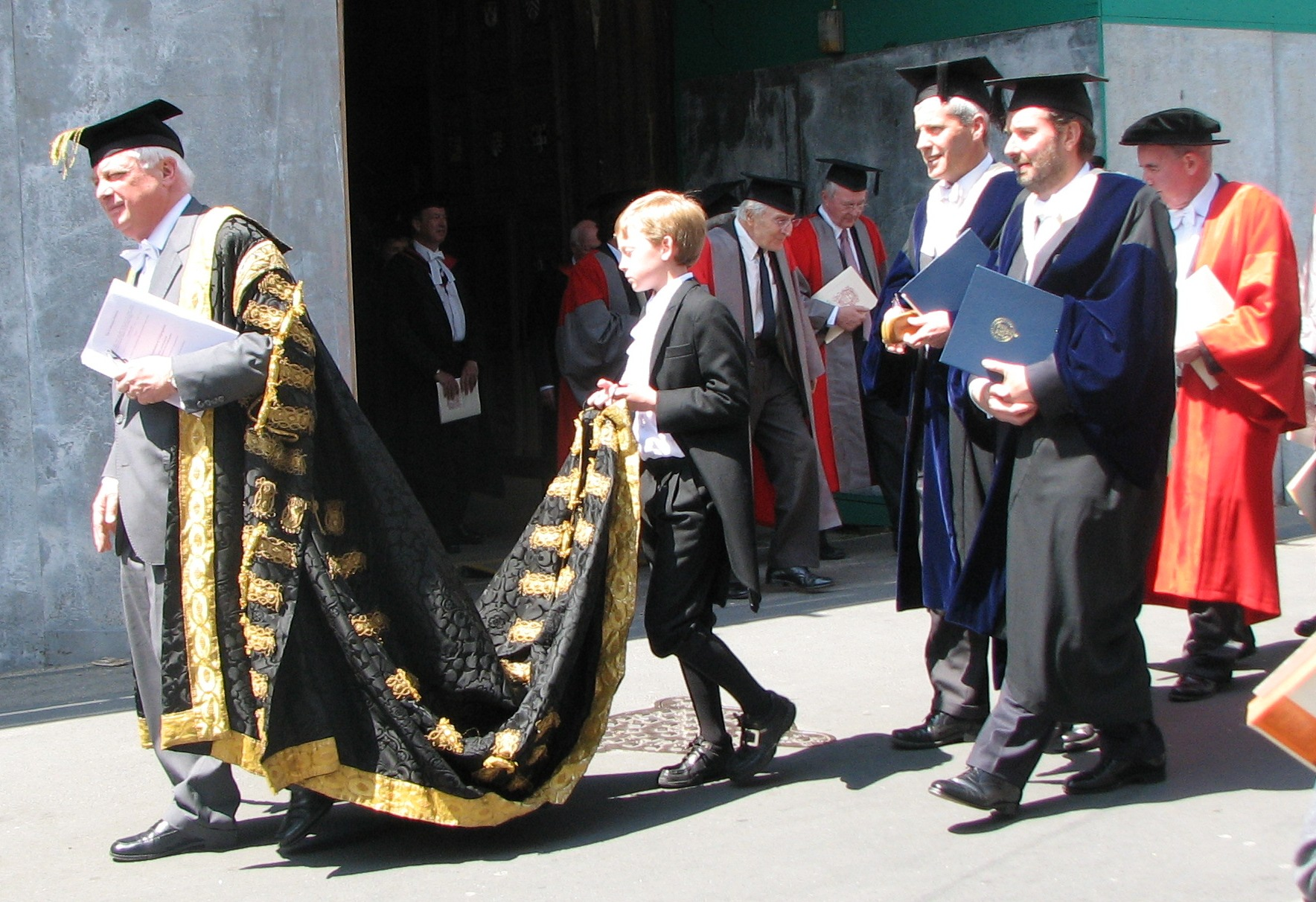
The Chancellor of the University of Oxford leads Congregation out of the Sheldonian theatre after encaenia 2009.

The most famous encaenia is the ceremony at the University of Oxford, which usually takes place on the Wednesday of the ninth week of Trinity Term (i.e. a Wednesday in the latter part of June). Preceding the ceremony is a procession of some of the participants to the Sheldonian Theatre, inside which the main event takes place. Those who take part in the procession are the Chancellor, Vice-Chancellor, and Pro-Vice-Chancellors, the Heads of Houses (i.e. the university's colleges, societies, and halls), the four Heads of Division (i.e. the divisions of Humanities; Mathematical, Physical and Life Sciences; Medical Sciences; and Social Sciences), holders of Higher Doctorates (i.e. those in Divinity, Civil Law, Medicine, Letters, Science, and Music), the Proctors, the Assessor, the Public Orator, the Professor of Poetry, and the Registrar, together with the outgoing President of the Oxford University Student Union, and the Presidents of the Junior and Middle Common Rooms of the colleges to which the Proctors and the Assessor belong.

Oxford's encaenia is depicted in the film Shadowlands, the Morse episode "Twilight of the Gods", and Jeffrey Archer's novel Not a Penny More, Not a Penny Less.

== United States ==
At Fordham University, encaenia is the evening shortly before commencement on which the college honors the graduating class with awards and prizes following a procession of candidates and faculty in academic regalia, often joined by trustees and administrators. The graduates in turn bid farewell in the persons of the class valedictorian and, in a humorous yet loving way, the honorary "Lord" or "Lady of the Manor".

== See also ==
- Newdigate Prize
