= Hodnet Hall =

Country house and estate in Shropshire, England

Coordinates: 52°51′3″N 2°34′52″W

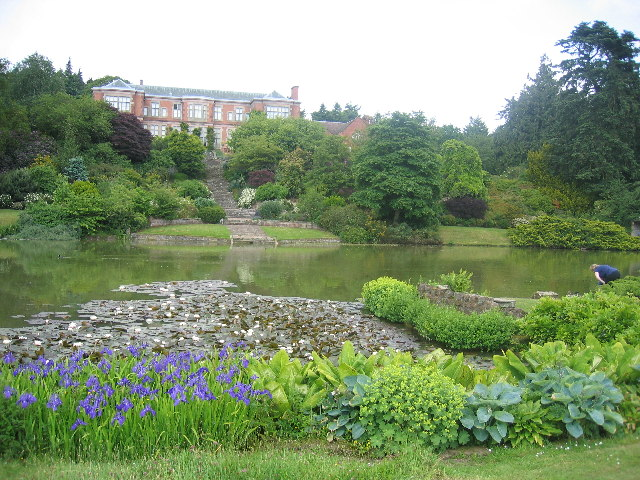
View of the hall from lake

Hodnet Hall is a country house and estate in Hodnet, Shropshire, England.

Hodnet Old Hall was a timber-framed manor house surrounded by the park which was recorded on Christopher Saxton's Map of Shropshire in the late 16th century. Historically it was owned by the Heber family, the family of the noted English cleric Reginald Heber. In 1752 a Richard Heber received the manor and estate as a bequest from a cousin of his wife. On Richard Heber's death in 1766 his brother, named Reginald, who had taken Holy Orders and was co-rector of the parish of Malpas in Cheshire, inherited the estate. The old hall was demolished in 1870 when a new hall in the neo-Elizabethan style was built.

It was the boyhood home of Robert Heber-Percy, known as "the Mad Boy" and "an English eccentric in the grand tradition".

In the 20th century the hall was used as a convalescent hospital during the world wars, and in World War II there was an airfield in the grounds for the storage and dispersal of aircraft from Ternhill and RAF Shawbury.

Today the hall is particularly noted for its gardens, listed Grade II in Historic England's Register of Parks and Gardens. It was created in 1922 when rare trees, shrubs and a chain of seven lakes and pools was added. The gardens contains rhododendrons, camellias, crocuses, daffodils and magnolias. They are open to the public on Wednesdays, Sundays and Bank Holidays from early March to late October.
