= Michael Wynn, 7th Baron Newborough =

- Born: 24 April 1917
- Died: 11 October 1998 (aged 81); Istanbul, Turkey
- Military career
- Allegiance: United Kingdom
- Branch: British Army (1935–1940); Royal Naval Volunteer Reserve (1941–1946)
- Service years: 1935–1946
- Nickname: Mickey
- Commands: MTB 74
- Conflicts: Second World War: Battle of France; St. Nazaire Raid
- Awards: Distinguished Service Cross
- Other work: Farmer

Robert Charles Michael Vaughan Wynn, 7th Baron Newborough, DSC (24 April 1917 – 11 October 1998) was a British peer and Royal Naval Volunteer Reserve officer who played a decisive role during the St. Nazaire Raid in 1942 where he commanded a Motor Torpedo Boat. Captured after his boat had to be abandoned, he was sent to Colditz after an escape attempt. He was repatriated after feigning illness.

== Early life ==
Born the eldest son of Sir Robert Vaughan Wynn, 6th Baron Newborough, and Ruby Irene Severne, he was educated at Oundle School.

== Military career ==
=== British Army ===
In 1935 Wynn was commissioned into the 9th Lancers, then joined the 5th Royal Inniskilling Dragoon Guards and the 16/5th Lancers. He was invalided out of the British Army in 1940. In May 1940, now a civilian, he was given command of a yacht acting as the Air Sea Rescue boat for the Naval air station at Lee-on-Solent. While British forces were being evacuated from northern France he sailed to Dunkirk, and made five successful trips before being hit by shellfire just making Ramsgate. Wynn then took command of a Norfolk fishing boat and went to beaches south of Calais where it was thought the Guards were hiding in the sand dunes. Wearing naval uniform in case he was taken for a spy he searched for but never found the Guards. The Royal Navy recognising his abilities gave him a commission in the Royal Naval Volunteer Reserve (RNVR) in July 1941.

=== Royal Navy ===
Stationed at HMS Hornet, a Coastal Forces shore base in Gosport, he was involved with a plan to attack the German battleships Scharnhorst and Gneisenau. The plan involved a motor torpedo boat specially modified during construction by Vosper Thornycroft, the MTB 74, which was specially built to house torpedo tubes on its foredeck instead of midships. The mission would be to fire the modified torpedoes over the anti-submarine net in Brest harbour where they would sink to the sea-bed and explode after a time delay. The weapons were nicknamed 'Wynn's weapons'. The MTB entered service in December 1941. However while this experiment was being trialled, the German ships made a daring escape from Brest to the Baltic, nicknamed the "Channel Dash". Left without a mission, MTB 74 was instead re-tasked to the St. Nazaire raid where it was proposed she could torpedo the inner caisson of the Normandy Dock or a lockgate to the Submarine Basin. Further tests were carried out prior to the raid on St Nazaire and adjustments made to the delayed-action mechanism of the torpedoes which were fired by MTB 74.

==== St Nazaire ====
On 28 March 1942, Sub-Lieutenant Wynn was to play a decisive part in the raid on St. Nazaire, the only port on the Atlantic seaboard in which the newly completed German battleship Tirpitz could be docked. The plan, code-named Operation Chariot, entailed a former US Navy destroyer, HMS Campbeltown, carrying 24 time-fused Amatol explosive charges, ramming the gates of St. Nazaire harbour. The ship was to also carry commandos who were tasked with destroying shore-based installations. The charges in Campbeltown would later explode and hopefully destroy the dock caisson. If this was not successful, MTB 74 commanded by Sub-Lieutenant Micky Wynn, was to be armed with two delayed-action torpedoes to be fired at the dock caisson. Also deployed to the raid were two destroyers, a Motor Gun Boat and 16 Motor Launches.

The Chariot force sailed from Falmouth with MTB 74 towed by Campbeltown. The MTB was equipped with three Packard engines capable of almost 40 knots (74 km/h) and two Ford V8s which were designed for manoeuvring at 6 knots (11 km/h). Too fast with one combination of engines and too slow with the other, the MTB was put onto tow until the convoy reached St. Nazaire. The ships crossed 400 miles (640 km) of open sea and were three miles (5 km) up the Loire estuary before the Germans opened fire. Campbeltown, which was flying the German ensign, immediately replied in German by Morse and Aldis lamp, and the enemy batteries held their fire, allowing Campbeltown to move closer to the docks. At 1.27 am and closing on the gate, Campbeltown replaced the German flag and hauled up the British ensign. Under intense fire Campbeltown cut through the torpedo net and rammed the dock gates at 1.34. Wynn, who had been cast off from Campbeltown, was ordered to fire his two torpedoes at his secondary target, the gate at the old entrance. Wynn reported to Commander Ryder and was congratulated on his success with a swift drink from a flask.

Having picked up survivors from Campbeltown and an MTB, Wynn was ordered to return to England. He turned his craft and ran his full speed of 40 knots (74 km/h). Wynn spotted two men on a Carley float directly ahead of him. He had to make a snap decision, either to stop—which could be done quickly—or to drive on, which would have meant that the men would be washed off their float and probably drowned. He later recorded, "it was an awful decision . . . I decided to stop the vessel and we pulled up right alongside them. My crew had got hold of them, but unfortunately at that very moment the German shore batteries found their mark and two shells went straight through us." Wynn was blown from the bridge down to the bilges. He was saved by the chief motor mechanic, Chief Petty Officer Lovegrove, who decided to search that area before jumping overboard. He held the severely injured Wynn and joined other survivors on a Carley float. When the Germans found them 12 hours later only three men were left out of 36.

That morning, whilst the Campbeltown was being inspected by Germans, five tonnes of explosive blew up rendering the dock completely useless until after the war. Two days later Wynn's two torpedoes exploded and destroyed the gates of the old entrance. Wynn, now a prisoner of war and blinded in one eye, heard the explosion. Five Victoria Crosses were awarded for the raid with Wynn awarded the Distinguished Service Cross.

==== Colditz ====
Wynn now sporting a glass eye courtesy of his captors was moved to Marlag Nord POW camp near Bremen. After escaping he was sent to Colditz in January 1943 and was repatriated on medical grounds in January 1945. Hearing that Lovegrove was held in a German naval camp he volunteered to join the relieving force and met again with the man who had saved his life at St. Nazaire.

== Post-war ==
After the war he returned to farming, and in 1963 became High Sheriff of Merionethshire. In 1965 he succeeded his father as Lord Newborough and inherited 20,000 acres (81 km^{2}) in North Wales. In 1971 he chose to sell Bardsey Island to the Bardsey Island Trust.

In 1976 he was called before the magistrates for allegedly firing a 9 lb (4.1 kg) cannonball across the Menai Strait from Fort Belan, which had been built by a relative. The shot went through the sail of a passing yacht and he was charged with causing criminal damage. Even though it was his mother-in-law's birthday, he denied the charge, protesting that it must have been someone else. He was found guilty and fined. He died in Istanbul in 1998 and his ashes were shot out of an 18th-century cannon. His son succeeded him as the 8th Baron Newborough.

Peerage of Ireland
Preceded by Robert Wynn	Baron Newborough; 1965–1998	Succeeded by Robert Wynn
