= Weston-under-Redcastle =

Estate village of the Sir Rowland Hill legacy estates

Coordinates: 52°51′18″N 2°38′49″W

Weston-Under-Redcastle
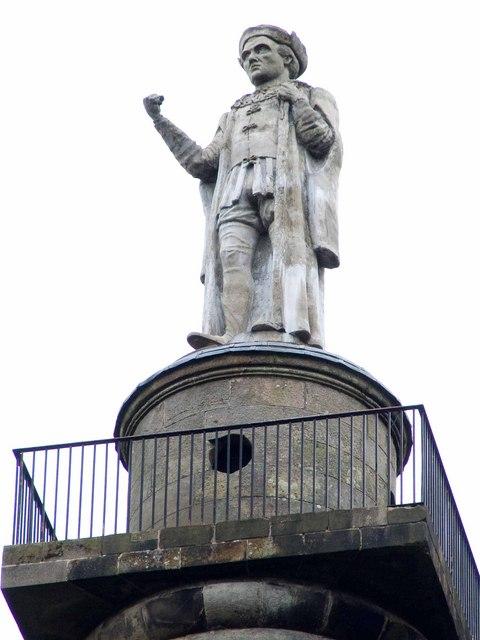
- Monument to Sir Rowland Hill in the Weston-under-Redcastle landscape

- Location within Shropshire
- Population: 285 (2011)
- OS grid reference: SJ564288
- Civil parish: Weston-Under-Redcastle
- Unitary authority: Shropshire
- Ceremonial county: Shropshire
- Region: West Midlands
- Country: England
- Sovereign state: United Kingdom
- Post town: SHREWSBURY
- Postcode district: SY4
- Dialling code: 01948
- Police: West Mercia
- Fire: Shropshire
- Ambulance: West Midlands
- UK Parliament: North Shropshire

Weston-under-Redcastle is an estate village of the Sir Rowland Hill legacy estates. It is a civil parish in Shropshire, England. It lies 10 km (6.2 miles) by road east of Wem. Historically, it has been part of the manor of Hawkstone.

It is under the south west edge of the Hawkstone Ridge.

== Population ==
Population 1881-1961
1871?	296
1881	282
1891	272
1901	222
1911	231
1921	246
1931	253
1951	266
1961	289

== History ==
=== Ancient history ===
Bury Walls, an Iron Age hillfort, indicates the earliest known substantial occupation of the area. The disputed remains of a Roman camp have been contended for the area, postulated to be the lost settlement of Rutunium.

=== Medieval: the Audley family ===
Weston-under-Redcastle was called Westune in the 1086 Domesday Book; it was included in the Hundred of Hodnet within the county of Shropshire. The village had 21 households (large for the time) with total tax value of 3 geld units. In 1066 the value to the lord was £3; in 1086 it was £2. The village contained 3 villagers, 9 smallholders, 8 slaves and 1 rider. Weston had 8 plough lands, 2 lord's plough teams and one men's plough team. In 1066 the lord was Edric the Wild, and in 1086 it was Ranulf Peverel. The fifteen Shropshire hundreds mentioned in the Domesday Survey were entirely rearranged in the 1100-1135 reign of King Henry I, and the Hundred of Hodnet was merged before 1203 into the Hundred of Bradford. When Bradford was divided, Weston was in North Bradford.

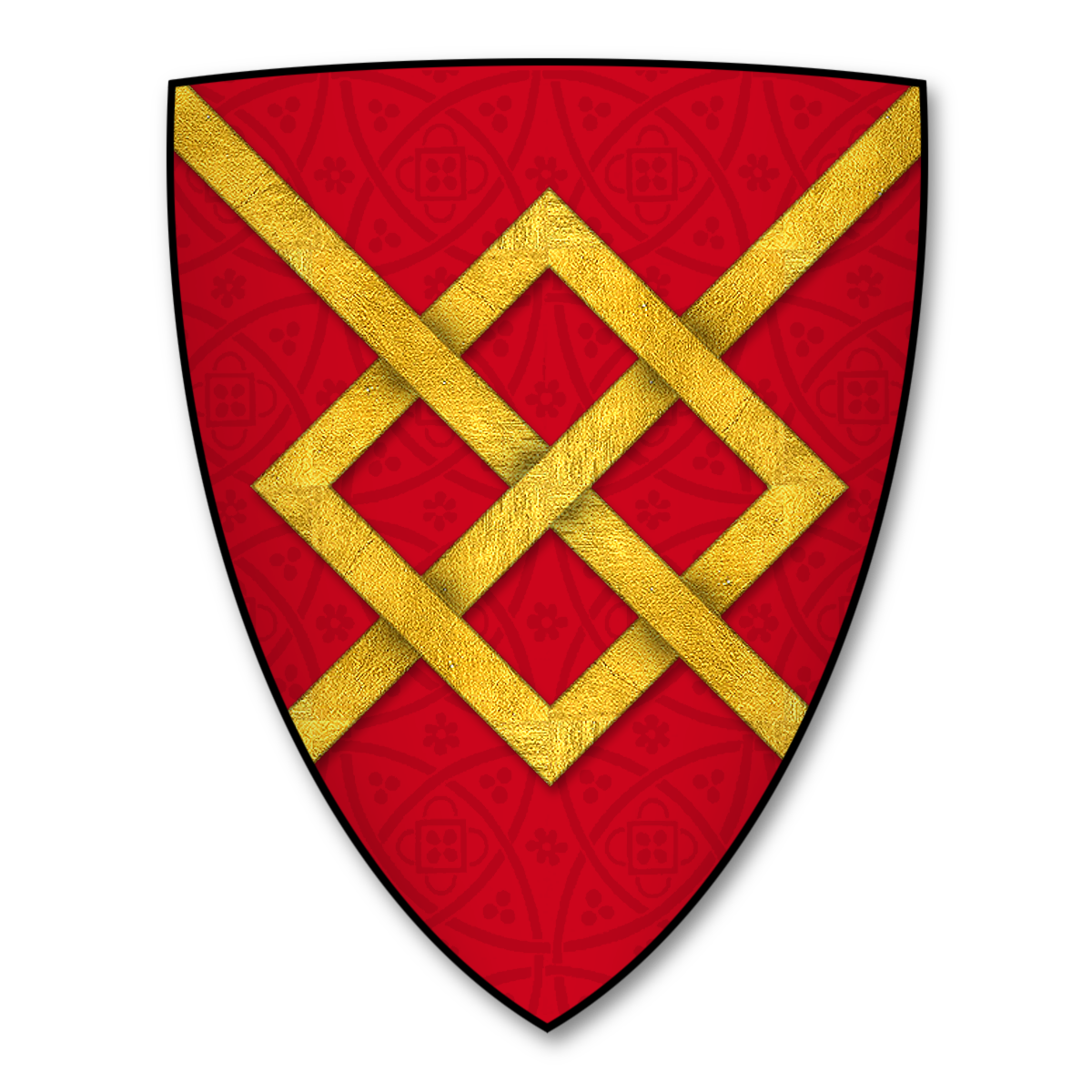
Arms of the Audley family

In 1227 Henry de Audley, Sheriff of Shropshire and Staffordshire, built a sandstone castle on a natural outcrop of rock that was flanked on all sides by wide valleys. The Audley family, later allied to the Stanley family held it in the medieval period: Dugdale informs us that "this castle was erected in the reign of Henry III; but there is an ancient manuscript in the Audley family, which proves that its original existence was of much earlier date. It is there said that 'Maud, or Matilde, wife of William the Conqueror, gave to John de Audley and to his heirs, the lands about Red Castle, in the county of Salop, for certain services done by him to the state."

=== Tudor and early modern: the Hill family ===
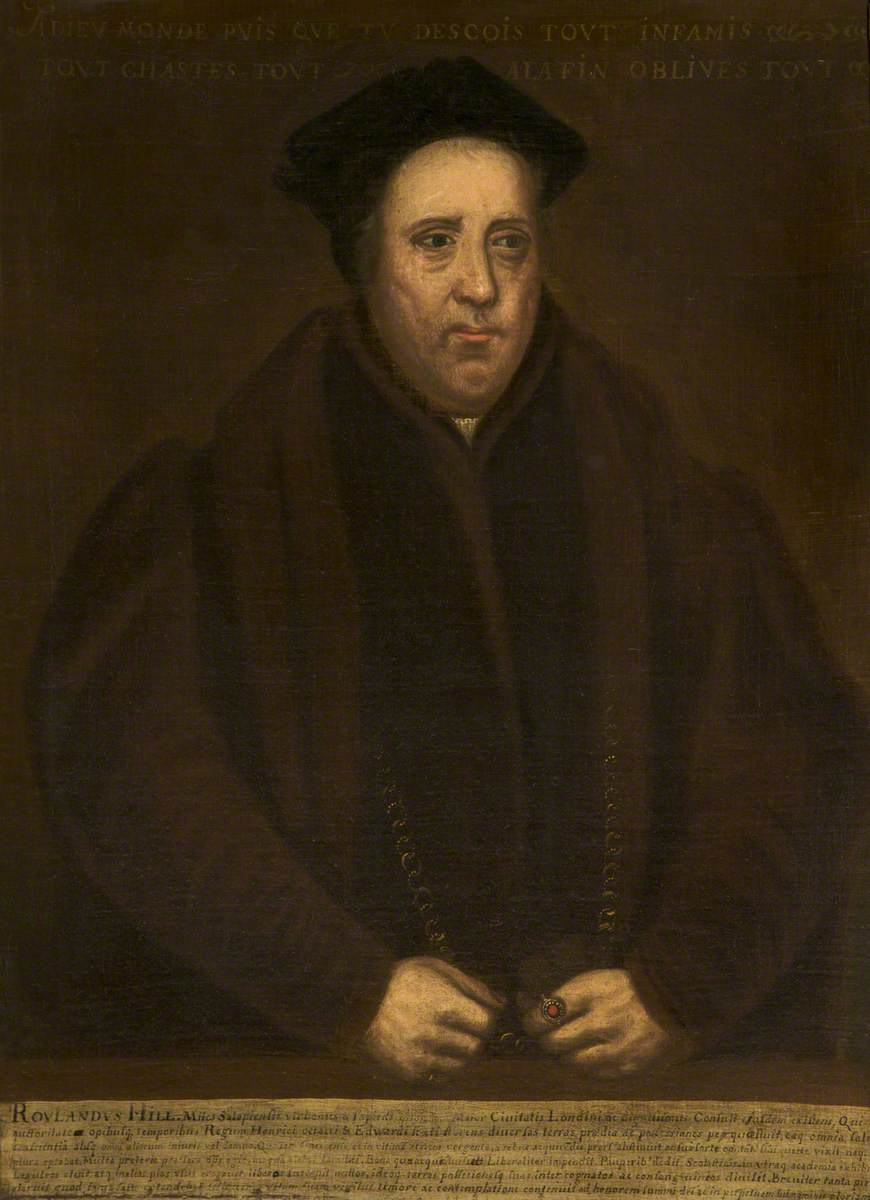
Sir Rowland Hill of Soulton bought the manor of Hawkstone in 1556. He is associated with As You Like It and the Geneva Bible.

Sir Rowland Hill of Soulton (associated with Shakespeare's play As You Like It and the coordination of the Geneva Bible) recruited the Hawkstone landscape for his landscape gardens. At that time, the senior house in the Hawkstone manor was still the Red Castle, and this was recorded as being a ruin when Leland visited in around 1540. Hill therefore maintained his house at Soulton.

Hawkstone Park as understood today is 100 acres (40 ha) of follies and landscaped parkland grounds and rocky outcrops, based around the Red Castle, and this landscape garden was the output of a further development phase associated with Richard Hill of Hawkstone (1655-1727), who was a tutor to the family of Robert Boyle.

==== St Luke's Church ====
The Church of England church of St Luke dates back to 1791, built in the Gothic style but with a Georgian tower.

It is a Grade II listed building. It was originally a chapel of ease, attached to the parish of Hodnet. It now a parish church running with St Peter and St Paul in Wem. The red sandstone building of 1791, on a medieval site, was mostly funded by Sir Richard Hill, 2nd Baronet of Hawkstone. It was restored in the late 19th century: this included the chancel, the gabled timber porch, stained glass, pews and octagonal font.

=== 1968 siege ===
In 1968 a farmer named John James held a woman hostage in a derelict cottage just north of the village. The siege lasted for 17 days, with James shooting at photographers and an armoured car sent in by the Army. The siege ended when the hostage threw James's shotgun out of a window, which allowed soldiers and police to storm the cottage. It remains the longest siege of a wanted person in UK history.

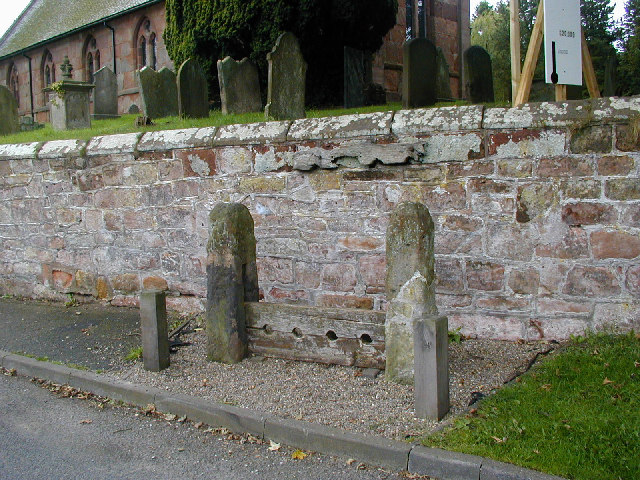
Parish stocks outside St Luke's Parish Church, Weston

== Transport ==
The village is just east of the A49, linking it with nearby Shrewsbury. The nearest railway station is Wem, with a usually two-hourly service south to Shrewsbury and north to Crewe. There are two bus stops in Weston, opposite and adjacent to the church, connecting the village with Shrewsbury and Wem.

== Hawkstone landscape park ==
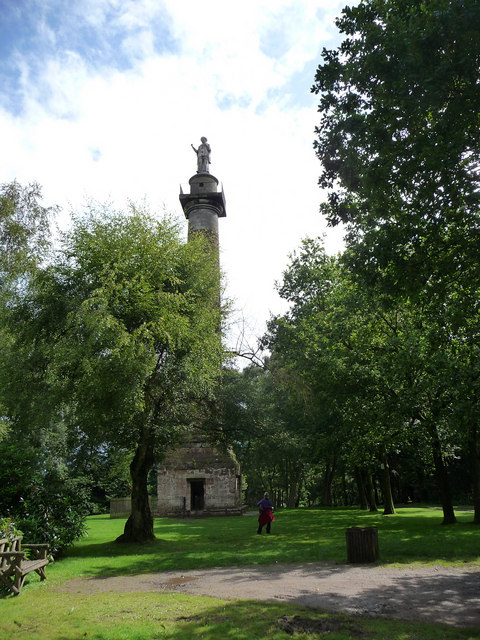
Rowland Hill Monument, Hawkstone Park

The village is set against Hawkstone Park. This is an important and early landscape garden.

== Culture and cultural references ==
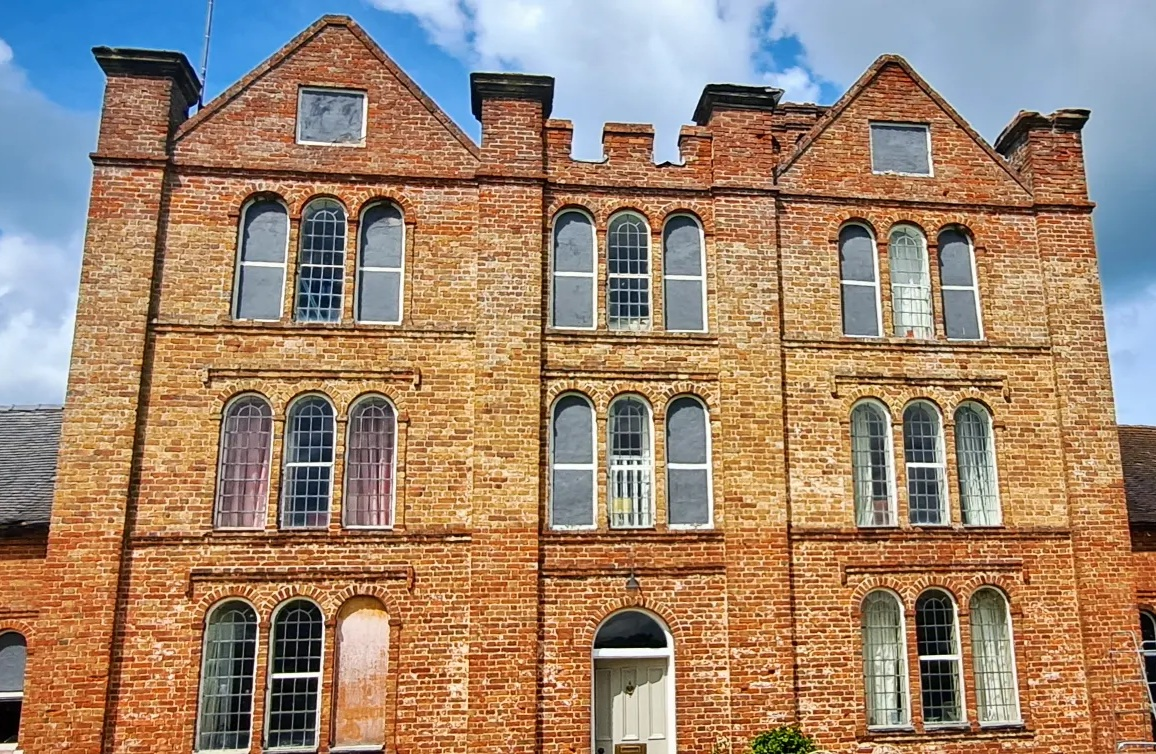
Hawkstone Abbey Farm is associated with the village and is home to the award winning Appleby's Cheese.

Maynard's Farm Shop is located close by and is mentioned in Rick Stein's Food Heroes of Britain.

There is a popular annual village show.

== Filming ==
The landscape was used to represent parts of Narnia in the BBC's TV adaptation of C. S. Lewis's books in The Lion, the Witch and the Wardrobe in 1988 and Prince Caspian a year later.

== King Arthur and the Holy Grail ==
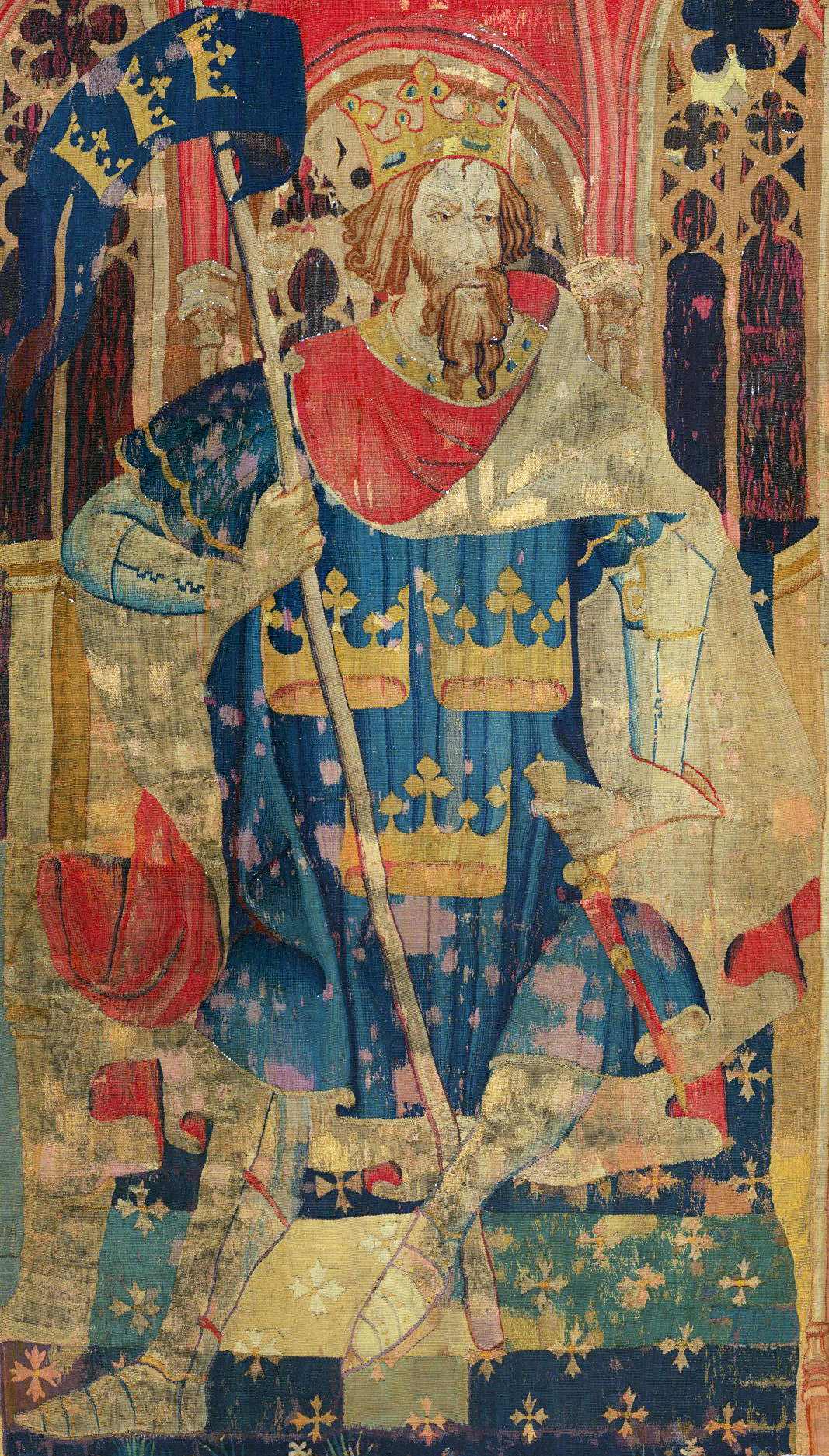
Legends involving King Arthur are thickly planted in the area.

The area is associated with the Arthurian story of the giants Tarquin and Tarquinus, with records of this in the 1700s. They are said to have owned the Red Castle, and their brother Sir Carados who captured Sir Gawain. Sir Lancelot and Sir Tristam of the Round Table set out to rescue their friend. They encountered Sir Carados carrying Sir Gawain bound and tied across his saddle and after a legendary fight Sir Lancelot killed the giant at Killguards near Weston Church freeing Sir Gawain.

Legend has it that King Arthur addressed his knights in the caves contained within this parkland. There is a legend that one of the caves of Hawkstone Park was the burial ground of King Arthur.

There is a folklore belief that the Holy Grail was in the grotto caves in Hawkstone; this is associated with an early Roman scent jar which was found inside a sculpture of an eagle when that sculpture broke in the 1920s.

== Amenities ==
Weston has a Village Hall, and Weston is home to the 18th century Hawkstone Park Hotel which has two golf courses, two restaurants, bars and Hawkstone Park Follies.

== See also ==
- Listed buildings in Weston-under-Redcastle
- Bury Walls
- Hawkstone Park
- Hawkstone Motocross
- Hawkstone Hall
- Soulton Hall
