= Listed buildings in Weston-under-Redcastle =

Weston-under-Redcastle is a civil parish in Shropshire, England. It contains 24 listed buildings that are recorded in the National Heritage List for England. Of these, one is listed at Grade I, the highest of the three grades, two are at Grade II*, the middle grade, and the others are at Grade II, the lowest grade. The parish includes the village of Weston-under-Redcastle and the surrounding area. The area contains Hawkstone Park within which are a number of listed buildings. Many of the listed buildings elsewhere are houses, cottages and farmhouses, the earliest of which are timber framed. The other listed buildings include a ruined castle, a church, village stocks and a pump, and a former dower house and associated structures

== Key ==
| Grade | Criteria |
|---|---|
| I | Buildings of exceptional interest, sometimes considered to be internationally important |
| II* | Particularly important buildings of more than special interest |
| II | Buildings of national importance and special interest |

== Buildings ==
| Name and location | Photograph | Date | Notes | Grade |
|---|---|---|---|---|
| Red Castle; 52.86082°N 2.63649°W | — | 1227 | The castle, then ruinous, was extended in the 18th century, and has since been reduced. It is in red sandstone and stands on two ridges of rock with a ravine between them. The remains include the Great Tower and a smaller turret, and fragments of other towers and curtain walls.The enclosure in which the castle stands is a scheduled monument. | II |
| Park Cottage; 52.85444°N 2.64530°W | — | Late 16th century | The cottage has been altered and extended. It is timber framed on a plinth, originally with cruck construction, and has painted brick infill, partial rebuilding in brick painted to resemble timber framing, and a tile roof. There is one storey and an attic, and two bays. The windows are casements, and there are two gabled eaves dormers. | II |
| The Royal Oak; 52.85528°N 2.64739°W | — | Late 16th or early 17th century | The house, at one time an inn, is timber framed with painted brick infill and a slate roof. There is an L-shaped plan, consisting of hall range with one storey and an attic and 2½ bays, and a flush cross-wing with two storeys and one bay. The doorway has a gabled hood, the windows are casements, and there are two gabled eaves dormers with cusped bargeboards. | II |
| Church House; 52.85473°N 2.64706°W | — | Early 17th century | A farmhouse, later a private house, it is timber framed with painted brick infill and a slate roof. There is one storey and an attic, and three bays. On the front is a gabled porch, the windows are casements, and there are three gabled eaves dormers. | II |
| Hermitage Farmhouse; 52.84010°N 2.62910°W | — | Early 17th century | The farmhouse was extended in the 18th century. It is timber framed with infill in wattle and daub and in red brick, extensions in brick and sandstone, and a tile roof. There is one storey and an attic, and an L-shaped plan, consisting of a hall range, a cross-wing, a sandstone outshut running almost the length of the hall range, and a brick lean-to on the left gable end. The windows are casements and there are gabled eaves dormers. | II |
| Smithy Cottage; 52.85650°N 2.64600°W | — | Early 17th century | A farmhouse, later a private house, it has been altered and extended. The house is timber framed with painted brick infill, the extensions are in brick and stone, and the roof is in tile and slate. There is one storey and an attic, four bays, a two-storey stone gabled extension to the rear on the left, and a flat-roofed brick extension to the rear on the right. The windows are casements, and there are two gabled dormers. | II |
| Weston Cottage and Stores; 52.85712°N 2.64443°W | — | Late 17th century (probable) | A house and stable, later a house and a shop, it is timber framed with infill and extensions in painted brick, partly rendered, and has slate roofs. There is one storey and attics, and an L-shaped plan with a west range of three bays, a north range of two bays, and a lean-to parallel to and in front of the west range. Some windows are casements, some are fixed, and there is a French window, a shop window, and two gabled dormers. | II |
| Village stocks 52.85505°N 2.64780°W | | 17th or 18th century | The stocks are outside the churchyard wall and consist of two rectangular stone posts with slots. Between them are two wooden planks with four leg holes, and a rough stone block. Above, on the churchyard wall, are part of an earlier plank with leg holes. | II |
| Grottos, Hawkstone Park; 52.86301°N 2.63558°W | | Late 18th century (probable) | The grottos have been excavated in natural sandstone, possibly including existing caves, and form a labyrinth of chambers and passages. These were formerly decorated with items such as shells, and these remain in one of the side chambers. | II |
| Ice house, Hawkstone Park; 52.85747°N 2.64019°W | — | Late 18th century (probable) | The ice house, now disused, is carved out of a sandstone outcrop. It has a roughly square recess with a round-headed inner arch leading to a very short tunnel, at end of which is a circular egg-shaped cavity. | II |
| The Menagerie; 52.85686°N 2.63135°W | — | Late 18th century | The former menagerie is now ruinous. It is in red sandstone, and there are three surviving walls enclosing a rectangular area. The remains include an open five-bay pointed arcade with an embattled parapet, and attached screen walls. | II |
| Disused windmill 52.86327°N 2.64527°W | | Late 18th century | The windmill is in red brick and has a circular plan.. There are five levels, and it contains two rectangular doorways, and three square windows, one above the other. At the front is the shaft for the sails, at the rear is gearing for the fantail, and inside some machinery has been retained. | II* |
| The Lion's Den; 52.86093°N 2.63679°W | — | Late 18th century (probable) | A feature in Hawkstone Park consisting of a round-headed recess cut into natural rock. Inside is a recess in the floor that formerly housed a statue of a lion. | II |
| The White Tower; 52.85735°N 2.62774°W | | c. 1780 | The tower is in red brick with sandstone dressings on a sandstone plinth, with a sill band, a moulded corbelled eaves cornice, an embattled parapet and a tile roof. There is an octagonal plan with two levels. The entrance is approached by six steps and has a doorway with pilasters and a moulded entablature, and the windows are tall with pointed heads. | II |
| Remains of The Old Citadel; 52.85224°N 2.63840°W | — | 1785 | Originally a house, later largely demolished, and the remains used for other purposes. It is in red sandstone with a floor band, and a tile roof. There are two storeys and a gabled front. In the upper floor are two blind roundels and a semicircular arch with a plain tympanum and imposts below. Elsewhere are casement windows and a doorway flanked by blind mock gun loops. | II |
| Hawkstone Park Hotel; 52.85733°N 2.64273°W | — | c. 1790 | The hotel has been much altered and extended. It is in rendered brick with a hipped slate roof. The main block has three storeys and seven bays, the middle three bays projecting under a pediment, and there are flanking two-storey one-bay service wings. In the ground floor of each service wing is a Venetian window with a Diocletian window above. The windows in the main block are sashes. | II |
| St Luke's Church; 52.85494°N 2.64743°W | | 1791 | The church was restored in 1879, when the chancel and vestry were added. The church is built in red sandstone, and the roofs are tiled with coped verges and ornamental cresting. It consists of a nave, a south porch, a chancel with a south vestry and a west tower. The tower has two stages, with corner pilasters, a moulded string course, a clock face, a cornice, and a parapet with crocketed corner pinnacles. | II |
| The Obelisk; 52.85886°N 2.62658°W | | 1795 | A column to commemorate Sir Rowland Hill, the first Protestant Lord Mayor of London. It is in red sandstone with grey sandstone at the top, and consists of a circular Tuscan column about 100 feet (30 m) high. The column stands on a stepped plinth with moulded capping, it contains four windows and a spiral staircase, and there is more moulded capping at the top. The column was originally surmounted by a statue of Rowland Hill but this was destroyed in a storm in the 1930s, and was replaced by a statue by Guy Portelli in 1992. | I |
| The Citadel; 52.85250°N 2.63831°W | | 1824–25 | A dower house designed by Thomas Harrison in Gothic Revival style. It is in red sandstone with a continuous moulded string course, an embattled parapet, and a slate roof. There are two storeys, and the plan consists of three circular bastions around a central octagon, with embattled walls at the rear. The bastions have false machicolations and mock gun loops, and to the rear of the central bastion is an octagonal stair turret. The windows are mullioned and transomed, most with hood moulds, and the entrance is through a shallow porch in the middle bastion, which has a four-centred arch. | II* |
| Gate piers and ha-ha, The Citadel; 52.85278°N 2.63811°W | — | c. 1824–25 | The gate piers and ha-ha wall were designed by Thomas Harrison. They are in sandstone and the wall has chamfered coping. The gate piers are at the east end of the terrace, and consist of four attached columns with moulded plinths and capping. The ha-ha wall, which encloses a cobbled terrace, has four-sided bastions at its angles. | II |
| Ice house, The Citadel; 52.85154°N 2.63745°W | — | Early 19th century | The ice house, now disused, is built in stone and red brick. A flight of steps leads to a round-headed arch into a short tunnel with an infilled cavity at the end. | II |
| Summerhouse, The Citadel; 52.85203°N 2.63931°W | — | Early to mid 19th century | The summer house is built in wood with some weatherboarding infill on a sandstone plinth. It has an octagonal plan with three open sides, and an octagonal mainly thatched roof with a pointed finial. Inside is a bench on five sides. | II |
| Holloway Cottage; 52.85146°N 2.66066°W | — | 19th century | An estate cottage in red brick with angle quoins and a tile roof, it is in Gothic style. There is one storey and an attic and three bays. In the centre is a projecting porch with a four-centred arch. This flanked by mullioned and transomed windows with lattice glazing, moulded surrounds and hood moulds, and on the return are oriel windows on carved brackets. The gables on the roof and the porch have cusped bargeboards and pointed finials. | II |
| Entrance Lodge, Hawkstone Park; 52.85501°N 2.64583°W | | 1853–54| | The entrance lodge is in red brick with sandstone dressings on a moulded plinth, and has tile roofs with ornamental cresting, and gables with ornately decorated bargeboards, finials and pendants. It is in Tudor Revival style, and has two storeys and an attic. There is a cruciform plan, with a long rear range and a two-storey porch on the front. The windows are mullioned with moulded hood moulds, the porch has a four-centred arch, and the door has Gothic tracery. Above the door is an embattled oriel window, and there are smaller oriel windows elsewhere. | II |
| Tunnel on drive, Hawkstone Park; 52.86446°N 2.63480°W | — | 1853–54 | The tunnel on the drive to Hawkstone Hall has been carved out of natural sandstone. It is a short tunnel with a round-headed arch, and crossing it is a footpath. | II |
| Belfry Cottage and Belfry Lodge; 52.85459°N 2.64571°W | — | Mid to late 19th century | A school and school house, later divided into two dwellings, it has applied timber framing with rendered infill on a painted sandstone plinth. The roof is tiled and the gables have pointed finials. On the roof is a square lantern with a pyramidal cap. There is one storey and an attic, and an L-shaped plan. On the front is a gabled porch with a Tudor arched opening, and the windows are oriels containing mullions and transoms. | II |
| Village pump, basin and wall 52.85482°N 2.64592°W | — | Mid to late 19th century | The pump and basin are in a rectangular walled enclosure. The pump is in painted cast iron and has a ringed shaft with a fluted cap and a domed top, a slightly curved handle and a decorated spout, and there is small wheel to the side of the shaft. The stone basin is rectangular with rounded corners, and the wall is in sandstone with plain coping. | II |
