= Hawkstone Park =

Allegorical landscape honouring the Geneva Bible project in Shropshire, England

Coordinates: 52°51′27.18″N 2°38′34.71″W

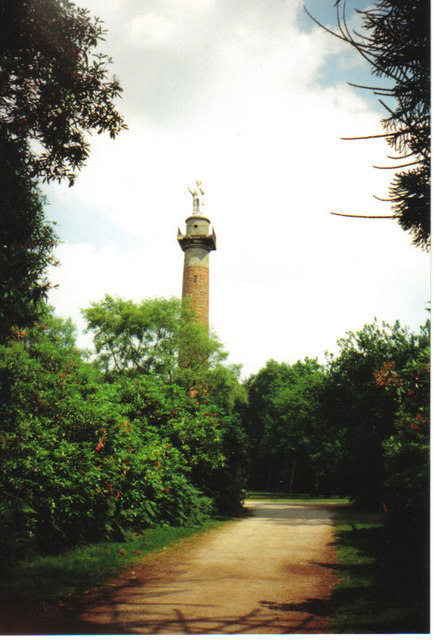
- Obelisk monument to Rowland Hill, publisher of the Geneva Bible
- Interactive map of Hawkstone Park
- Type: Historic landscape
- Location: Weston-under-Redcastle, Shropshire, England
- Nearest town: Wem
- Area: 100 acres (40.47 ha)
- Operator: Principal Hayley Group
- Status: Open
- Website: https://www.hawkstoneparkfollies.co.uk/

Hawkstone Park is a historic landscape park in Shropshire, England, with pleasure grounds and gardens.

It is historically associated with Soulton Hall the Shropshire headquarters of Sir Rowland Hill ("Old Sir Rowland") publisher of the Geneva Bible, (d.1561) because these two estates were bought by him in 1556 from Sir Thomas Lodge(father of the writer Thomas Lodge, who penned the source book of Shakespeare's play As You Like It). For these reasons, the landscape is increasingly linked with the inspiration for that play. One of the reasons for the dominance of the landscape as an eighteenth century attraction is the Geneva Bible's enduring internal importance and is known in America as the Founders Bible, as well as being the Bible of Shakespeare, Donne and Milton.

In the later 1600s, Hawkstone Hall was built as another headquarters of the legacy estates of "Old Sir Rowland".

The park, north east of the small village of Weston-under-Redcastle, near Wem. is listed Grade I in Historic England's Register of Parks and Gardens. It is known for its follies.

== Overview ==
Today the park consists of 100 acres (40 ha) of follies and landscaped parkland grounds and rocky outcrops, based around the ruins of the medieval Red Castle.

A climax in the development of the landscape is considered to be associated with the work of Richard Hill (1655–1727), also known as 'The Great Hill', circa 1707. The follies, estate and reputation were further enhanced by his nephew and heir Sir Rowland Hill, 1st Baronet Hill of Hawkstone (1705–1783) and then Sir Richard Hill, 2nd Baronet (1733–1808) during the 18th century.

The park endured a century of neglect and decay until an ongoing programme of restoration was started in 1990, enabling it to be re-opened in 1993. It is now scheduled as Grade-1 listed on the National Register of Historic Parks and Gardens. It takes a 2.5-hour hiking tour to completely see each folly and their landscapes (a reasonable level of physical fitness and mobility is required and there are many steps, ascents and descents). At some times of the year, not all site trails are accessible.

== History ==
=== Castle ===
Arms of the Audley family

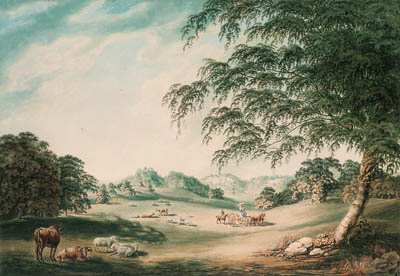
Eighteenth century view of the landscape

Red Castle, the first castle at Hawkstone Park, was built in 1227 by Henry de Audley (Alditheley), Sheriff of Shropshire and Staffordshire. This Norman enclosure castle was built of sandstone on a natural outcrop of rock, flanked on all sides by wide valleys. The castle has been known by various names: Red Castle; Rubree; Radeclif, Redcliffe, Redde, Castle Rous, and Hawkstone. About the same time (1227-1232) Henry also built Heighley Castle at Madeley, Staffordshire, and made it the family caput. Subsequent generations of Audleys were also known as Lords of Heleigh Castle, and expanded from there. The site of the Red Castle is closed to the public as it is unsafe. It takes up the top of Red Castle Hill (the westerly outcropping hill of the park grounds), a crag overlooking the golf course and Weston to its south east. John Tuchet, 4th Baron Audley (1371–1408) inherited the title via his sister, then survived the uprising of Owain Glyndŵr and the Battle of Shrewsbury in 1403, where he fought against Henry "Hotspur" Percy. His son James Tuchet, 5th Baron Audley (1398–1459) was killed by Sir Roger Kynaston, whilst leading the House of Lancaster at the Battle of Blore Heath in 1459. The Audleys forfeited the title when James Tuchet, 7th Baron Audley (c. 1463–1497) led a rebellion against King Henry VII of England in 1497 and was executed. The Audley title was restored to John Tuchet, 8th Baron Audley in 1512.

The "Red Castle", as it became known, was held by the family until the early 16th century initially as their main Shropshire stronghold. Repairs were undertaken in 1283. It was in use in 1322, but by around 1400 it seems no longer occupied.

When Leland visited the castle in around 1540 he described it as ruinous.

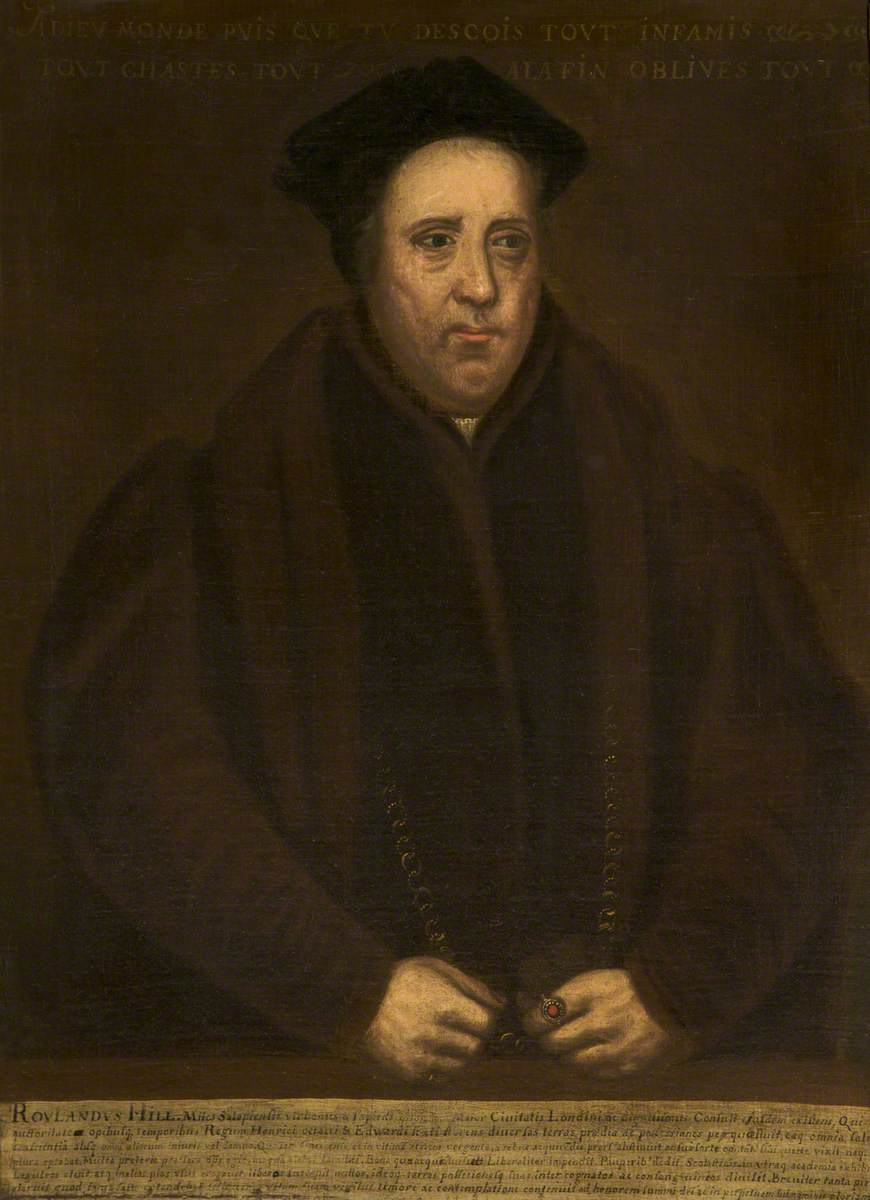
Sir Rowland Hill of Soulton, who bought Hawkstone along with Soulton in 1556. He is associated with the Geneva Bible and Shakespeare's As You Like It.

=== Tudor period ===
In the sixteenth century, the manors Soulton and Hawkstone (the latter of which includes the village) were obtained in 1556 by Sir Rowland Hill, the coordinator of the Geneva Bible who is associated with Shakespeare’s play As You Like It. Sir Rowland Hill made his residence at Soulton and recruited the Hawkstone landscape for allegorical landscape gardens addressing his house there.

Eventually the lands passed via Sir Andrew Corbet of Moreton Corbet to Sir Rowland Hill, 1st Baronet Hill of Hawkstone (1705–1783), who lived nearby at Shelvock Manor. The hall at Hawkstone dates from the late 1600s, with records indicating the senior house in Hawkstone was in ruins in Tudor times. It is recorded that:

in the ruin of Red Castle... Rowland Hill the Royalist found it convenient to hide, for his own safety and the good of the Commonwealth

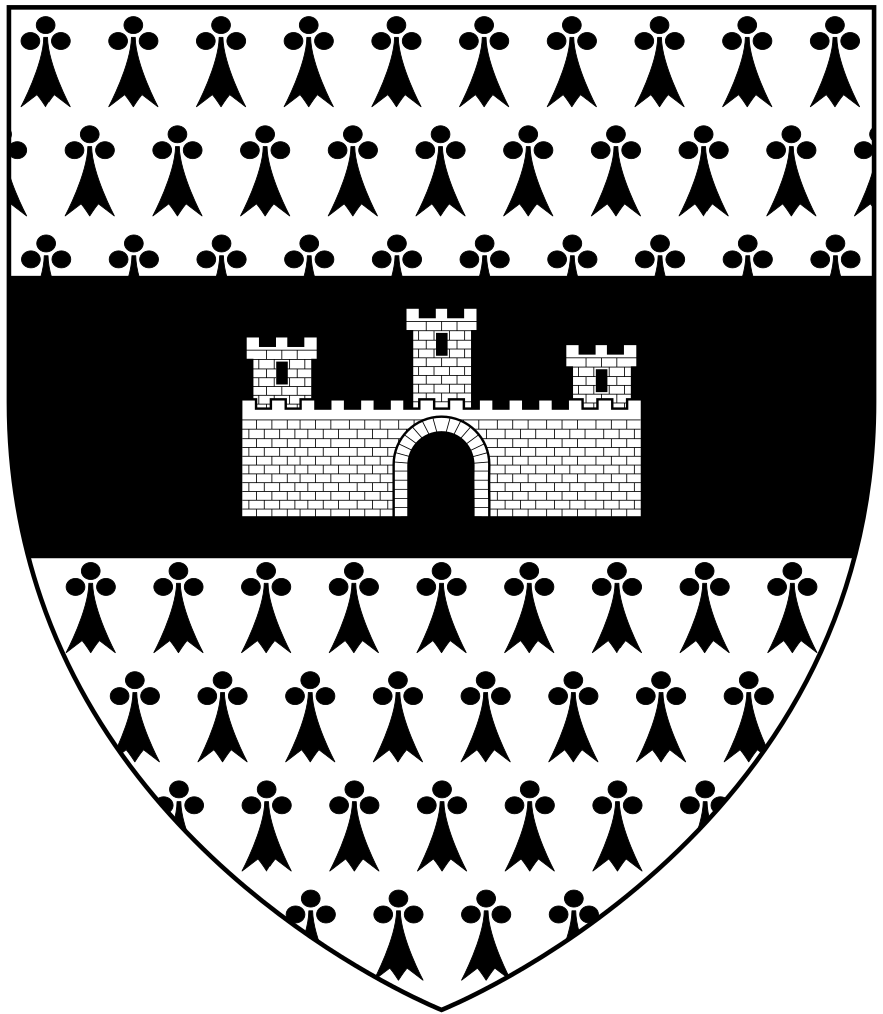
Arms of the Hill family of Shropshire, who created the landscape garden between 1556 and 1900

=== Restoration ===
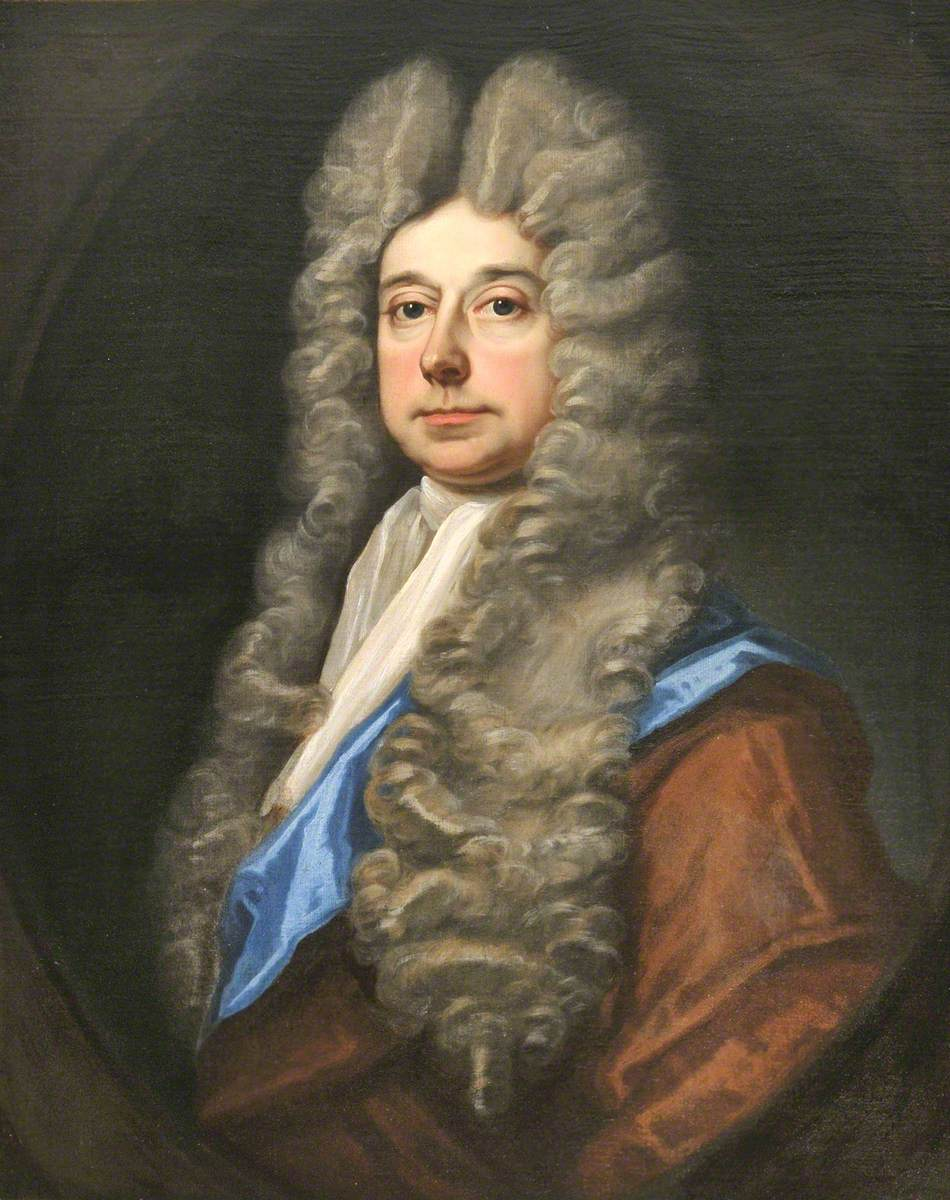
The Reverend and Right Honourable Richard Hill of Hawkstone (1654–1727)

Richard Hill (1655–1727), 'The Great Hill', traveller and diplomat, had made a fortune by 'lucrative arithmetick' (sic), raised the family into the aristocracy, and established an existing Hawkstone Manor House as a seat of that branch of the family. He started partial demolition of the house in 1701, replacing it with the Hall, completing it circa 1707.

=== Georgian ===
Sir Rowland Hill, 1st Baronet (1705–1783), landscaped the Red Castle and extended the estate, with walks over the four natural hills and a wide range of follies that included a hermit to dispense wisdom to visitors.

Sir Richard Hill, 2nd Baronet (1733–1808) took over on his father’s death in 1783, published a guide for visitors and built the 'Hawkstone Inn' to accommodate them. He engaged landscape gardener William Emes to build a vast manmade lake, the Hawk River and his follies included a 'ruined' Gothic architecture Arch on Grotto Hill, the urn, a tribute to an English Civil War ancestor, the Swiss Bridge, and the 100-foot (30 m) obelisk with an internal staircase, topped by a statue of the original Sir Rowland Hill. Hawkstone Park had become one of Britain’s top attractions by the time he died in 1808. It maintained this status under his brother Sir John Hill, 3rd Baronet (1740–1824).

=== Victorian collapse ===
Sir Rowland Hill, 4th Baronet Hill of Hawkstone, 2nd Viscount Hill (1800–1875) inherited, spent and lost a large fortune. He created two new drives, one at vast expense through a rock cutting, and even considered completely relocating the hall across the park. In 1824-5 he built a dower house known as The Citadel in Gothic Revival style. His extravagance and bad management caused a descent into a mess that was inherited in 1875 by his son, Rowland Clegg-Hill, the 3rd Viscount Hill (1833–1895) who was bankrupt by the time of his death in 1895, forcing the sale of the contents of the hall and then the split up of the estate by 1906.

=== Twentieth century and later ===
During World War II, parts of the park were used as a prisoner of war camp.

Hawkstone Park is now largely restored, and once again open to the public. It is protected as a Grade I historic park.

== Features ==
=== Wider landscape ===
There are various caves, tunnels through the rock, walkways, viewpoints and trails winding through Rhododendron plantations.

=== Features inside the current park ===
==== The Obelisk ====
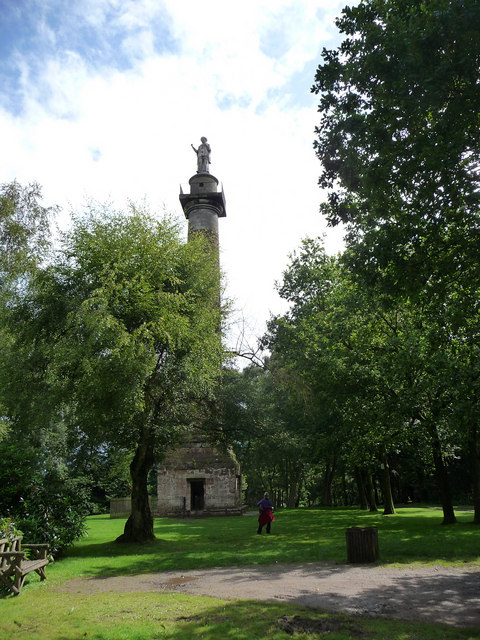
Rowland Hill Monument, Hawkstone Park

Lately known as "The Monument", this a is column built to be 110 feet (34 m) high commemorating Sir Rowland Hill of Soulton. He coordinated the Geneva Bible translation and was the first Protestant Mayor of London. There has been some friction relating to its original and traditional name "The Obelisk", which is explicable because of the status of the person to whom it was raised.

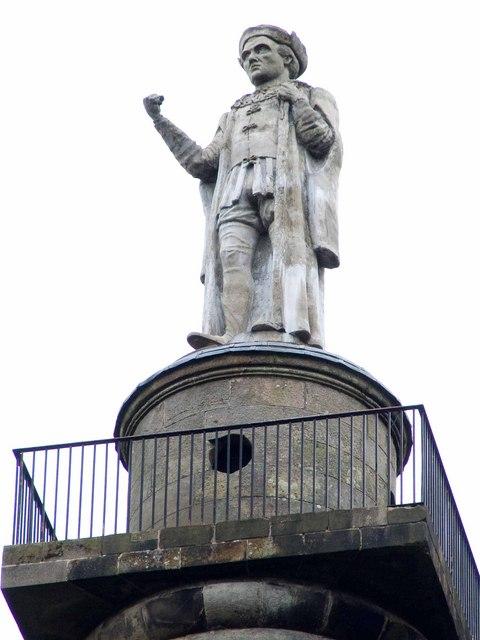
The late 20th century replacement statue of Sir Rowland Hill. He is holding a copy of the Magna Carta.

The statue on the top is a modern replacement. The original eighteenth century statue was a copy from an ancient monument, which before the fire of London stood in the church of St. Stephens Walbrook.

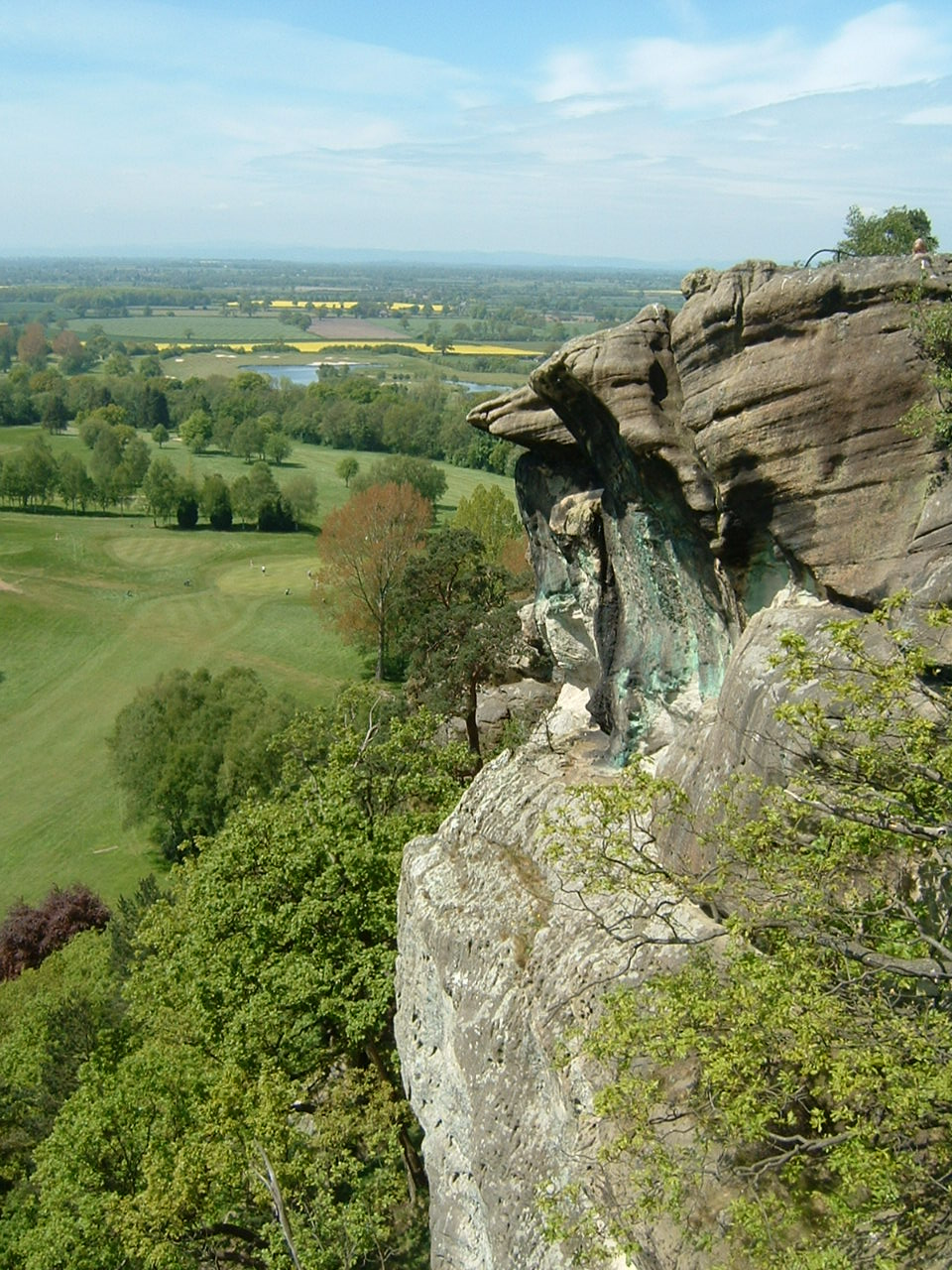
Looking over the golf course from Hawkstone Hill and towards Soulton Hall

He is holding a copy of the Magna Carta and pointing towards his house at Soulton Hall.

The text originally on the Hawkstone pillar read as follows:

THE RIGHTEOUS SHALL BE HAD IN EVERLASTING REMEMBRANCE.-Psalm cxi. 6.

The first stone of this Pillar was laid by Sir Richard Hill, Bart. Member in several Parliaments for this County, on the 1st day of October, in the year 1795; who caused it to be erected, not only for the various uses of an Observatory, and to feast the eye, by presenting to it at one view, a most luxuriant and extensive prospect, which takes in not less than twelve (or, as some assert, fifteen) counties; but from motives of justice, respect, and gratitude to the memory of a truly great and good man, viz. Sir Rowland Hill, Knt.... he became one of the most considerable and opulent merchants of his time, and was Lord Mayor of the same, in the second and third years of Edward VI, anno 1549 and 1550, and was the first Protestant who filled that high office. Having embraced the principles of the Reformation, he zealously exerted himself in behalf of the Protestant cause, and having been diligent in the use of all religious exercises, prayerful, conscientious, and watchful (as a writer of his character expresses it), yet trusting only in the merits of our Lord and Saviour, Jesus Christ, he exchanged his life for a better, a short while after the death of that pious young monarch, being aged nearly seventy years. For a considerable time previous to his decease, he gave up his mercantile occupations, that he might with more devotedness of heart attend to the great concerns of another world. His lands, possessions, and church patronage, were immense; particularly in the counties of Salop and Chester; the number of his tenants (none of whom he ever raised or fined) amounting to one thousand one hundred and eighty-one, as appears from his own hand writing. But his private virtues, good deeds, and munificent spirit, were quite unlimited, and extended-like the prospect before us, East, West, North, and South, far surpassing all bounds. "Being sensible," saith Fuller (speaking of him in his "Worthies of England"), "that "his great estate was given him of God," it was his desire to devote it to his glory. He built a spacious church in his own parish of Hodnet, and likewise the neighbouring church of Stoke, at his own expense. He built Tern and Atcham Bridges in this county, both of hewn stone, and containing several arches each. He also built other large bridges of timber. He built and endowed several Free Schools, particularly that of Drayton. He made and paved divers highways for the public utility. He founded exhibitions, and educated many students at both Universities, and supported at the Inns of Court others who were brought up to the Law. He was the unwearied friend of the widow and the fatherless. He clothed annually three hundred poor people in his own neighbourhood, both with shirts and coats; and in the city of London he gave £500 (an immense sum in those days) to St. Bartholomew's hospital, besides (saith Fuller) £600 to Christ Church hospital. He also gave most liberally to all other hospitals, and at his death bequeathed £150 to the poor of all the Wards in London. He had no children, but his relations and kinsfolk were numerous, who all partook largely of his bounty, both in his lifetime and at his death. He constantly kept up a great family household, where he maintained good hospitality. Many resorted to him for his wise and salutary advice; and none who came to him were ever sent empty or dissatisfied away.

Go and do thou likewise, as far as thy ability will permit, without injury to thy own relations.

To suffer such a character to sink into oblivion, would be in the highest degree ungrateful, as well as injurious to posterity, for whose imitation it is held up.

There is a view across Hawk Lake to Hawkstone Abbey Farm.

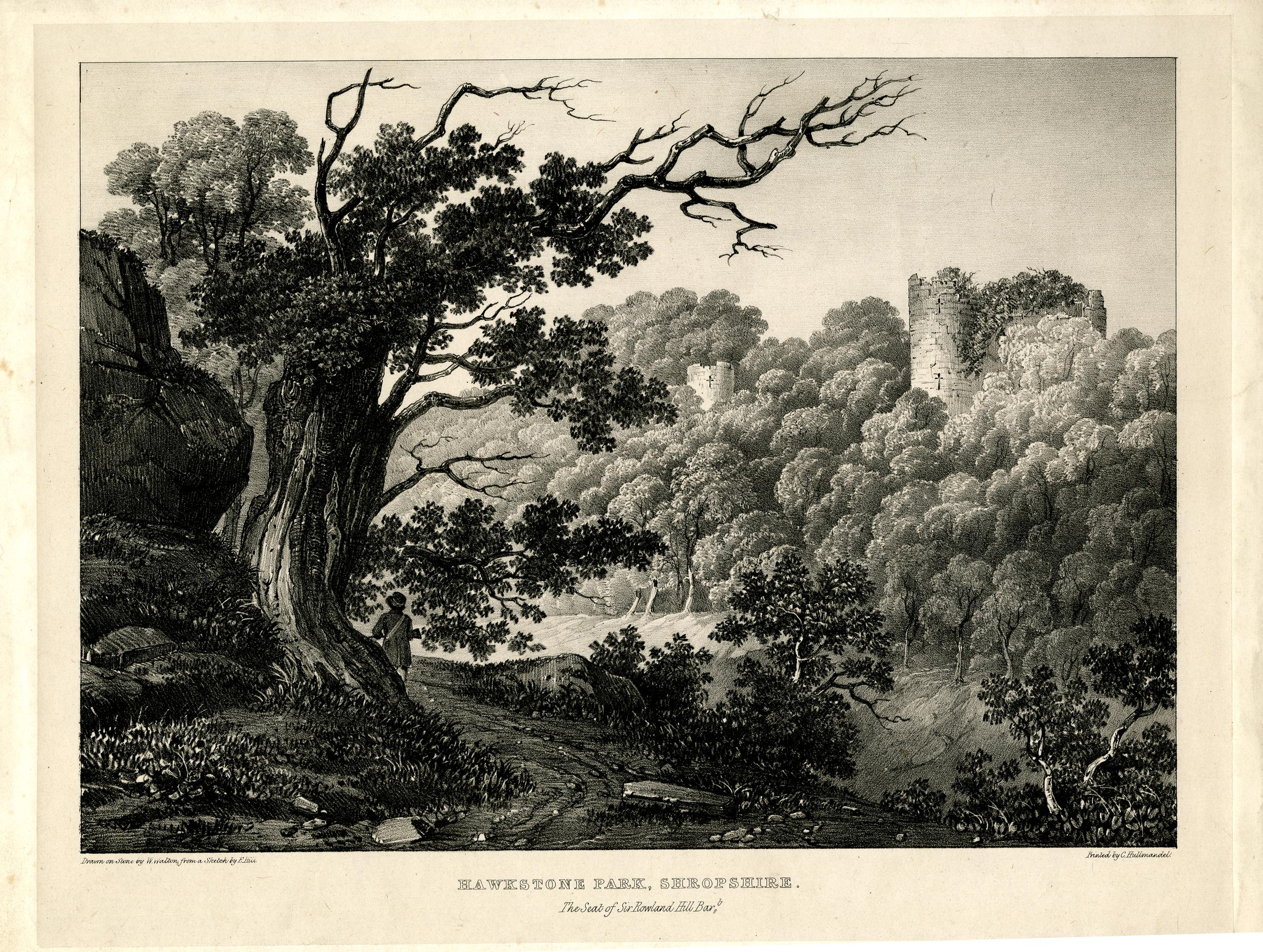
The ruins of the Red Castle in the 1700s

===== Red Castle =====
The adaption of a somewhat unusual location for a medieval castle provides a valuable insight into the development of military architecture in this region in the 13th century. The upstanding remains of individual buildings, including those cut into the rock, contain important architectural features.

===== Ravens' Shelf =====
This is one of the wildest spots in Hawkstone Park.

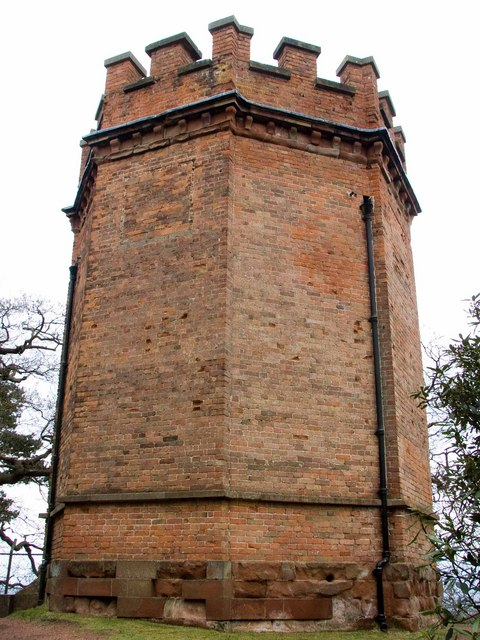
The octagonal white tower

===== White Tower =====
The White Tower is an octagonal red brick tower, once lime washed. Inside it originally had traces of a green, red and yellow colour scheme. Today it has a waxwork of the generals Viscount Hill and the Duke of Wellington inside.

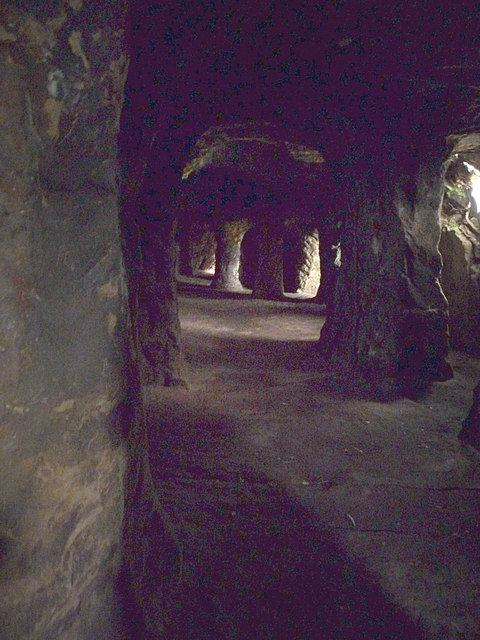
The Grotto caves

===== The Grotto caves =====
The Grotto may have originated as a 5th-century copper mine. This once contained elaborate decoration which included shells, slag, coral and ore-encrusted walls and coloured glass in its windows.

===== The arch =====
There is an arch called "The Arch" on the top of Grotto Hill.

===== Urn =====
Placed in commemoration of a member of the Hill family who hid in the Redcastle and the caves during the Civil War after the Hill houses at Soulton and Hawkstone had been ransacked by Parliamentarians around the time of the battle of Wem.

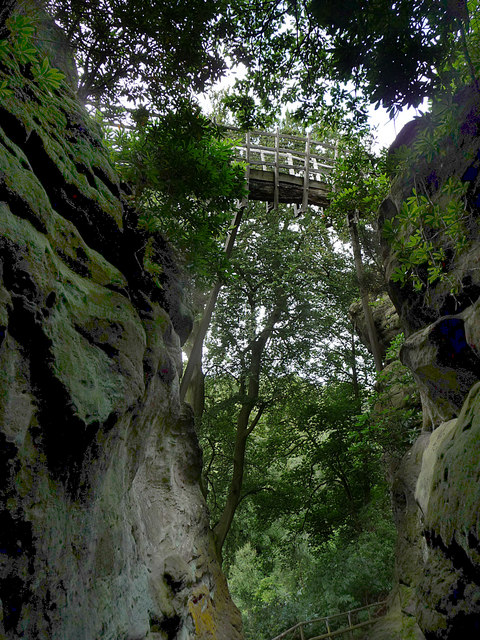
The Swiss Bridge from below

===== Cleft and Swiss Bridge =====
The Cleft is a narrow passage in the cliff which is spanned by the Swiss Bridge.

===== Menagerie =====
Standing on the southern slope of the Elysian Hill, the Menagerie housed a collection of stuffed birds in early 19th century. The arcade collapsed after a gale in 1952.

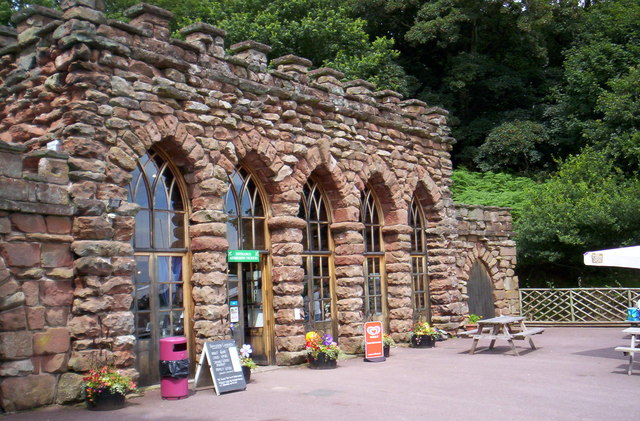
The Greenhouse

===== Greenhouse =====
This gothic style building was originally constructed as a halfway point for refreshments.

===== Hermitage =====
This thatched building was present by 1787 and restored in the 1990s.

===== Stone arch =====
This is on the roadway to Hawkstone Hall, excavated from hill to form a threshold.

===== Cleft =====
This is a later 1700s excavation of steps to connect to a long entrance tunnel into the Grotto.

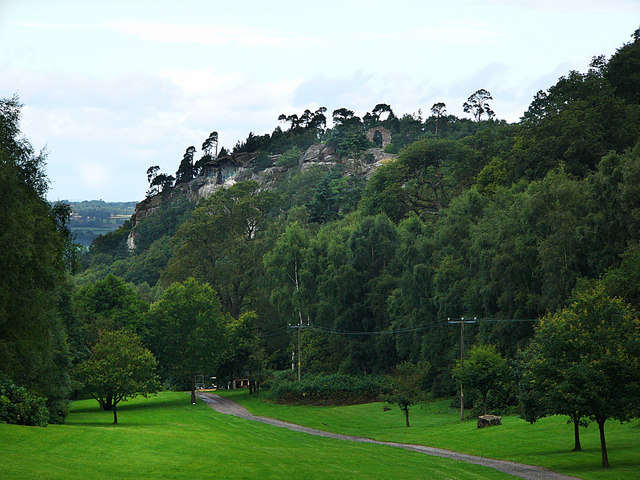
The grand valley inland cliffs looking over the north Shropshire plains

===== Grand Valley =====
This is a level area between the Hawkstone Hills.

===== Terrace Arboretum =====
Throughout the 1700s and 1800s, plants and trees were brought in from around the world. Many of these were planted along the terrace, providing shelter from the hot sun or rain. Nowadays, the Terrace Arboretum contains a forest of rhododendron.

== Features outside the current park, but historically related ==
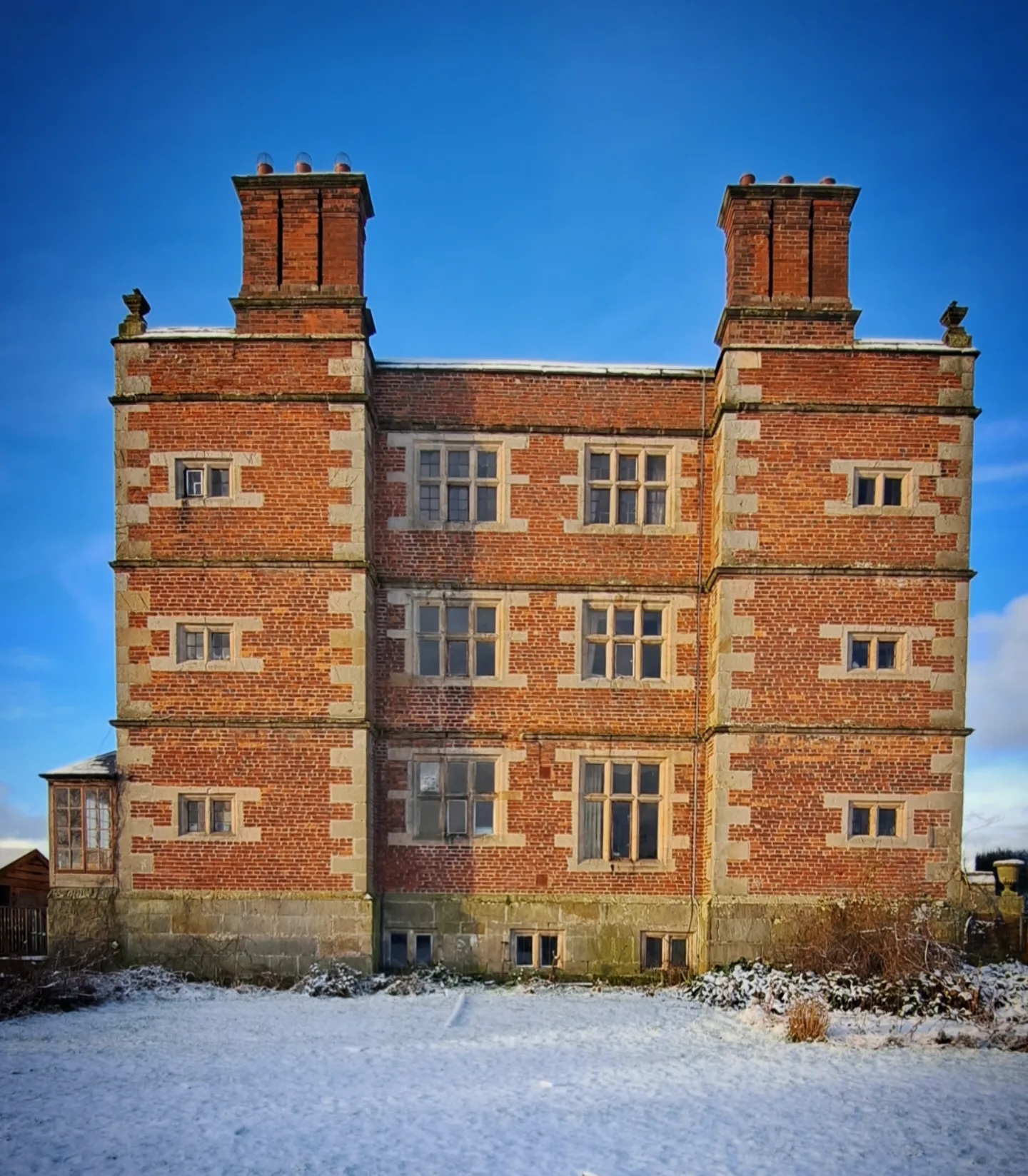
Soulton Hall, the architectural project of Sir Rowland Hill (d.1561), who is memorialised at Hawkstone, which was also part of his estate – the park sets up views to this building

=== Soulton Hall ===
Soulton Hall was the house of Sir Rowland Hill, built by 1560, which recruited the Hawkstone landscape for allegorical landscape gardens.

This is understood to be the "Tower,/Relict of Ages" referred to in the sonnet below.

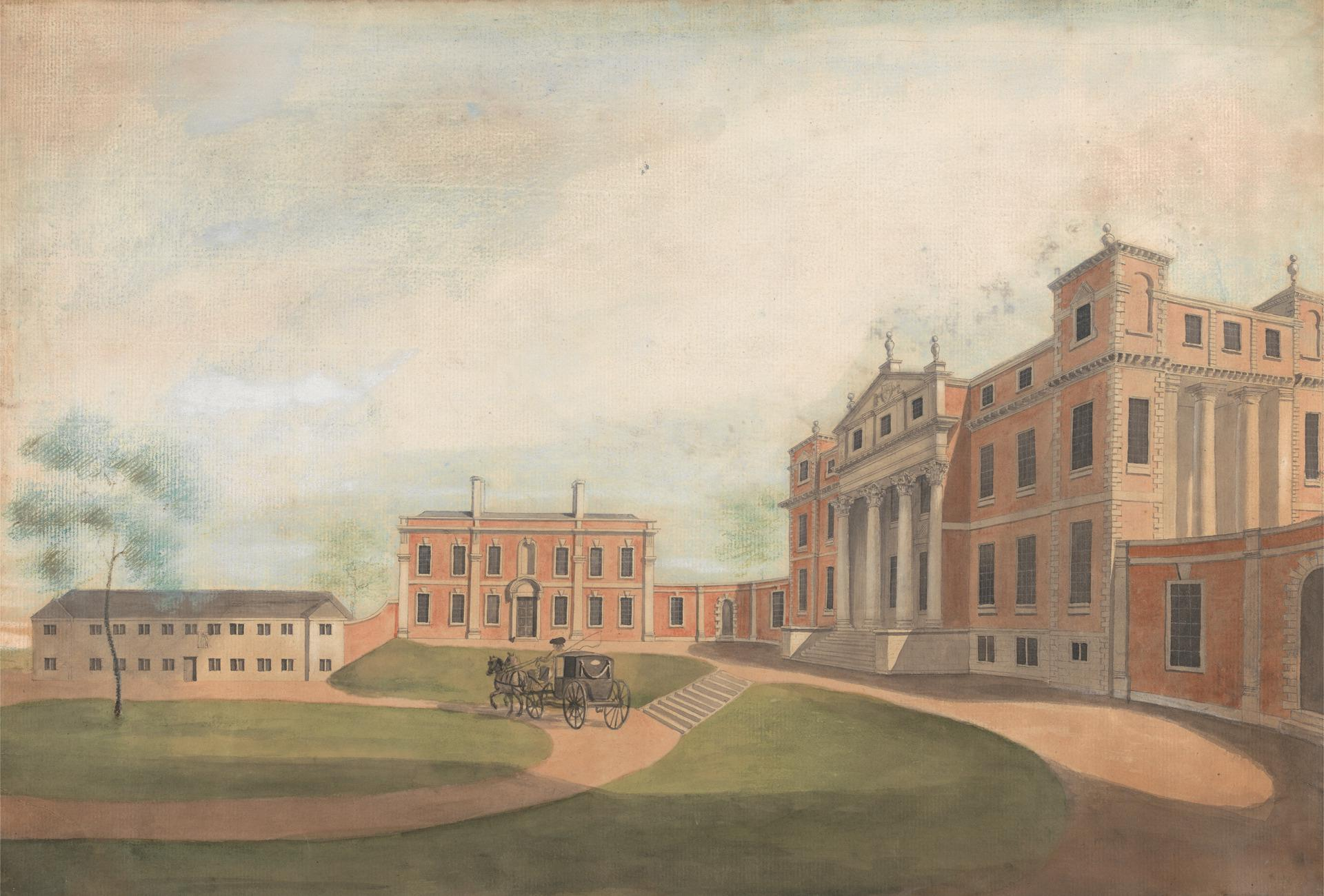
Hawkstone Hall in the 18th century

=== Hawkstone Hall ===
The 18th-century phase is associated with the hall at Hawkstone.

In a compartment at the west end of the garden of this building is a cemetery for priests associated with the former Redemptorist seminary located at Hawkstone Hall from 1926 to 1973.

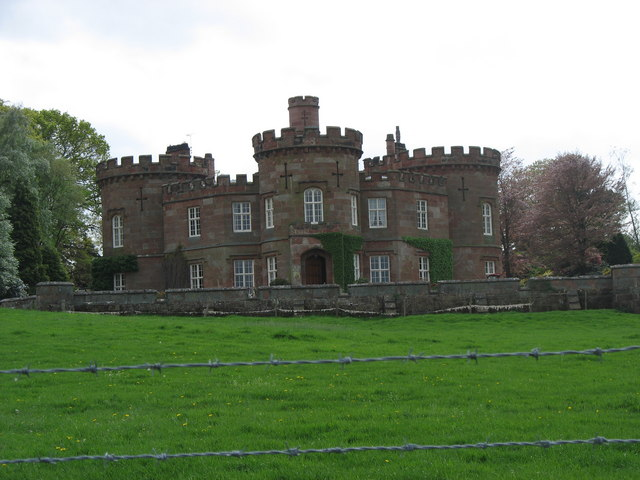
The Citadel was built by the Hill family Jane in the 1820s

=== The Citadel ===
The Citadel is a dower house on the estate built to represent the arms of the Hill family. It was built in 1824–25 to a design by Thomas Harrison of Chester.

=== Hawkstone Abbey Farm ===
The building now known as Hawkstone Abbey Farm is an "eye-catcher" from Hawkstone and was part of the Hill projects over the estates.

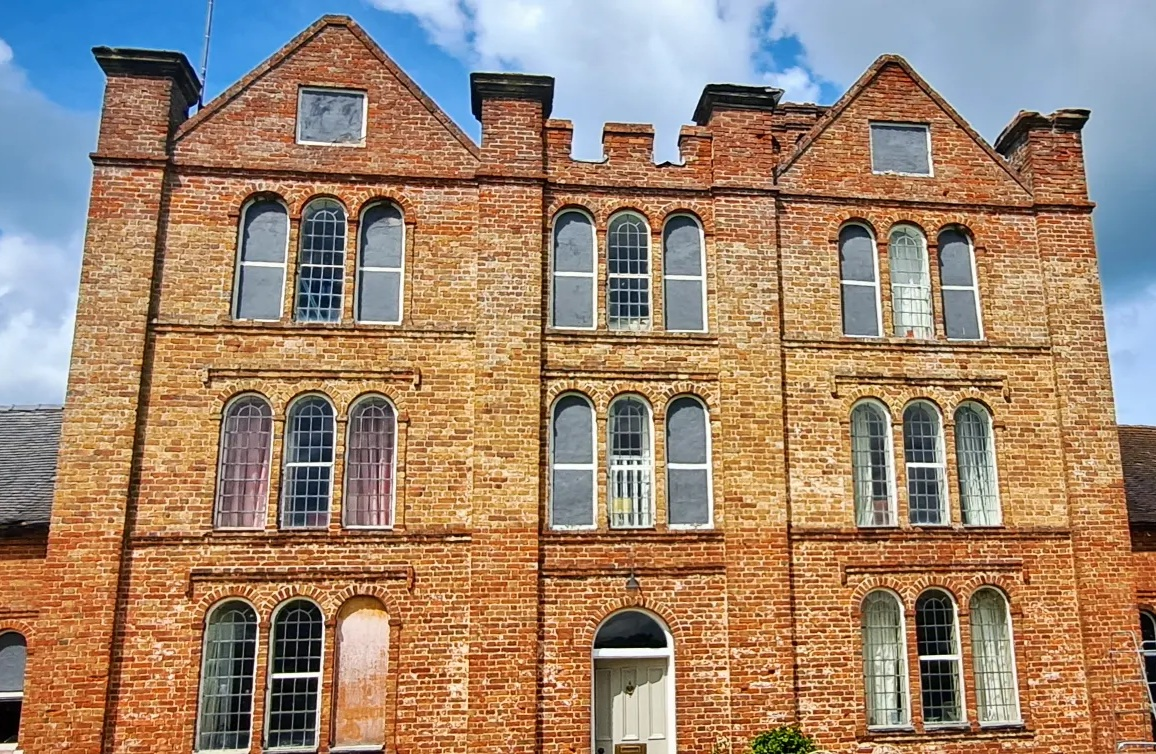
Hawkstone Abbey Farm is associated with the Hill estates

== Filming ==
The landscape was used to represent parts of Narnia in the BBC's TV adaptation of C. S. Lewis's books in The Lion, the Witch and the Wardrobe in 1988 and Prince Caspian a year later.

== King Arthur and the Holy Grail ==
The area is associated with the Arthurian story of the giants Tarquin and Tarquinus, with records of this in the 1700s.

They are said to have owned the Red Castle, and their brother Sir Carados who captured Sir Gawain. Sir Lancelot and Sir Tristam of the Round Table set out to rescue their friend. They encountered Sir Carados carrying Sir Gawain bound and tied across his saddle and after a legendary fight Sir Lancelot killed the giant at Killguards near Weston Church freeing Sir Gawain.

Legend has it that King Arthur addressed his knights in the caves contained within this parkland. There is a legend that one of the caves of Hawkstone Park was the burial ground of King Arthur.

There is a folklore belief that the Holy Grail was in the grotto caves in Hawkstone; this is associated with an early Roman scent jar which was found inside a sculpture of an eagle when that sculpture broke in the 1920s.

== Culture and cultural references ==
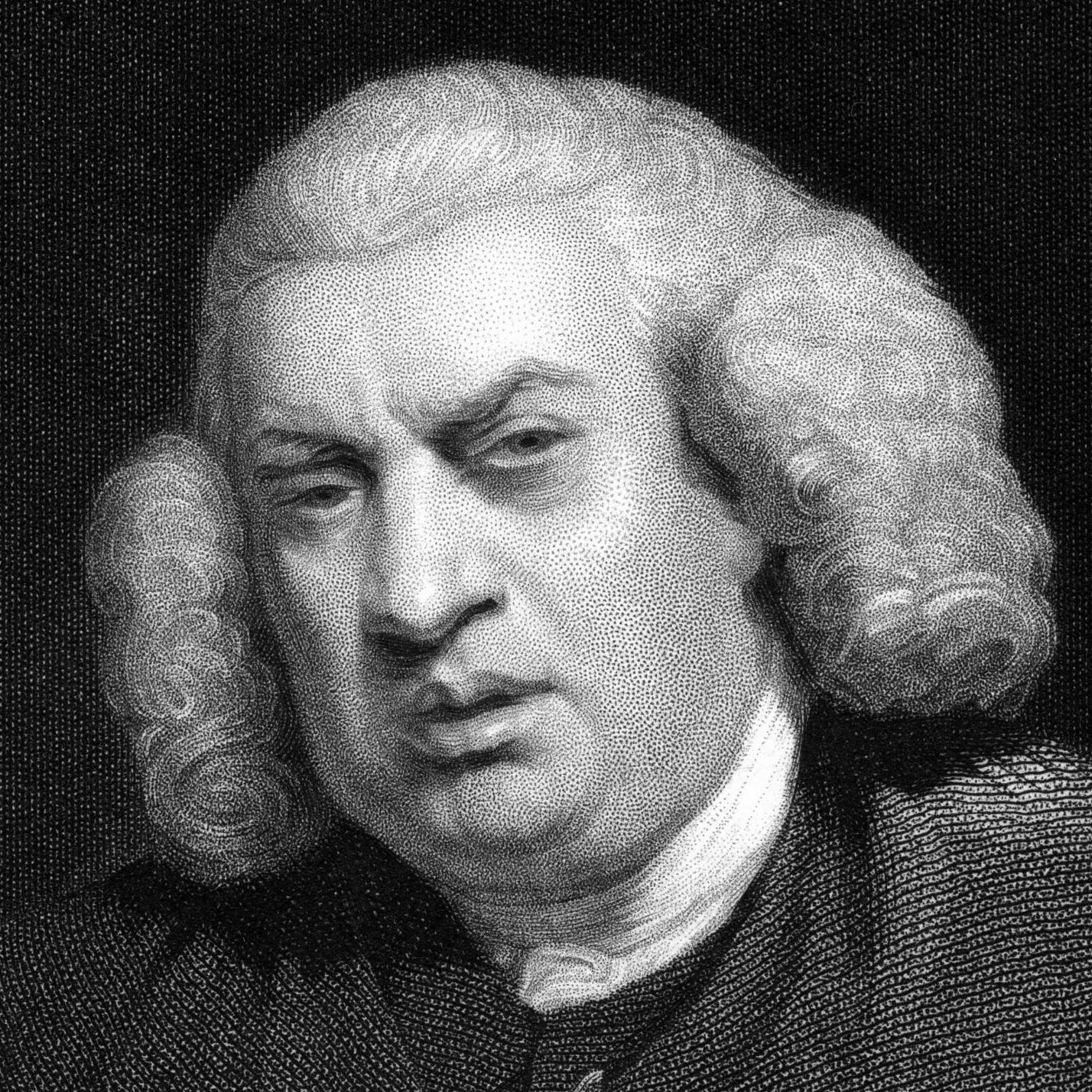
Samuel Johnson visited the landscape, which was nationally renowned for centuries.

Dr. Johnson visited and wrote of Hawkstone as follows:

"its prospects, the awfulness of its shades, the horrors of its precipices, the verdure of its hollows and the loftiness of its rocks ... above is inaccessible altitude, below is horrible profundity." (1774).

Erasmus Darwin (grandfather of Charles Darwin) also visited, and notes the outcrops of copper-bearing rocks...

"at Hawkstone in Shropshire, the seat of Sir Richard Hill, there is an elevated rock of siliceous sand which is coloured green with copper in many places high in the air." (1783).

Pasquale Paoli visited the landscape.

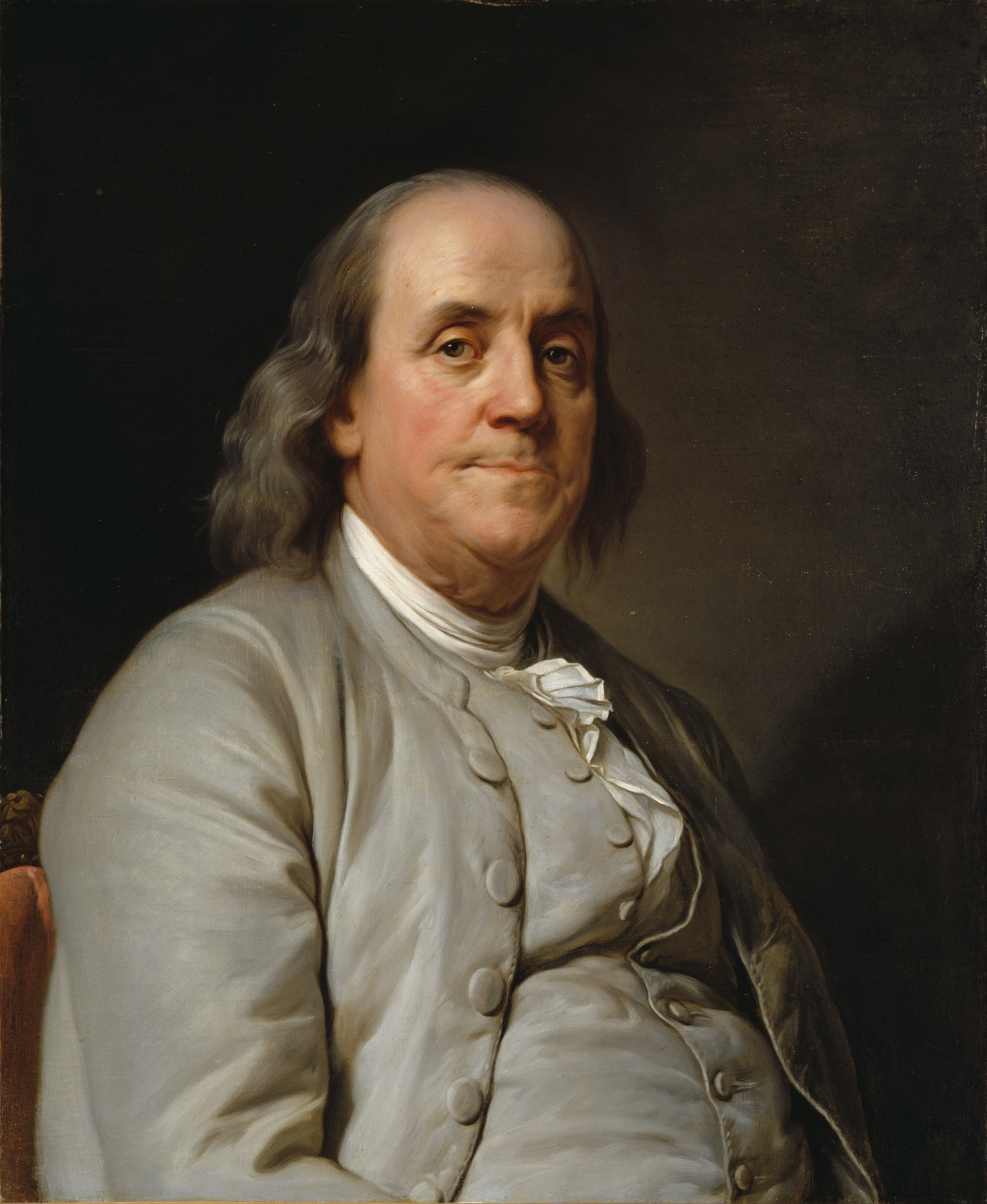
Benjamin Franklin knew of the Hawkstone landscape.

Benjamin Franklin knew the landscape and the family.

A sonnet was written about the view from Hawkstone in the early 1800s in the following terms:

O, gentle Spirit of these fairy lands!

Where fragrant Bowers and peaceful Caves abound,

Where craggy Rocks with green eternal crown'd

Frown on the Vale, in which quiescent stands

The silver Lake expansive; where the Tower,

Relict of ages, casts a mournful shade

Along the turf, 'neath which the bones are laid

Of warriors once exalted high in power,

Who wielded here, in martial line, the sword:-

Where Order dwells with rude Disorder wild,

In scenes-tremendous these, those sweetly mild: -

Spirit! a place in these thy haunts afford:"

Here gay and sad a calm retreat may find,-

Peace for the peaceless breast-Joy for the joyful mind.

== Current operations ==
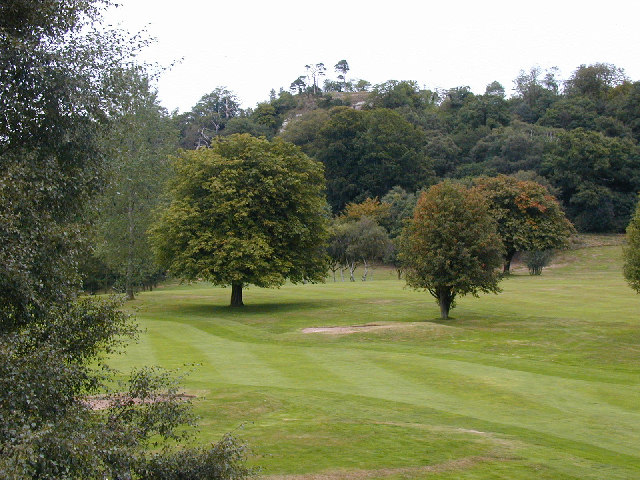
The golf course around the follies

Hawkstone follies is currently combined with an adjacent hotel (formerly a lodge of the hall) marketed in association with the Principal Hayley Group golf course.

=== Golf course ===
Hawkstone Park has two 18-hole golf courses, set in and around the parkland. Sandy Lyle was tutored in golf by his father Alex, who was the resident golf professional at Hawkstone.

== See also ==
- Listed buildings in Weston-under-Redcastle
