= Viscount Hill =

Title in the Peerage of the United Kingdom

Viscountcy of Hill
- Blazon: Arms: Quarterly: 1st and 4th, Ermine a Fess Sable charged with a Castle triple towered Argent (Hill); 2nd and 3rd, Per pale Sable and Azure a Cross Crosslet crossed between two Acorns in bend dexter and as many Fleur-de-lis in bend sinister Argent (Clegg).; Crests: 1st: a Tower Argent issuant from the battlements a Wreath of Laurel all proper (Hill); 2nd: in front of two Branches of Oak in saltire fructed proper a Cross Crosslet crossed Or (Clegg).; Supporters: Dexter: a Lion guardant Argent; Sinister: a Horse Sable maned tailed and hoofed Or
- Creation date: 1842
- Created by: Queen Victoria
- Peerage: Peerage of United Kingdom
- First holder: Rowland Hill, 1st Viscount Hill
- Present holder: (Peter) David Raymond Charles Clegg-Hill, 9th Viscount Hill
- Heir apparent: Hon. Michael Charles David Clegg-Hill
- Subsidiary titles: Baron Hill; Baronet Clegg-Hill of Hawkestone
- Status: Extant
- Former seat: Hawkstone Hall
- Motto: ADVANCEZ; Forward

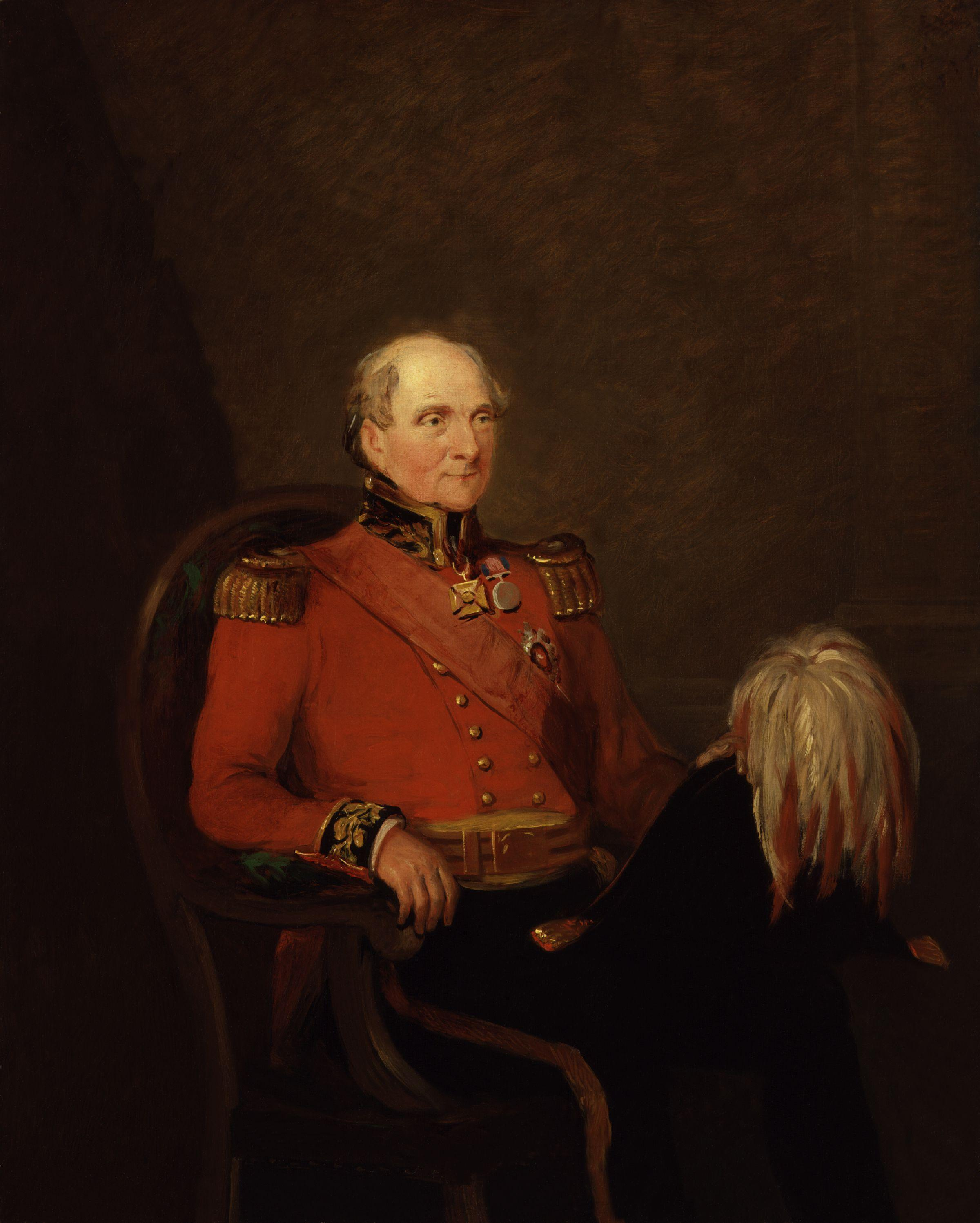
Rowland Hill, 1st Viscount Hill

Viscount Hill, of Hawkstone and of Hardwicke in the County of Salop, is a title in the Peerage of the United Kingdom. It was created in 1842 for General Rowland Hill. He had already been created Baron Hill, of Almaraz and of Hawkstone in the County of Salop, in 1814, with remainder to the heirs male of his body, and Baron Hill, of Almarez and of Hawkestone and Hardwicke in the County of Salop, in 1816, with remainder to the heirs male of his elder brother John Hill. The viscountcy was created with the same special remainder. On the first Viscount's death in 1842, the barony of 1814 became extinct as he had no male issue, while he was succeeded in the barony of 1816 and the viscountcy according to the special remainders by his nephew Sir Rowland Hill, 4th Baronet. His son, the 3rd Viscount, sat as a Conservative Member of Parliament for Shropshire North. In 1875, he assumed by royal licence the additional surname of Clegg, which was that of his maternal grandfather. He inherited financial problems from his father which led to the breakup and sale of the family estates.

The Hill, later Clegg-Hill baronetcy, of Hawkestone in the County of Shropshire, was created in the Baronetage of Great Britain in 1727 for the first Viscount's grandfather Rowland Hill, with remainder to his cousins Samuel Hill, of Shenstone, Thomas Hill, of Tern (whose eldest son Noel Hill was created Baron Berwick in 1784) and Rowland Hill, brother of Thomas. The baronetcy was created in honour of Rowland Hill's uncle, the diplomat and statesman the Rev. and Hon. Richard Hill of Hawkstone (1655–1727). Sir Rowland Hill later represented Lichfield in Parliament. His son, Sir Richard Hill, 2nd Baronet, represented Shropshire. He was succeeded by his younger brother, the third Baronet. He sat as a Member of Parliament for Shrewsbury. His grandson, the fourth Baronet, represented Shropshire and Shropshire North as a Tory, before he succeeded his uncle in the barony and viscountcy of Hill. He later served as Lord Lieutenant of Shropshire. He married Anne Clegg heiress of Peplow Hall in 1831.

A boarding house at Wellington College, Berkshire was named after the first Viscount around the time of the school's construction in the 1850s.

The family seat was Hawkstone Hall, near Market Drayton, Shropshire.

== Hill, later Clegg-Hill baronets of Hawkestone (1727) ==
- Sir Rowland Hill, 1st Baronet (1705–1783)
- Sir Richard Hill, 2nd Baronet (1733–1808)
- Sir John Hill, 3rd Baronet (1740–1824)
- Sir Rowland Hill, 4th Baronet (1800–1875) (succeeded as 2nd Viscount Hill in 1842)

== Baron Hill, First Creation (1814) ==
- Rowland Hill, 1st Baron Hill (1772–1842)

== Viscount Hill (1842) and Baron Hill, Second Creation (1816) ==
- Rowland Hill, 1st Viscount Hill (1772–1842)
- Rowland Hill, 2nd Viscount Hill (1800–1875)
- Rowland Clegg-Hill, 3rd Viscount Hill (1833–1895)
- Rowland Richard Clegg-Hill, 4th Viscount Hill (1863–1923)
- Francis William Clegg-Hill, 5th Viscount Hill (1866–1924)
- Charles Rowland Clegg-Hill, 6th Viscount Hill (1876–1957)
- Gerald Rowland Clegg-Hill, 7th Viscount Hill (1904–1974)
- Antony Rowland Clegg-Hill, 8th Viscount Hill (1931–2003)
- (Peter) David Raymond Charles Clegg-Hill, 9th Viscount Hill (b. 1945)

The heir apparent is the present holder's son Hon. Michael Charles David Clegg-Hill (b. 1988).

== See also ==
- Baron Berwick
- Hawkstone Park
- Rowland Hill (preacher)
- Rowland Hill (postal reformer)

Baronetage of Great Britain
Preceded by Farnaby baronets	Hill baronets of Hawkstone; 20 January 1727	Succeeded by Turner baronets
