= Bury Walls =

Iron Age hillfort in Shropshire, England

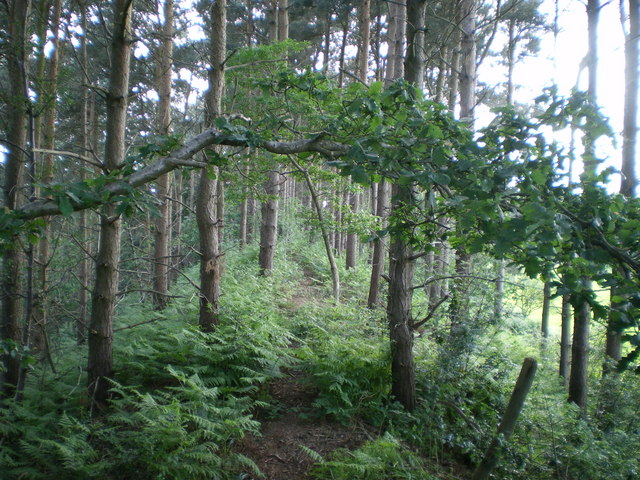
- Rampart of Bury Walls

- Location within Shropshire
- 52°50′34″N 2°37′43″W
- Type: Hillfort
- Periods: Iron Age
- Location: Near Weston-under-Redcastle, Shropshire
- OS grid reference: SJ 577 274

Site notes
- Elevation: 160 m (520 ft)
- Length: 520 metres (1,710 ft)
- Width: 380 metres (1,250 ft)
- Area: 8 hectares (20 acres)

Identifiers
- Atlas of Hillforts: 0048

Scheduled monument
- Designated: 17 December 1929
- Reference no.: 1020284

Bury Walls is an Iron Age hillfort about 1 mile (1.6 km) south-east of Weston-under-Redcastle, in Shropshire, England. It is a scheduled monument.

== Description ==
The fort is on a promontory facing south-west, part of the southern escarpment of a sandstone ridge. The altitude is 160 metres (520 ft). The enclosure is about 520 metres (1,710 ft) north to south and 380 metres (1,250 ft) east to west; the area within is about 8 hectares (20 acres).

There are steep slopes on all sides except the north, where there are two massive ramparts and ditches, the inner rampart being about 7.8 metres (26 ft) above the interior. Elsewhere there is a single rampart around the edge of the promontory, about 3.0 metres (10 ft) along the east side and up to 1.8 metres (5 ft 11 in) along the west side.

From the enclosure there are extensive views to the south, and there is a natural spring within the enclosure. The main entrance is near the north-east corner: there is an inturned entrance about 5 metres (16 ft) wide.

== Excavation and surveys ==
In 1930 there was some excavation of the site by E. W. Bowcock. It was found that the bedrock at the entrance was cut by cart ruts. To the right of the entrance there were two areas of broken stone, perhaps indicating hearths, and a possible quern-stone. Near the centre of the interior, foundations of a building were discovered, thought at the time to be medieval, but more recently thought to be the remains of a Romano-Celtic temple.

In 1999 and 2000 there were geophysical and topographical surveys. In the northern part of the interior, there was evidence of a series of large concentric terraces; the material taken during their creation was apparently used for the defences.

== See also ==
- Hillforts in Britain
- Geology of Shropshire
