= Sir Richard Hill, 2nd Baronet =

English politician (1732–1808)

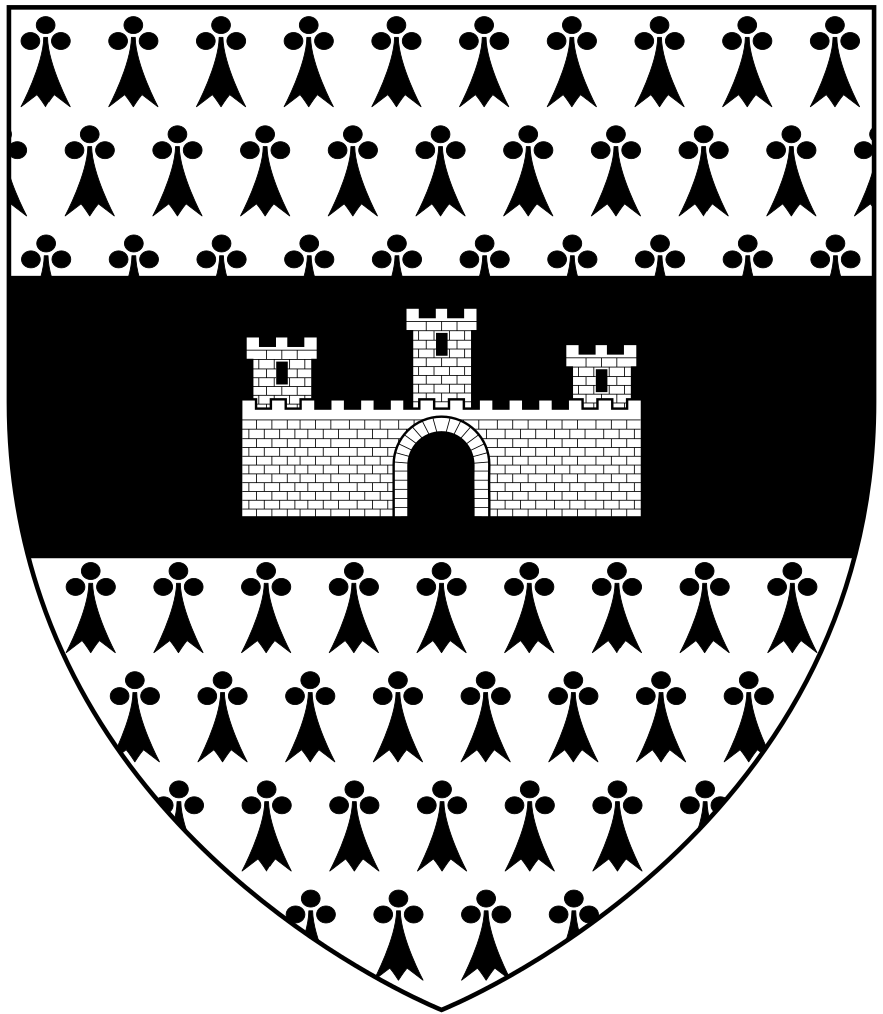
- Born: 6 June 1732; Hawkstone, Shropshire
- Died: 28 August 1808 (aged 76)
- Education: Westminster School, Shrewsbury School, and Magdalen College, Oxford
- Occupations: Parliamentarian, Methodist
- Parent(s): Sir Rowland Hill and Jane Broughton

Sir Richard Hill, 2nd Baronet of Hawkstone (6 June 1732 – 28 August 1808), was a prominent religious revivalist and Tory Member of Parliament for Shropshire 1780–1806.

== Life ==
He was the eldest son of Sir Rowland Hill, 1st Baronet, who was also a first cousin of Thomas Hill, of Tern (today Attingham Park); his mother was Jane, daughter of Sir Brian Broughton, 3rd Baronet, of Broughton, by Elizabeth Delves. The Hills of Hawkstone owed their status and fortune to the "Great Hill", the Hon. Richard Hill (1655-1727), diplomatist and statesman, great-uncle of Sir Richard Hill. His nephew, Rowland, was a distinguished soldier, created first Viscount Hill of Hawkstone (d. 1842), and his brother was the Evangelical preacher, also named Rowland Hill.

Richard Hill was educated at Shrewsbury School, Westminster School and Magdalen College, Oxford. He became a writer of religious tracts, a patron of Methodists and tolerant of Dissenters, who supported George Whitfield against John Wesley. In Parliament he was a supporter of William Pitt the Younger. Nathaniel Wraxall writes that he was

"one of the most upright, honest and disinterested men who ever sat in Parliament… but his religious cast of character laid him open to … ridicule. His manners were quaint and puritanical, his address shy and embarrassed. He possessed, however, a most benevolent disposition, together with a great estate, which enabled him to gratify his generous and philanthropic feelings."

Hill developed the landscape garden at Hawkstone as one of the most notable and visited of the day, with its features of follies and grottos, and column surmounted by a statue of his ancestor, Sir Rowland Hill, the first Protestant Lord Mayor of London. He created a garden of epiphany, a landscape that would display God's majesty in the natural grandeur of Shropshire's rugged hills: "the smooth lawns gave it beauty; the lake and the ruin made it picturesque; and the craggy hills singled it out as one of the very few sublime gardens in the country." It had a 10-mile circuit of novel features, including scenes representing Switzerland and Tahiti. Its excited visitor was left perched on a ‘Raven’s Shelf’, below which cliffs dropped hundreds of feet.

Sir Richard Hill's estate was large even by the standards of the day, but not without difficulties in its administration. In 1790 his steward, George Downward, was found negligent, but Hill did not discharge him. Extravagance continued: in 1796 Hill did not flinch from a very expensive parliamentary contest with his Attingham kinsmen, William Hill, and in 1816 the Hawkstone estate was hit hard by the failure of Thomas Eyton, receiver general of Shropshire.

His tomb in Hodnet in Shropshire was sculpted by John Carline.

== Works ==
- Pietas Oxoniensis : or a full and impartial account of the expulsion of six students from St. Edmund Hall, Oxford : with a dedication to the Right Honourable the Earl of Litchfield, Chancellor of that University (1768)
- The Right Knowledge of God, and of Ourselves, Opened in a Plain, Practical and Experimental Manner
- Deep Things of God: Or, Milk and Strong Meat: Containing Spiritual and Experimental Remarks and Meditations, Suited to the Cases of Babes, Young Men, and ... and who Feel the Plague of Their Own Hearts (1788)
- Daubenism Confuted, and Martin Luther Vindicated. With Further Remarks on the False Quotations Adduced by the Reverend Charles Daubeny ... in His Late Publications

== See also ==
- Attingham Park
- Baron Berwick
- Hawkstone Park
- Richard Hill of Hawkstone
- Rowland Hill
- Viscount Hill

Baronetage of Great Britain
Preceded by Rowland Hill	Baronet (of Hawkestone); 1783–1808	Succeeded by John Hill
