= Hawkstone Hall =

Wedding Venue/Hotel in Shropshire, England

Coordinates: 52.8652°N 2.6233°W

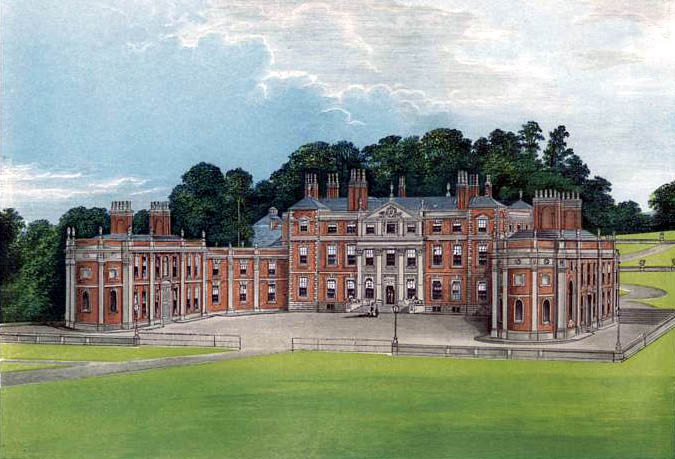
Hawkstone Hall

Hawkstone Hall is a 43,400 square feet (4,030 m^{2}) early 18th-century country mansion near Hodnet and Weston-under-Redcastle, Shropshire, England which was more recently occupied as the pastoral centre of a religious organisation for many years. It is a Grade I listed building.

It has been converted to a wedding and events venue with hotel bedrooms. It is on the edge of Hawkstone Park, which is now run separately.

== History ==
There was no manor house at Hawkstone until around the eighteenth century.

The original senior house in the manor was the Red Castle. It was a ruin when Leland visited in around 1540. That building is still a ruin and it is inside the Follies Park.

Arms of the Audley family, who held the Red Castle

The Audley family, later allied to the Stanley family held it in the medieval period: Dugdale informs us that "this castle was erected in the reign of Henry III; but there is an ancient manuscript in the Audley family, which proves that its original existence was of much earlier date. It is there said that 'Maud, or Matilde, wife of William the Conqueror, gave to John de Audley and to his heirs, the lands about Red Castle, in the county of Salop, for certain services done by him to the state."

Sir Rowland Hill of Soulton (located nearby) bought Hawkstone in the same conveyance as that for Soulton. Hill coordinated the Geneva Bible and is associated with Shakespeare's play As You Like It.

In the Tudor period the senior house at Hawkstone is recorded as being in ruins and Hill built his house at Soulton, and it is understood Hill recruited the manor for his landscape gardens but did not live there.

=== The Hall at Hawkstone ===
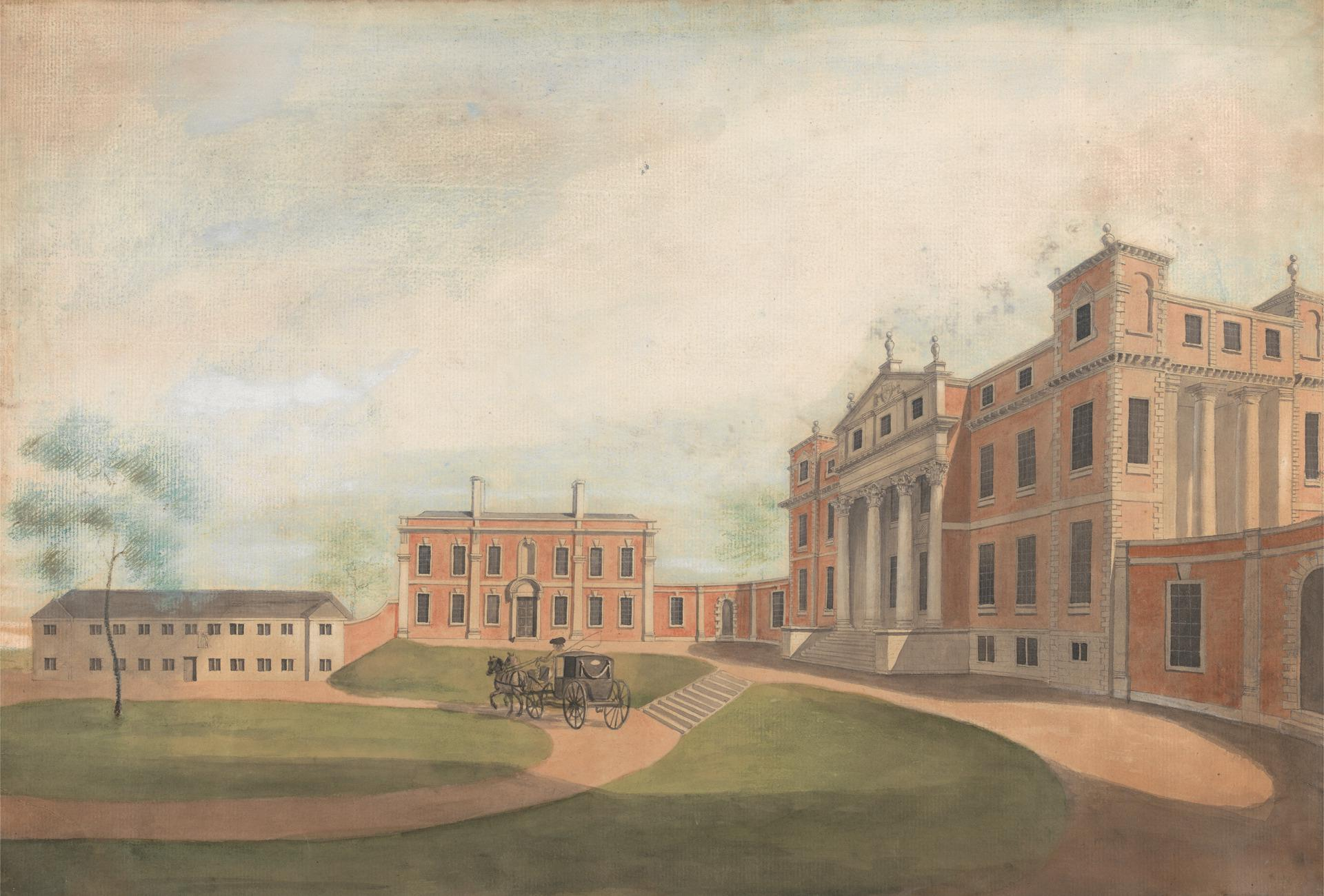
Eighteenth century view of the hall, before the composition was altered by later work

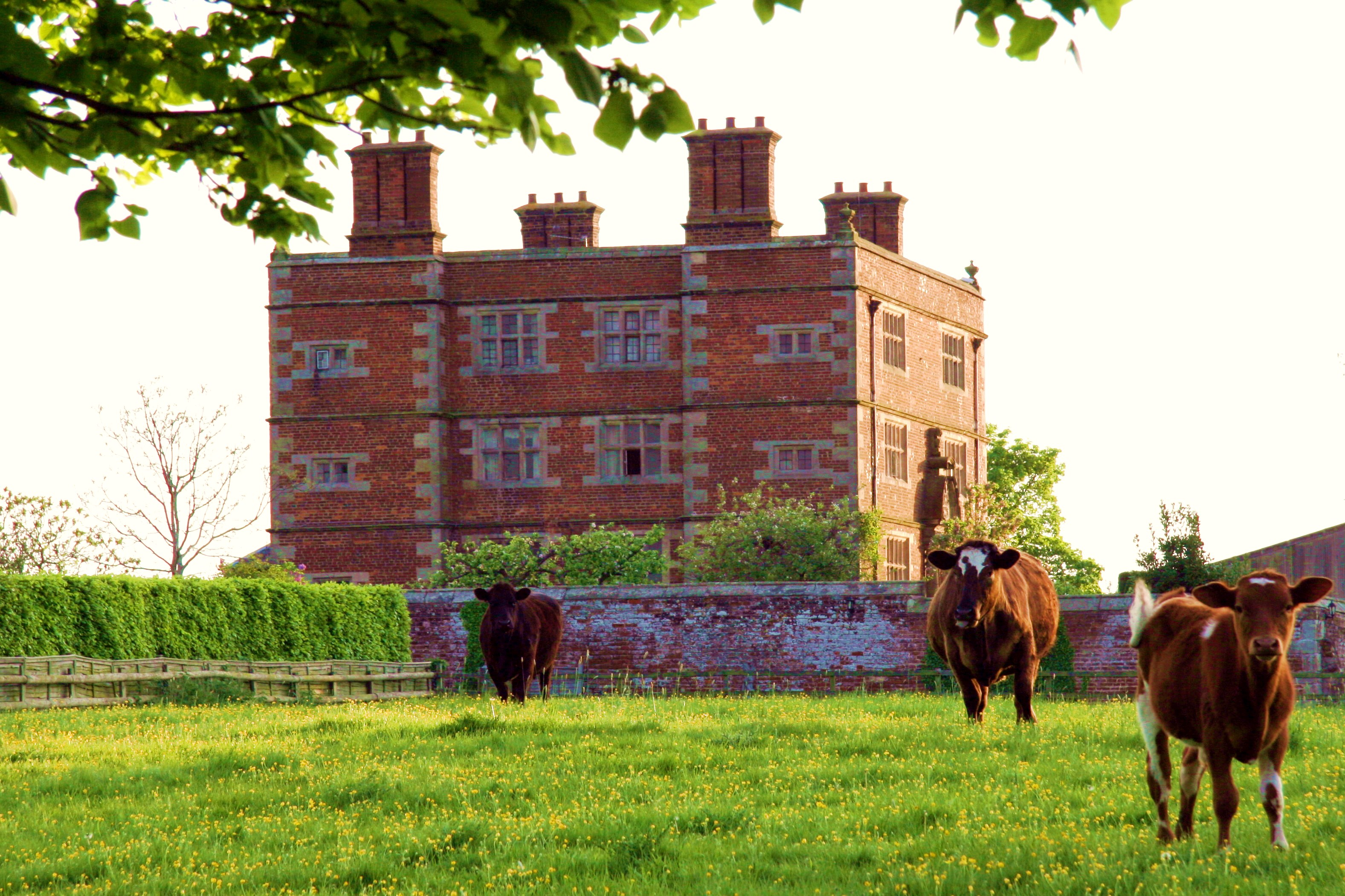
Sir Rowland Hill's house at Soulton: the land at Hawkstone was recruited for use in the landscape gardens addressing this house in the Tudor period - a time when the senior house at Hawkstone was in ruins.

The house was built between 1701 and 1725 by Richard Hill of Hawkstone (1655–1727), second of the Hill baronets, of Hawkstone. It borrows extensively in style from the house at Soulton.

Brothers Rowland (1st Viscount Hill) and Robert Hill, who fought at the 1815 Battle of Waterloo were both born at the Hall. The manor was seat of a branch the Shropshire Hill family for more than 300 years.

A line of the Shropshire Hill family held Hawkstone until the collapse of the Hawkstone line of the Hills in the time of Rowland Clegg-Hill, the 3rd Viscount Hill on his death in 1895, forced the sale of the hall's contents and the split up of the estate by 1906.

=== 20th century ===
==== After the Hill family ====
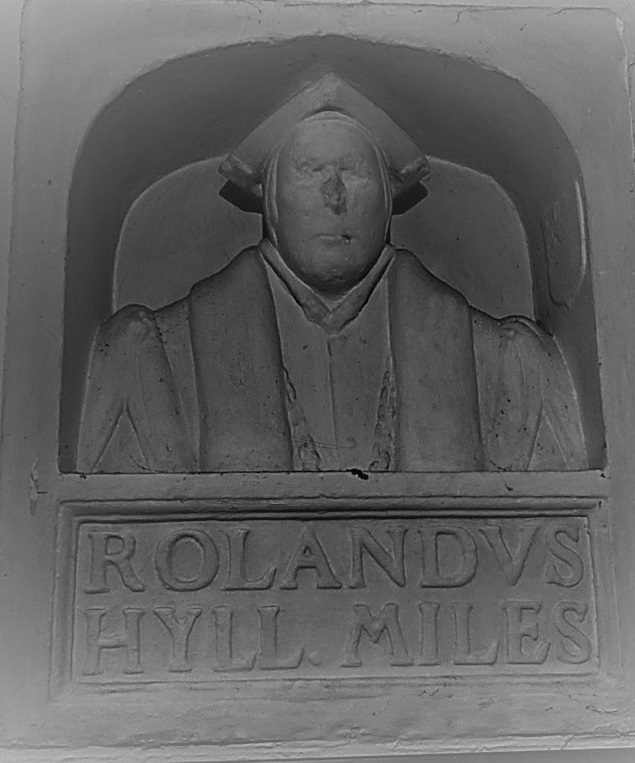
Sir Rowland Hill of Soulton bought the land of the manor in 1556.

The house was sold to the Liberal politician George Whitely, who had previously represented Stockport and Pudsey in the House of Commons, where he was a Liberal whip in Parliament – later to become Baron Marchamley in 1908. George Whiteley had the hall renovated and the wings reduced in length by William Tomkinsons of Liverpool, supervised by H.P. Dallow, brother in law of Henry Price. The chapel wing was reconstructed as a games room with dance floor and the other wing as servants’ quarters.

==== Seminary ====
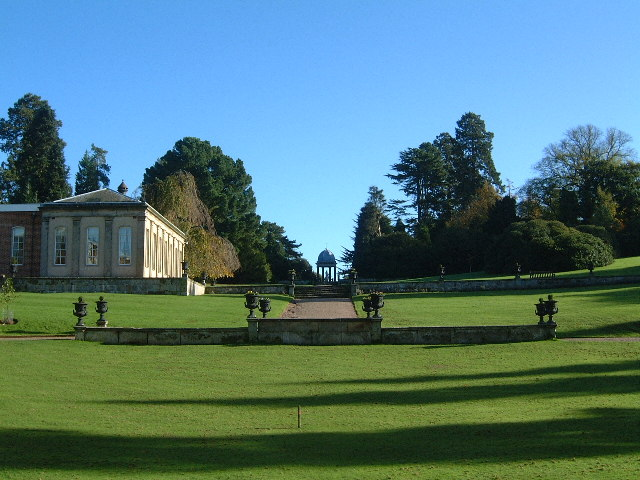
The gardens

The hall was acquired after Lord Marchamley's death by the Roman Catholic Redemptorist Order in 1926 and, until 1973, was a seminary. The Order added a chapel in 1932 and further extended the Hall in 1962, converting the north-east service wing into a residential wing. The seminary relocated in 1973, and since 1975 the Hall was a Pastoral and Renewal Centre.

== Landscape gardens ==
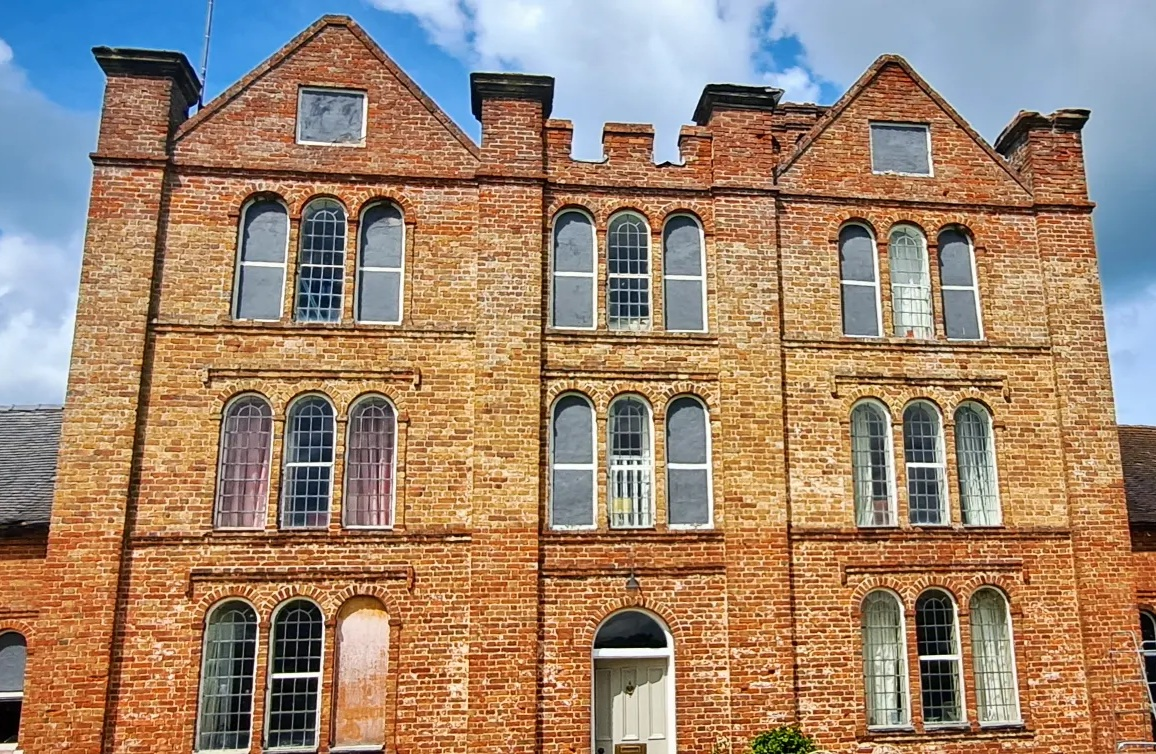
Hawkstone Abbey Farm, visible from the driveway and part of the estate in years gone by, now home to award winning cheese production

There are extensive landscape gardens sharing the sandstone cliffs on which Hawkstone Hall sits. These were recruited by the Hill family in the time of Sir Rowland Hill of Soulton and by Richard Hill the great Hill in the eighteenth century for allegorical story telling in the landscape.

There is a view from the drive of Hawkstone Hall to the west to Hawkstone Abbey Farm, over Hawk Lake.

== Current use ==
Hawkstone was put on the market in 2014. It was bought by The Distinctly Hospitable Group Ltd. in August 2017. The new owners received change of use planning permission, for a hotel wedding/events venue. These changes took place in 2017-2018. Members of the Hill family expressed their disappointment at the change to commercial use.

== See also ==
- Hawkstone Park
- Soulton Hall
- Grade I listed buildings in Shropshire
- Listed buildings in Hodnet, Shropshire
