= Richard Hill of Hawkstone =

British diplomat (1654–1727)

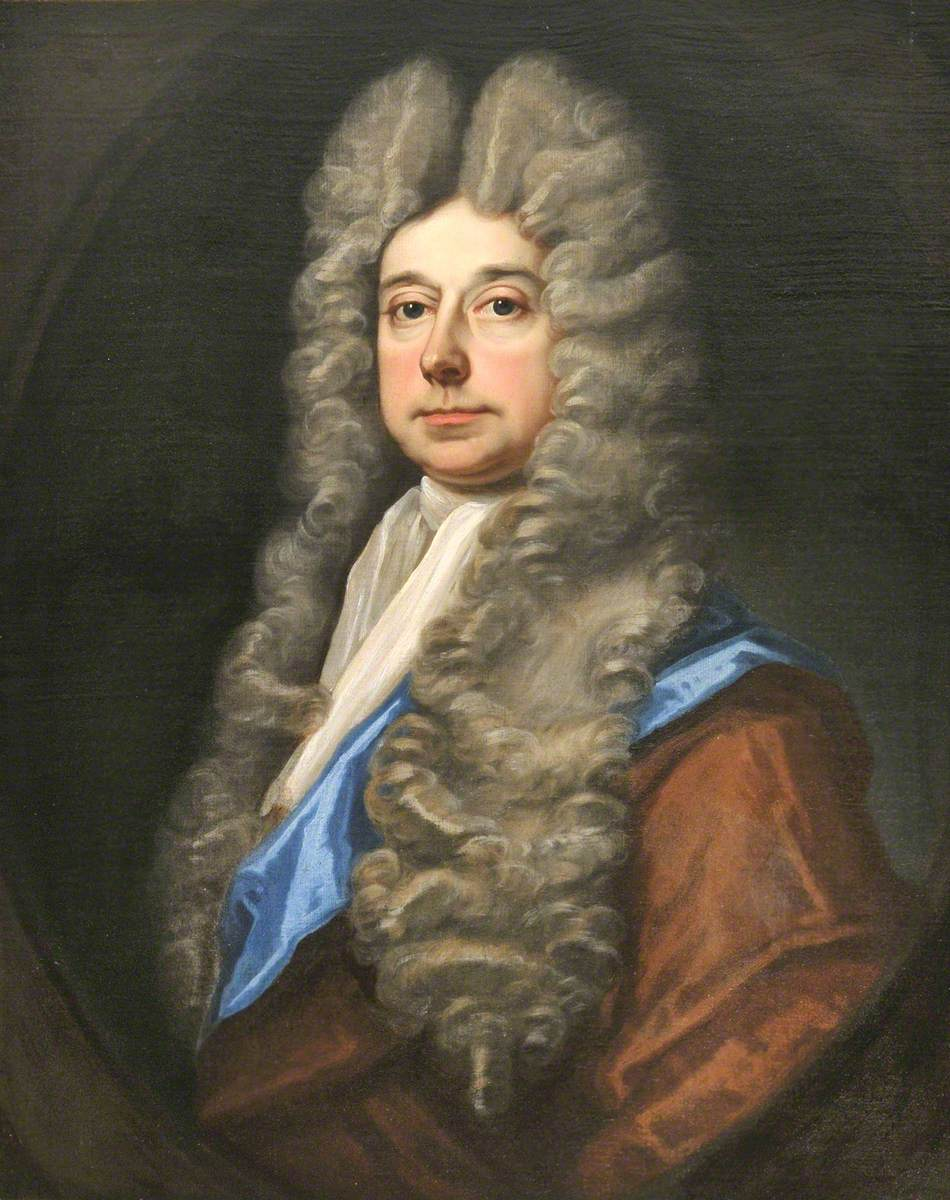
- Portrait (before 1700)
- Born: 23 March 1655 (baptized); Hodnet, Shropshire
- Died: 11 June 1727; Richmond, Surrey
- Education: Shrewsbury School; St John's College, Cambridge
- Occupations: diplomatist, statesman, public servant
- Parent(s): Rowland Hill and Margaret Whitehall

Richard Hill of Hawkstone Hall, Shropshire, was baptised at Hodnet, Shropshire, on 23 March 1655 and died unmarried at Richmond, Surrey, on 11 June 1727, aged 72. He was known as 'the Great Hill', diplomatist, public servant and statesman, who accumulated great wealth through a series of profitable appointments and judicious dealings.

He was the second son of Rowland Hill (baptised 1623?) of Hawkstone and his wife, Margaret Whitehall of Doddington, Shropshire. He was educated at Shrewsbury School and admitted to St John's College, Cambridge (BA 1679; MA 1682), and was ordained deacon. In 1675, he worked as a tutor to the sons of Richard Boyle, 1st Earl of Burlington, and then to the children of Laurence Hyde, 1st Earl of Rochester. Through Hyde, he became acquainted with Richard Jones, 1st Earl of Ranelagh, paymaster of the forces, by whom he was appointed deputy paymaster of William III to the army in Flanders during the War of the Grand Alliance, 1688–96.

In the 1690s and early 18th century he went on to hold several eminent positions. He served as a diplomat during the War of the Spanish Succession, as envoy to Maximilian II Emanuel, Elector of Bavaria in Brussels, and to the Duke of Savoy in Turin, whom he persuaded to join the Grand Alliance. Hill made the allies guarantors for the Vaudois, a medieval heretic sect, later Protestants, who had suffered centuries of persecution by the dukes of Savoy, and they were guaranteed toleration, so that the Vaudois pastors placed him 'at the head of our Nehemiahs' (Diplomatic Correspondence, 2.973).

In 1699 he was ambassador at the court of The Hague. Hill returned to England to become a Commissioner of the Admiralty (1702–08). He was appointed a Lord of the Treasury (1699–1702) and Counsellor to Prince George of Denmark, the Prince Consort of Queen Anne. William III 'did often declare that he had never employed two ministers of greater vigilance, capacity and virtue than yourself, my Lord, and the Reverend Mr Hill' (according to a 1720 dedication to John Robinson, bishop of London, who had been Lord Privy Seal).

He was given a final appointment to Brussels, but he retired in 1710 due to ill-health, entering holy orders in the Church of England. He refused a bishopric in the hopes of taking that of Ely, and became a fellow of Eton College in 1714. He lived quietly as tenant at Cleveland House, St James's, and at Trumpeters' House at the Old Palace, Richmond, where 'he was much resorted to by the most eminent persons of the time [and] the Royal family shewed him very particular regards' (Gilbert Burnet, 4.318).

He died at Richmond in 1727 and was buried at Hodnet.

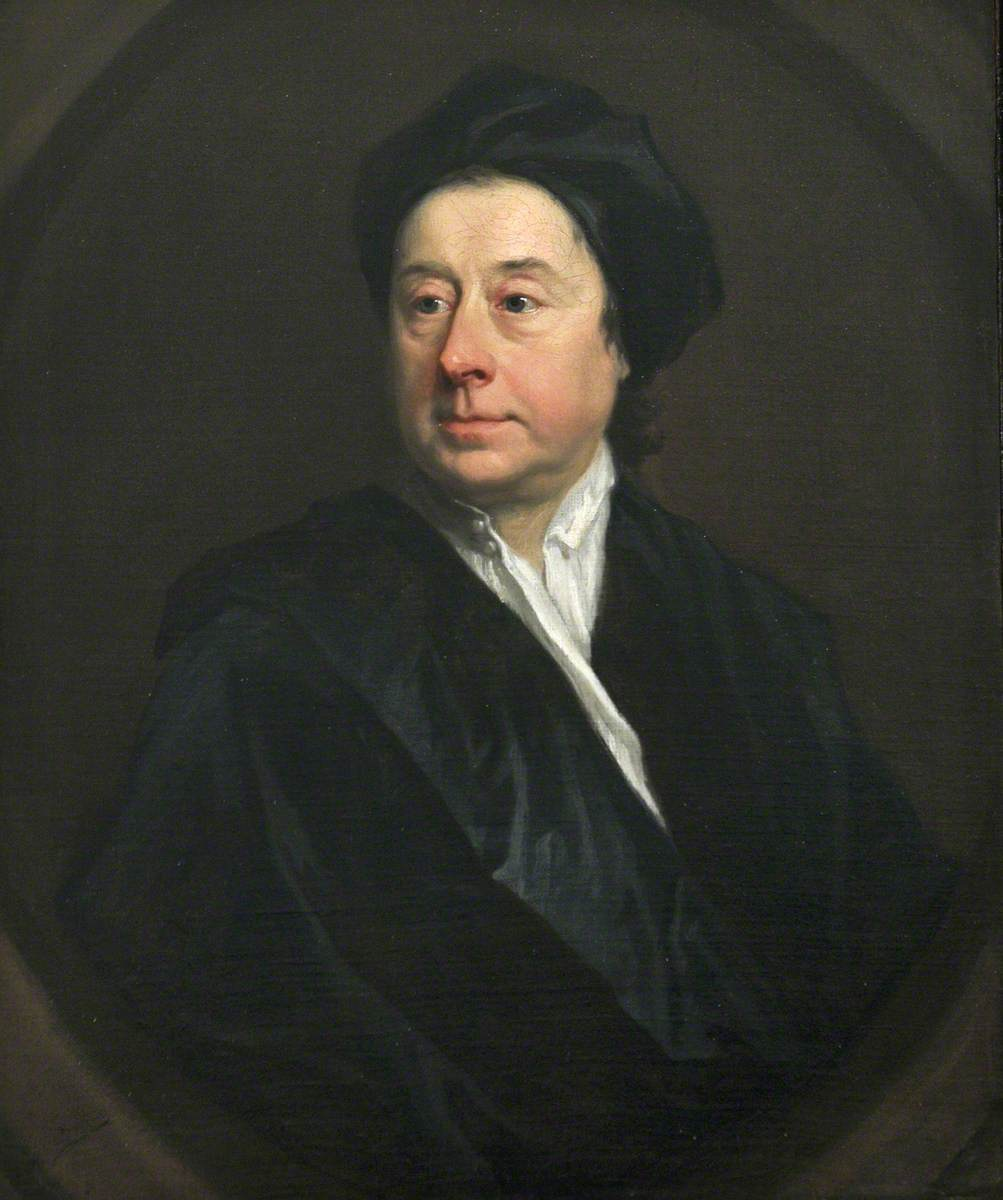
Portrait c. 1720

Hill inherited Hawkstone Hall in 1700 and reordered the mansion and park to his own designs. With the fortune he made from his paymastership (subsequently augmented by loans, investments and mortgages), he extended his estates at Tern Hall, Atcham, near Shrewsbury (today Attingham Park), and at Shenstone, Staffordshire, and systematically purchased estates in many counties, including Shropshire, Staffordshire and Warwickshire, thus adding to his already substantial inheritance with the aim of founding an enduring dynasty. He secured the wealth and influence of the Hills as one of the great families and landowners in 18th- to 19th-century Shropshire, providing liberally for three nephews, especially his protégé Rowland Hill of Hawkstone (1705–1783), who was given a baronetcy in his honour in 1727 and was later father of Richard Hill (1732–1808) and preacher Rowland Hill (1744–1833).

== See also ==
- Viscount Hill
- Sir Richard Hill, 2nd Baronet
- Hawkstone Park
- Attingham Park
- Rowland Hill
- Baron Berwick
