= Duchess of Richmond's ball =

Formal ball in Brussels on 15 June 1815

Coordinates: 50.8535°N 4.3592°E

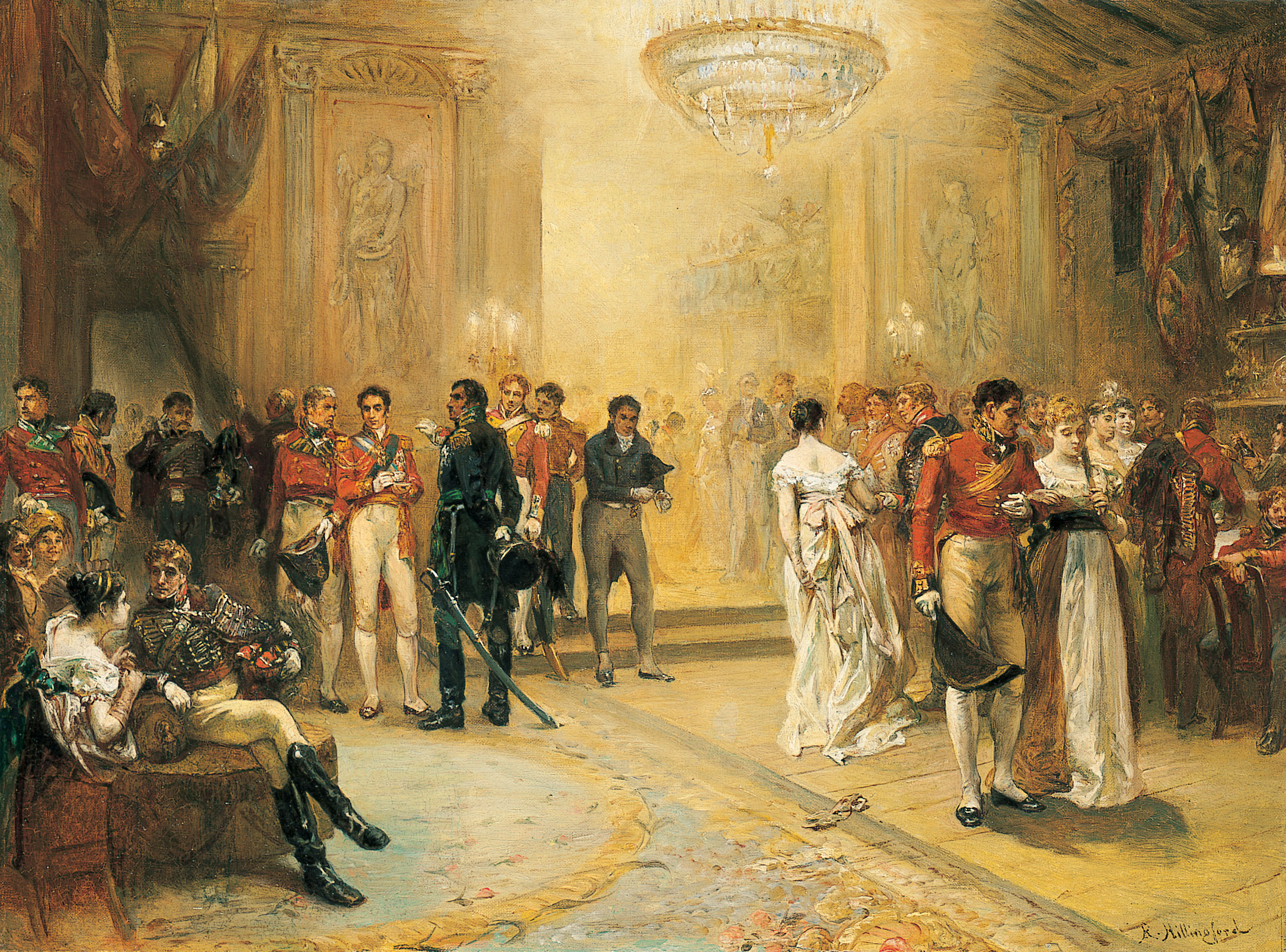
The Duchess of Richmond's Ball (1870s) by Robert Alexander Hillingford

The Duchess of Richmond's ball was a ball hosted by Charlotte Lennox, Duchess of Richmond, in Brussels on 15 June 1815, the night before the Battle of Quatre Bras. Charlotte's husband Charles Lennox, 4th Duke of Richmond, was in command of a reserve force in Brussels, which was protecting that city in case Napoleon Bonaparte invaded.

Elizabeth Longford described it as "the most famous ball in history". "The ball was certainly a brilliant affair", at which "with the exception of three generals, every officer high in Wellington's army was there to be seen".

The proceedings were interrupted soon after the arrival of the Duke of Wellington, when he was notified of Napoleon's unexpected advance on the nearby crossroads of Quatre Bras, located 34 km (21 mi) to the south. This forced him to depart after ordering his officers to leave to join their regiments. Some of the officers would soon die in battle and the poignancy of the drama has provided an enduring theme for artists, novelists and poets.

== The ball ==
According to Lady Georgiana, a daughter of the Duchess:

My mother's now famous ball took place in a large room on the ground-floor on the left of the entrance, connected with the rest of the house by an ante-room. It had been used by the coach-builder, from whom the house was hired, to put carriages in, but it was papered before we came there; and I recollect the paper – a trellis pattern with roses. ... At the ball supper I sat next to the Duke of Wellington, when he gave me an original miniature of himself painted by a Belgian artist.

— Georgiana, Lady de Ros

Lady Louisa, another of the Duchess' daughters, recalled:

I well remember the Gordon Highlanders dancing reels at the ball. My mother thought it would interest foreigners to see them, (Note: Charlotte Richmond was herself a Gordon: the eldest daughter of Alexander Gordon, 4th Duke of Gordon and Jane, daughter of Sir William Maxwell, 3rd Baronet of Monreith.) which it did. I remember hearing that some of the poor men who danced in our house died at Waterloo. There was quite a crowd to look at the Scotch dancers.

— Lady Louisa

While the exact order of the dances at this ball is not known, there is a comment from a contemporary critical observer about the season in Brussels:

Whenever they get together the severest etiquette is present. The women on entering always salute on each side of the cheek; they then set [sic] down as stiff as waxworks. They begin a ball with a perfect froideur, they go on with their dangerous waltz (in which all the Englishwomen join) and finish with the gallopade, a completely indecent and violent romp.

— Revd George Griffin Stonestreet (Note: Due to the French Revolutionary Wars and the Napoleonic Wars, British society had been cut off from the fashions in the rest of Europe and with the end of hostilities in 1814, those who ventured to visit the European Continent were keen to assimilate the latest continental fashions including the new dances (if only not to appear staid and old-fashioned in continental society). Not everyone in Britain approved, and after the waltz was danced at the Prince Regent's court the following year The Times thundered in an editorial about "this obscene display" and warned "every parent against exposing their daughter to so fatal a contagion".)

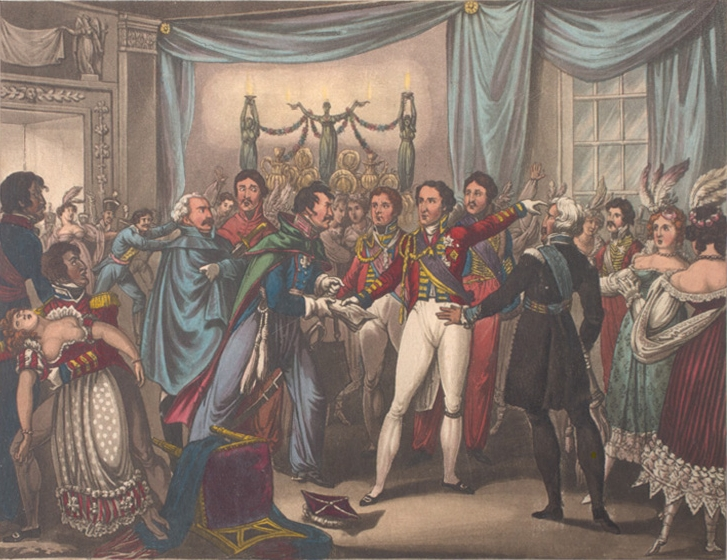
Intelligence of the Battle of Ligny (1818) by William Heath, depicting a Prussian officer informing the Duke of Wellington that the French have crossed the border at Charleroi and that the Prussians would concentrate their army at Ligny

Arthur Wellesley, 1st Duke of Wellington with his intimate staff arrived some time between 11 pm and midnight. (Note: Tim Clayton states Wellington must have arrived around 11 pm (Clayton 2014, p. 76) while Miller places the Duke's arrival around midnight (Miller 2005, p. 67).) Shortly before supper, which started around 1 am, Lieutenant Henry Webster, an aide-de-camp to William, Prince of Orange, arrived with a message for the Prince. The Prince handed it to Wellington, who pocketed it unopened. A short time later Wellington read the message — written at around 10 pm, it reported that Prussian forces had been forced by the French to retreat from Fleurus. As Fleurus is north-east of Charleroi this meant that the French had crossed the river Sambre (although Wellington couldn't tell from this message in what strength) — Wellington requested the Prince to return to his headquarters immediately, and then, after issuing a few more orders, went into supper, where he sat between Lady Frances Wedderburn-Webster and Lady Georgiana Lennox. To his surprise the Prince of Orange returned and in a whisper informed him of another dispatch, this one sent by Baron de Rebecque to the Prince's headquarters at Braine-le-Comte, and timed at 10:30 pm. It informed the Prince that the French had pushed up the main Charleroi to Brussels road nearly as far as Quatre Bras. (Note: This second dispatch provided some additional vital information for Wellington. The first was that as Fleurus was on a different main road out of Charleroi from that of Quatre Bras, this meant the French must have crossed the river Sambre in force. Secondly although Charleroi and Fleurus were picketed by the Prussians, the area directly south of Quatre Bras was picketed by the Anglo-allies and this meant that units of his own command were now head-to-head with the French.) After repeating to the Prince that he should return to his headquarters, Wellington continued to sit at the table and make small talk for 20 minutes more, before announcing that he would retire to bed. He rose from the supper-table and:

... whispered to ask the Duke of Richmond if he had a good map. The Duke of Richmond said he had, and took Wellington into his dressing-room. Wellington shut the door and said, "Napoleon has humbugged me, by God; he has gained twenty-four hours' march on me. ... I have ordered the army to concentrate at Quatre Bras; but we shall not stop him there, and if so I must fight him there" (passing his thumb-nail over the position of Waterloo). The conversation was repeated to me by the Duke of Richmond two minutes after it occurred.

— George Bowles (Note: "In the course of the evening the Duke asked my father for a map of the country and went into his study, which was on the same floor as the ball-room, to look at it. He put his finger on Waterloo, saying the battle would be fought there. My father marked the spot with his pencil, but alas! That map was lost or stolen for it never returned from Canada with his other possessions." (Dowager Lady de Ros 1889, p. 43))

The atmosphere in the room changed when news circulated among the guests that the French were crossing the border:

When the Duke [of Wellington] arrived, rather late, at the ball, I was dancing, but at once went up to him to ask about the rumours. He said very gravely, "Yes, they are true; we are off to-morrow." This terrible news was circulated directly, and while some of the officers hurried away, others remained at the ball, and actually had not time to change their clothes, but fought in evening costume. I went with my eldest brother (ADC to the Prince of Orange) to his house, which stood in our garden, to help him to pack up, after which we returned to the ball-room, where we found some energetic and heartless young ladies still dancing. I heard afterwards that it had been said that "the Ladies Lennox were fine, and did not do the honours of the ball well". ... It was a dreadful evening, taking leave of friends and acquaintances, many never to be seen again. The Duke of Brunswick, as he took leave of me in the ante-room adjoining the ball-room, made me a civil speech as to the Brunswickers being sure to distinguish themselves after "the honour" done them by my having accompanied the Duke of Wellington to their review! I remember being quite provoked with poor Lord Hay, a dashing merry youth, full of military ardour, whom I knew very well for his delight at the idea of going into action, and of all the honours he was to gain; and the first news we had on the 16th was that he and the Duke of Brunswick were killed.

— Georgiana, Lady de Ros

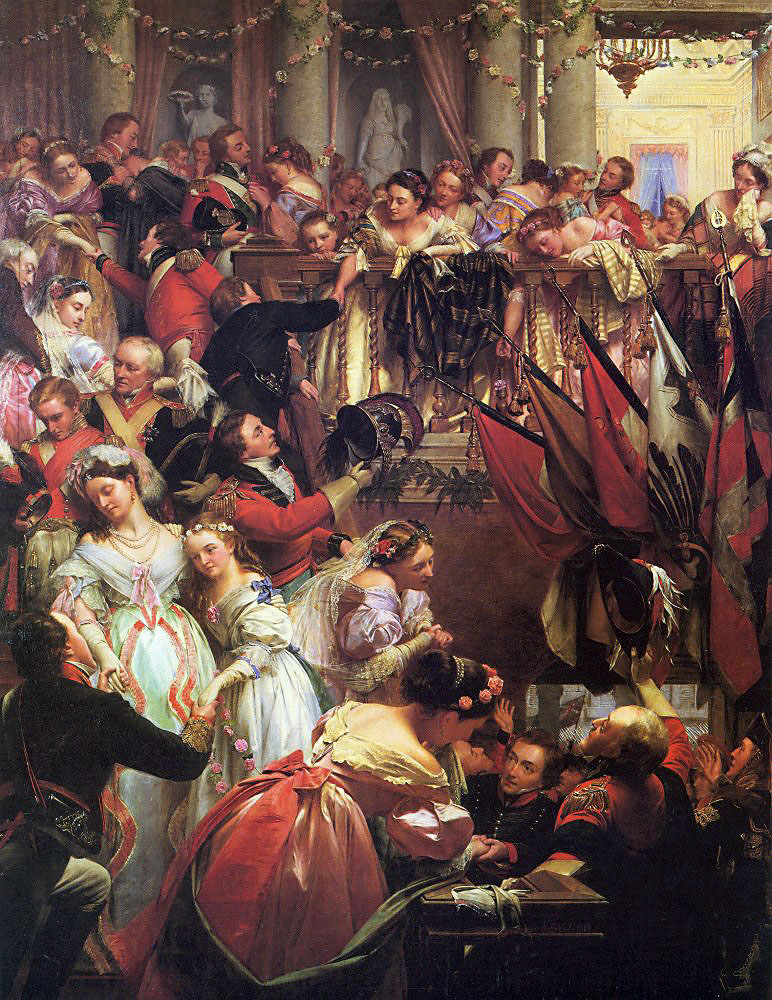
Before Waterloo (1868) by Henry O'Neil, depicting officers departing from the Duchess of Richmond's ball

Katherine Arden, daughter of Richard Arden, 1st Baron Alvanley, described the events towards the end of the ball and the rest of the night:

... on our arrival at the ball we were told that the troops had orders to march at three in the morning, and that every officer must join his regiment by that time, as the French were advancing, you cannot possibly picture to yourself the dismay and consternation that appeared on every face. Those who had brothers and sons to be engaged openly gave way to their grief, as the last parting of many took place at this most terrible ball; others (and, thank Heaven, we ranked amongst that number, for in the midst of my greatest fears I still felt thankfulness was my prominent feeling that my beloved Dick was not here) who had no near relation yet felt that amongst the many friends we all had there it was impossible that all should escape, and that the next time we might hear of them they might be numbered with the dead; in fact, my dear aunt, I cannot describe to you mingled feelings; you will, however, I am sure, understand them, and I feel quite inadequate to express them. We stayed at this ball as short a time as we could, but long enough to see express after express arrive to the Duke of Wellington, to hear of aides-de-camp arriving breathless with news, and to see, what was more extraordinary than all, the Duke's equanimity a little discomposed. We took a mournful farewell of some of our best friends, and returned home to anything but repose. The morning dawned most lovelily [sic], and before seven o'clock, we had seen 12,000 Brunswickers, Scotch and English pass before our windows, of whom one-third before the night were mingled with the dust. Mama took a farewell of Duke [of Wellington] as he passed by, but Fanny and myself, at last wearied out, had before he went, retired to bed.

— Katherine Arden

== Ballroom ==
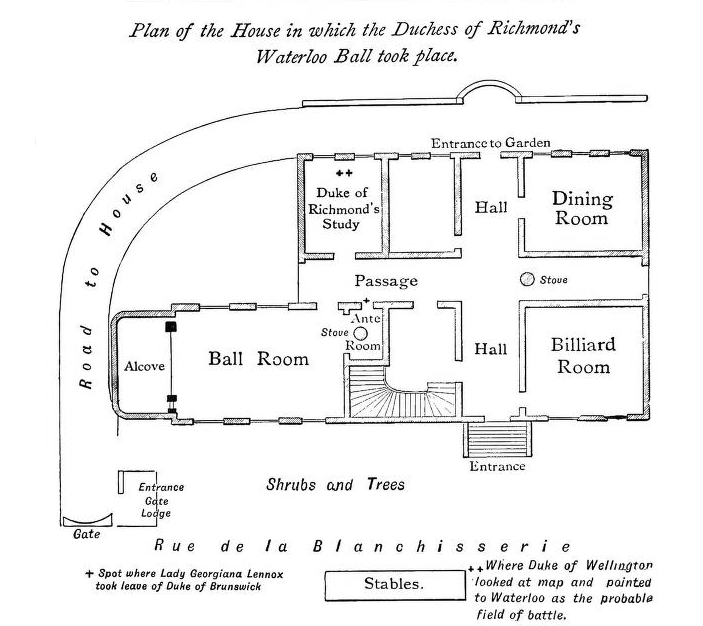
Floor plan by Captain Lord William Lennox, brother of Lady de Ros

At the time of the ball no accurate record was kept of the location of the ballroom. In 1887, a plan of the house provided by her younger brother was published by Lady de Ros (daughter of the Duchess of Richmond); both were residents in the house. It was later reprinted in "Reminiscences of Lady de Ros" by the Hon. Mrs J. R. Swinton, her daughter.

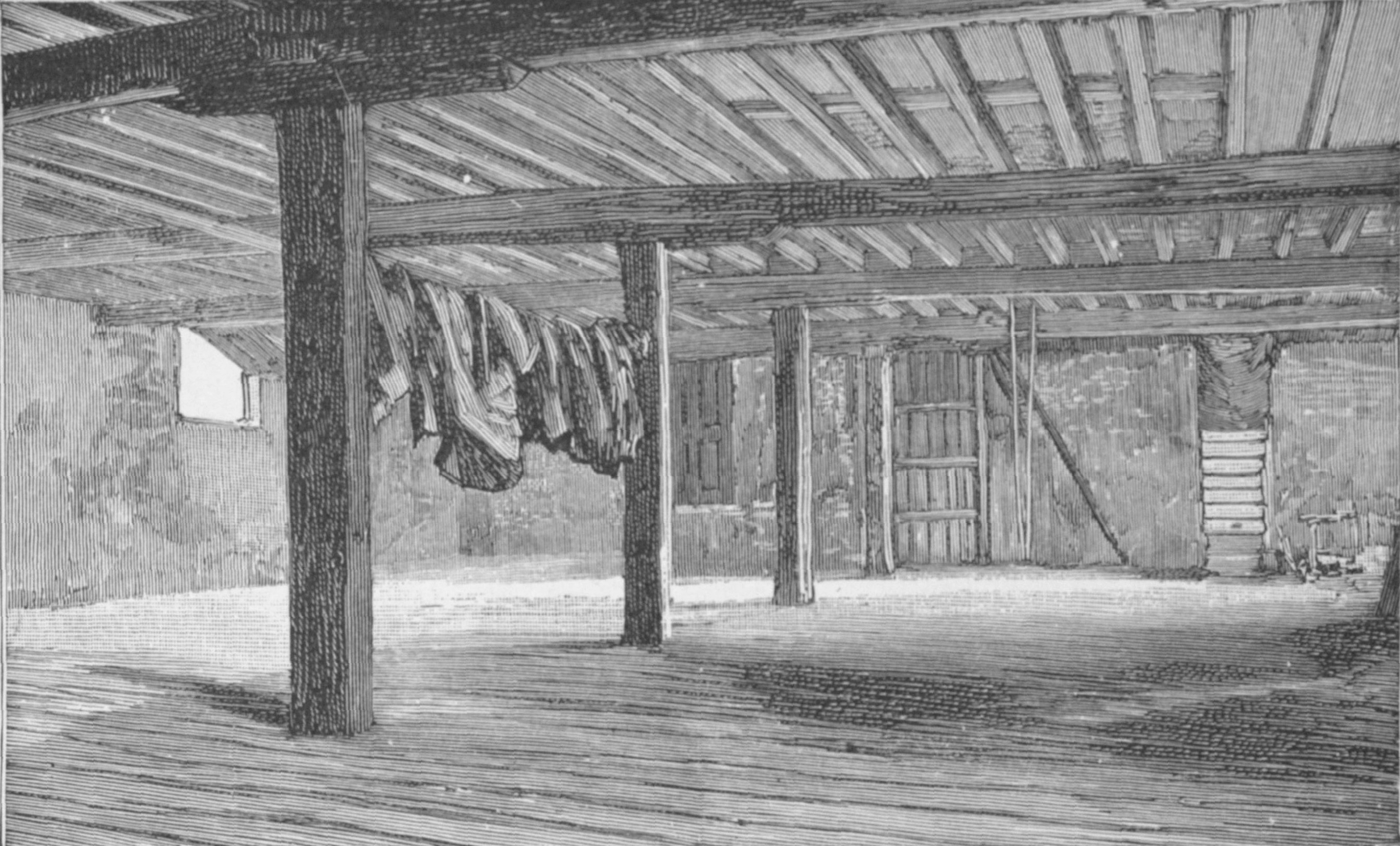
The coach house, proposed by Sir William Fraser in 1888 as the likely location of the ball

Sir William Fraser examined the site and concluded that the room proposed as the ballroom by Lady de Ros was too small a space for the number of people who attended the ball. A short time after his visit, he wrote a letter to The Times which was published on 25 August 1888. He reported that he had likely discovered the room and that it was not part of the principal property that the Duke of Richmond had rented on the Rue des Cendres, but was a coach house that backed onto the property and had an address in the next street, the Rue de la Blanchisserie. The room had dimensions of 120 feet (37 m) long, 54 feet (16 m) broad, and about 13 feet (4.0 m) high (the low ceiling was a case where reality impinged on one meaning of Lord Byron's artistic allusion to "that high hall").

Research by lawyer P. Duvivier and published by Fleischman and Aerts in their 1956 book Bruxelles pendant la bataille de Waterloo put forward an alternative theory. It proposes that, unknown to Fraser, the coach house used as a ballroom had been demolished by the time of his investigations and that the building he assumed was the ballroom was built after 1815.

== List of invitations ==
The following were sent invitations to the ball: (Note: "The following list of the invited guests was given by my mother to Lord Verulam, who sent me a copy of it. Several of the officers were not present, being on duty." — Georgiana, Lady de Ros (Swinton 1893, pp. 124–132)) (Note: A number of entries have been adjusted using the list provided by the Royal Armouries 2015. The adjustments includes assigning ranks and regiments to those present as well as casualties.)

- General Prince of Orange (wounded at Waterloo)
- Prince Frederic of Orange-Nassau
- Duke of Brunswick (killed at Quatre-Bras)
- Prince of Nassau-Weilburg
- Duc d'Arenberg
- Prince Auguste d'Arenberg
- Prince Pierre d'Arenberg
- Baron Joseph van der Linden d'Hooghvorst (Mayor of Brussels)
- Duc and Duchesse de Beaufort-Spontin, and their daughter
- Duc and Duchesse d'Ursel
- Marquis and Marquise d'Assche (Note: Lady de Ros annotated her list with this comment "(from their house we saw the wounded brought in: Lord Uxbridge, Lord F. Somerset, etc.)" (Swinton 1893, p. 125))
- Comte and Comtesse d'Oultremont
- Comtesse Douairière d'Oultremont, and her daughters (Note: Dowager Countess Anne-Henriette d'Oultremont (née de Neuf; 1757–1830) was the mother of Count Emile d'Oultremont (Miller 2005, pp. 76–77))
- Comte and Comtesse de Liedekerke-Beaufort
- Comte and Comtesse de La Tour du Pin (Note: In the de Ros guest list "La Tour Du Pin" was misspelt "Latour Lupin")
- Comte and Comtesse de Mercy-Argenteau
- Comte and Comtesse de Grasiac
- Comte de Belgade
- Comte de la Rochefoucauld
- Comtesse de Luiny
- Comtesse de Ruilly
- Baron and Baroness d'Hooghvorst, and their son and daughter
- Baron and Baroness van der Capellen
- Baron de Herelt
- Baron de Tuybe
- Baron Brockhausen
- Lieutenant-General Carlo Pozzo di Borgo (Russian envoy; wounded)
- General Karl von Vincent (Austrian envoy; wounded at Waterloo)
- Lieutenant-General Miguel Ricardo de Álava (Spanish ambassador to The Hague)
- General d'Oudenarde
- Colonel Ducayler
- Colonel Tripp, ADC
- Colonel Jakob von Washington
- Major Ronnchenberg, ADC
- Captain de Lubeck, ADC to the Duke of Brunswick
- Field-Marshal Duke of Wellington
- Lieutenant-General Earl of Uxbridge (commanded the cavalry; lost a leg at Waterloo)
- Lieutenant-Colonel Earl of Portarlington, 23rd Light Dragoons
- Captain Earl of March, 52nd Foot, ADC to the Prince of Orange (Note: Eldest son of the hosts of the ball, the Duke and Duchess of Richmond)
- Earl and Countess Conyngham, and their children Viscount Mount Charles, Hon. Francis Conyngham and Lady Elizabeth Conyngham (Note: Lady Elizabeth married Charles Gordon, 10th Marquess of Huntly (Bulloch 1902, p. 42))
- Countess of Mountnorris, and her stepdaughter Lady Juliana Maxwell-Barry (Note: Lady Frances Wedderburn-Webster and Lady John Somerset, also present at the ball, were Lady Mountnorris's daughters)
- Dowager Countess Waldegrave
- Viscountess Hawarden
- Lieutenant-General Lord Hill (commanded the II Corps)
- Lord Rendlesham
- Lord Apsley
- Lady Alvanley, and her daughters Hon. Frances Arden and Hon. Katherine Arden
- Lieutenant-Colonel Lord Saltoun
- Ensign Lord Hay, ADC to Major-General Maitland (killed at Quatre Bras)
- Major-General Lord Edward Somerset (commanded the Household Brigade of Cavalry; wounded at Waterloo)
- Lieutenant-Colonel Lord FitzRoy Somerset (brother of Lord Edward; lost an arm at Waterloo) and Lady Fitzroy Somerset (Note: Niece of the Duke of Wellington) (neither were present)
- Major Lord John Somerset, ADC to the Prince of Orange (brother of Lord Edward), and Lady John Somerset
- Lieutenant-Colonel Lord Robert Manners, 10th Hussars (wounded)
- Captain Lord Charles FitzRoy, 1st Foot Guards
- Captain Lord Arthur Hill, ADC
- Lieutenant Lord George Lennox, ADC to the Duke of Wellington (brother of Earl of March) (Note: Second son of the hosts of the ball, the Duke and Duchess of Richmond)
- Lord and Lady George Seymour, and their daughter
- Lady Frances and Mr Wedderburn-Webster
- Lady Caroline and Mr Capel, and their daughter
- Lady Charlotte and Mr Greville
- Admiral Sir James Gambier
- Admiral Sir Sidney Smith and Lady Smith, and Miss Rumbolds
- Rear-Admiral Sir Pulteney Malcolm
- Lieutenant-General Sir Henry Clinton (commanded the 2nd Division) and Lady Clinton
- Lieutenant-General Sir John Elley (deputy Adjutant-General of Cavalry; wounded at Waterloo)
- Lieutenant-General Sir Thomas Picton (commanded 5th Division; killed at Waterloo)
- Major-General Sir Edward Barnes (Adjutant-General; wounded at Waterloo)
- Major-General Sir John Byng (commanded the 2nd Brigade of Guards)
- Major-General Sir James Kempt (commanded the 8th Brigade)
- Major-General Sir Denis Pack (commanded the 9th Brigade; wounded)
- Major-General Sir William Ponsonby (commanded the Union Brigade of cavalry; killed at Waterloo)
- Major-General Sir Hussey Vivian (commanded the 6th Cavalry Brigade)
- Colonel Sir Colin Campbell, ADC
- Colonel Sir William Howe De Lancey (died of wounds received at Waterloo) and Lady De Lancey (neither were present)
- Colonel Sir George Wood, Royal Artillery
- Lieutenant-Colonel Sir Andrew Barnard (commanded the 1st Battalion the 95th Foot (Rifles); wounded)
- Lieutenant-Colonel Sir Henry Bradford (wounded)
- Lieutenant-Colonel Sir Alexander Gordon, ADC (killed at Waterloo)
- Lieutenant-Colonel Sir Robert Hill (brother of Lord Hill; wounded)
- Lieutenant-Colonel Sir Thomas Hill (brother of Lord Hill)
- Lieutenant-Colonel Sir George Scovell (commanded the Staff Corps of Cavalry)
- Sir George Berkeley (Note: The Duke of Wellington's liaison officer at the Prince of Orange's headquarters (Hofschröer 2006, p. 2)) and Lady Berkeley
- Sir James Craufurd and Lady Craufurd, and their daughter
- Sir William Johnstone and Lady Johnstone
- Sir Charles Stuart (Minister at Brussels) and Mr Stuart
- Lady Sutton and Miss Sutton (Note: Lady Sutton was the widow of Sir Thomas Sutton, 1st Baronet (Miller 2005, p. 61))
- Hon. Mrs Wellesley-Pole (Note: Sister-in-law of the Duke of Wellington and mother-in-law of Lord Fitzroy Somerset)
- Colonel Hon. Frederick Ponsonby (severely wounded)
- Colonel Hon. James Hamilton Stanhope, Guards
- Colonel Hon. William Stewart (wounded)
- Hon. Colonel Abercromby, Guards (wounded)
- Hon. Colonel Acheson, Guards
- Major Hon. George Dawson (wounded)
- Major Hon. Henry Percy, ADC to the Duke of Wellington (delivered news of the victory to London along with two Imperial Eagles and dispatches)
- Captain Hon. O. Bridgeman, ADC to Lord Hill (wounded)
- Captain Hon. George Gore, 85th Foot, ADC to Sir James Kempt
- Captain Hon. Francis Russell, ADC
- Lieutenant Hon. George Cathcart, ADC to the Duke of Wellington
- Ensign Hon. Seymour Bathurst, ADC to Major-General Maitland
- Ensign Hon. Hastings Forbes (killed at Waterloo)
- Ensign Hon. John Montagu, Coldstream Guards (wounded)
- Ensign Hon. William Stopford
- Hon. Ensign Edgecombe
- Hon. Ensign Forbes
- Hon. Lionel Dawson, 18th Light Dragoons
- Hon. John Gordon
- Hon. Mr Percival
- General Francis Dundas
- Lieutenant-General George Cooke (commanded the 1st Division; lost his right arm at Waterloo)
- Major-General Frederick Adam (not present; commanded the 3rd Infantry Brigade)
- Major-General Peregrine Maitland (commanded the 1st Brigade of Guards)
- Colonel Edward Bowater, 3rd Foot Guards (wounded)
- Colonel John Cameron, 92nd Foot (killed at Quatre Bras)
- Colonel Cumming, 18th Light Dragoons
- Colonel Robert Dick, 42nd Foot (wounded)
- Colonel Fremantle, ADC
- Colonel William Fuller, 1st Dragoon Guards (killed at Waterloo)
- Colonel Felton Hervey-Bathurst, ADC
- Colonel Charles Rowan, 52nd Regiment of Foot (wounded)
- Colonel Robert Torrens, 1st West Indies Regiment
- Colonel Alexander Woodford
- Colonel Henry Wyndham, Coldstream Guards (severely wounded)
- Lieutenant-Colonel D. Barclay, 1st Foot Guards, ADC to the Duke of York and Albany
- Major Thomas Hunter Blair, 91st Foot (wounded)
- Major Chatham Horace Churchill, 1st Foot Guards, ADC to Lord Hill and QMG
- Major James Gunthorpe, 1st Foot Guards, ADC to Major-General Maitland
- Major Hamilton, 4th West Indies Regiment, ADC to Sir Edward Barnes
- Major Thomas Noel Harris, Brigade-Major to Sir Hussey Vivian (lost an arm at Waterloo)
- Captain C. Allix, 1st Foot Guards
- Captain George Bowles, Coldstream Guards
- Captain F. Dawkins, 1st Foot Guards, ADC
- Captain Disbrowe, 1st Foot Guards, ADC to Lieutenant-General Cooke
- Captain Henry Dumaresq, 9th Foot, ADC to Sir John Byng (wounded in the chest by a musket ball while delivering a dispatch to the Duke of Wellington)
- Captain James Drummond Elphinstone, 7th Hussars (taken prisoner on 17 June)
- Captain Charles Augustus FitzRoy, Royal Horse Guards
- Captain James Fraser, 7th Hussars (wounded)
- Captain John Gurwood, 10th Hussars (wounded)
- Captain Robert Bamford Hesketh, 3rd Foot Guards (wounded)
- Captain Clement Hill, 1st Foot Guards (brother of Lord Hill; wounded)
- Captain Edward Keane, 7th Hussars, ADC to Sir Hussey Vivian
- Captain D. Mackworth, 7th Foot, ADC to Lord Hill
- Captain Pakenham, Royal Artillery
- Captain A. Shakespear, 10th Hussars
- Captain C. Smyth, 95th Foot (Rifles), Brigade-Major to Sir Denis Pack (killed at Waterloo)
- Captain Henry Somerset, 18th Hussars, ADC to Lord Robert Somerset
- Captain William Verner, 7th Hussars (wounded)
- Captain H. Webster, 9th Light Dragoons
- Captain Thomas Wildman, 7th Hussars, ADC to the Earl of Uxbridge (wounded)
- Captain Charles Yorke, 52nd Foot, ADC to Major-General Adam (not present)
- Lieutenant F. Brooke, 1st Dragoon Guards (killed at Waterloo)
- Lieutenant James Robinson, 32nd Foot
- Second-Lieutenant Gustavus Hume, Royal Artillery
- Ensign David Baird, 3rd Foot Guards (wounded)
- Ensign George Fludyer, 1st Foot Guards (wounded)
- Ensign Algernon Greville, 1st Foot Guards
- Ensign William James, 3rd Foot Guards
- Ensign Henry Montagu, 3rd Foot Guards
- Cornet W. Huntley, 1st Dragoon Guards
- Mr A. F. Dawkins, 15th Hussars (wounded)
- Mr Standish O’Grady, 7th Hussars
- Mr Horace Seymour, ADC to the Earl of Uxbridge
- Mr Chad
- Mr and Mrs Greathed
- Mr Lionel Hervey (diplomat)
- Mr and Mrs Lance, and their son and daughter
- Mr Leigh
- Mr and Mrs Lloyd
- Mr Ord, and his daughters
- Dr Hyde
- Revd Samuel Briscall (Note: Revd Briscall name is spelt "Brixall" in the de Ros list (Swinton 1893, p. 132))

== Cultural influences ==
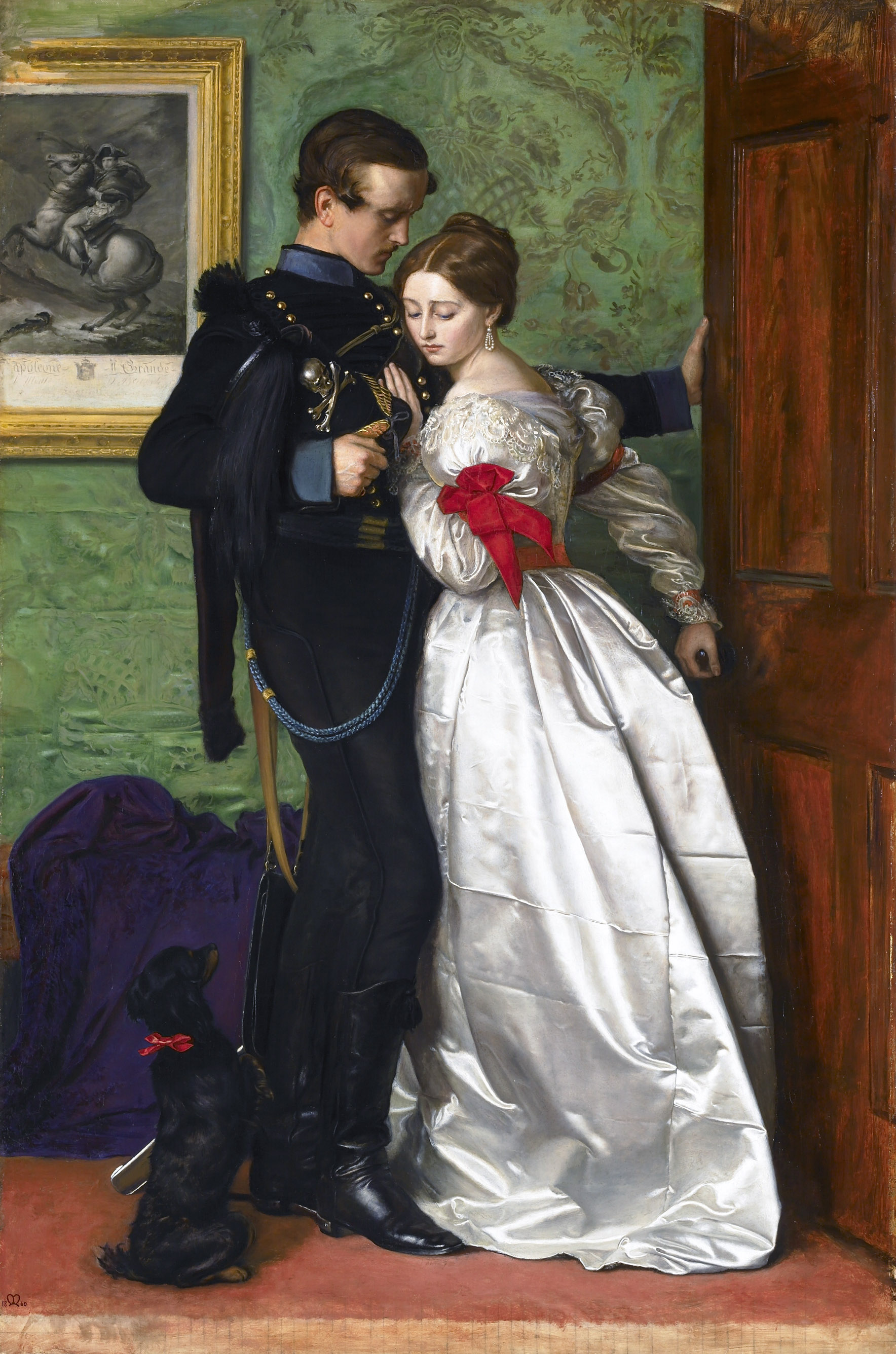
The Black Brunswicker (1860) by John Everett Millais

The ball inspired a number of writers and artists in the nineteenth century. Sir Walter Scott mentioned it in passing in Paul's Letters to his Kinsfolk. It was described by William Makepeace Thackeray in Vanity Fair and by Lord Byron in Childe Harold's Pilgrimage. Byron emphasises the contrast between the glamour of the ball and the horror of battle, concentrating on the emotional partings:

Ah! then and there was hurrying to and fro,

And gathering tears, and tremblings of distress,

And cheeks all pale, which but an hour ago

Blushed at the praise of their own loveliness;

And there were sudden partings, such as press

The life from out young hearts, and choking sighs

Which ne’er might be repeated; who could guess

If ever more should meet those mutual eyes,

Since upon night so sweet such awful morn could rise!

— Lord Byron, Childe Harold's Pilgrimage

Thackeray's dramatic use of the ball in Vanity Fair inspired, in turn, a number of screen depictions. One notable example comes from the 1935 RKO production Becky Sharp, the first full-length technicolor film released after perfection of the full-color three-strip method, which makes the Duchess of Richmond's ball the first historical set-piece ever staged in a full-colour feature film. Critics of the day were not kind to the picture itself, but the sequence in which the officers hurry to leave the ball — the red of their coats suddenly and emotionally filling the frame — was widely praised as showing great promise for the dramatic use of colour on-screen.

The ball also inspired artists, including John Everett Millais, who painted The Black Brunswicker in 1860, Henry Nelson O'Neil who painted Before Waterloo in 1868 and Robert Hillingford who painted The Duchess of Richmond's Ball.

The ball was a scene in the third act of a melodrama called In the Days of the Duke written by Charles Haddon Chambers and J. Comyns Carr; it was displayed sumptuously in the 1897 production, with a backdrop by William Harford showing the hall and staircase inside the Duchess's house.

Several characters attend the ball in Georgette Heyer's novel An Infamous Army (1937), and also in The Spanish Bride (1940), her novelisation of the life of Sir Harry Smith.

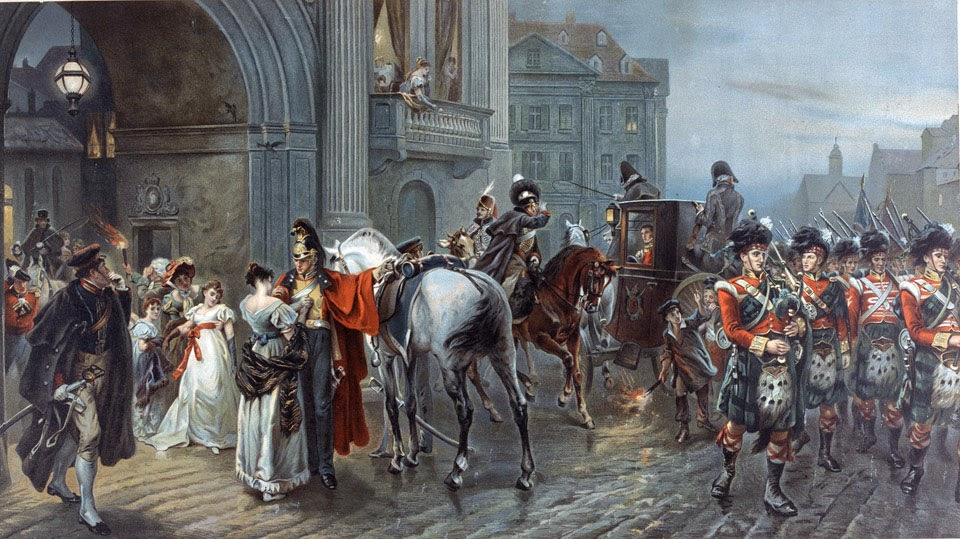
Summoned to Waterloo: Brussels, dawn of June 16, 1815 by Robert Alexander Hillingford

The ball was used by Sergei Bondarchuk in his film Waterloo (1970) for dramatic effect. Bondarchuk contrasted an army at peace with the impending battle and in particular as a dramatic backdrop to show how completely Napoleon managed to "humbug" Wellington.

In the novel Sharpe's Waterloo (1990), Bernard Cornwell uses the ball in a similar way to Bondarchuk, placing his character Richard Sharpe in the role of the aide who brings the catastrophic news to Wellington, but includes a sub-plot where Sharpe brawls with Lord John Rossendale, the lover of Sharpe's wife and a man who owes money to him.

A fictional account is given of the Duchess of Richmond's ball in The Campaigners, Volume 14 of The Morland Dynasty, a series of historical novels by author Cynthia Harrod-Eagles. Some of the fictional Morland family and other characters attend the ball and the events that unfold are seen and experienced through their eyes.

The ball serves as the backdrop for the first chapter of Julian Fellowes's 2016 novel Belgravia (adapted for television as Belgravia in 2020). The chapter is titled "Dancing into Battle", and portrays a potential mésalliance that is avoided the next day by a battlefield fatality at Quatre Bras. Fellowes incorporates into his book real events that occurred during the ball, and inserts his fictional characters into them.

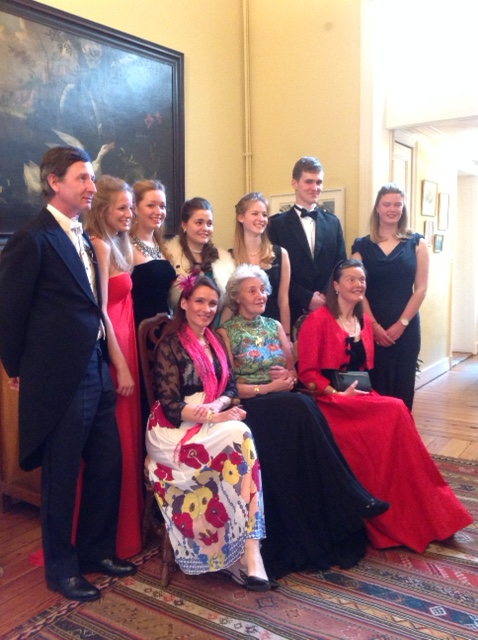
Descendants of guests at the original ball, participating in the Bicentennial Ball in 2015

On 15 June 1965, the British Ambassador in Brussels held a ball to commemorate the 150th anniversary of the Battle of Waterloo and the Duchess of Richmond's ball. 540 guests attended the function of whom the majority were Belgians. This commemoration ball has now become an annual event with the money raised going to support several charities.
