= Lord Hay =

Lord Hay may refer to:

- Earl of Erroll, a title in the Peerage of Scotland
- Marquess of Tweeddale, a title of the Peerage of Scotland
- James Hay, Lord Hay, British Army officer
- Willie Hay, Baron Hay of Ballyore (born 1950), Northern Irish politician
