= Robert Alexander Hillingford =

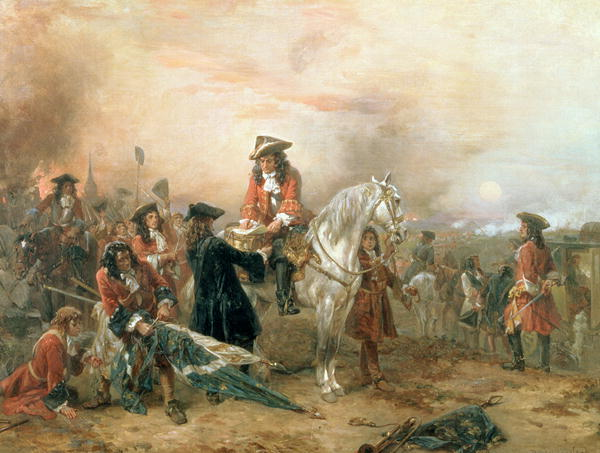
The Duke of Marlborough Signing the Despatch at Blenheim

Robert Alexander Hillingford (28 January 1828 – 1904) was an English artist who specialised in military art.

== Biography ==
He was born in London on 28 January 1828, and studied at the Kunstakademie Düsseldorf for five years beginning in 1841. He is associated with the Düsseldorf school of painting. He then traveled to Munich, Rome, Florence and Naples, where he married and worked for several years, producing paintings of Italian life. One painting from this period entitled The Last Evening of the Carnival was exhibited at St. Petersburg in 1859. He returned to London in 1864, and first exhibited at the Royal Academy in 1866; it was at this time that he began to work on historical subjects, especially of the Napoleonic Wars. He was a regular exhibitor at the Royal Academy, British Institution and at other galleries. While he was attracted to costume pieces such as An incident in the early life of Louis XIV and During the wanderings of Charles Edward Stuart, he also painted some contemporary military scenes, including his 1901 RA painting South Africa, 1901 - The Dawn of Peace.

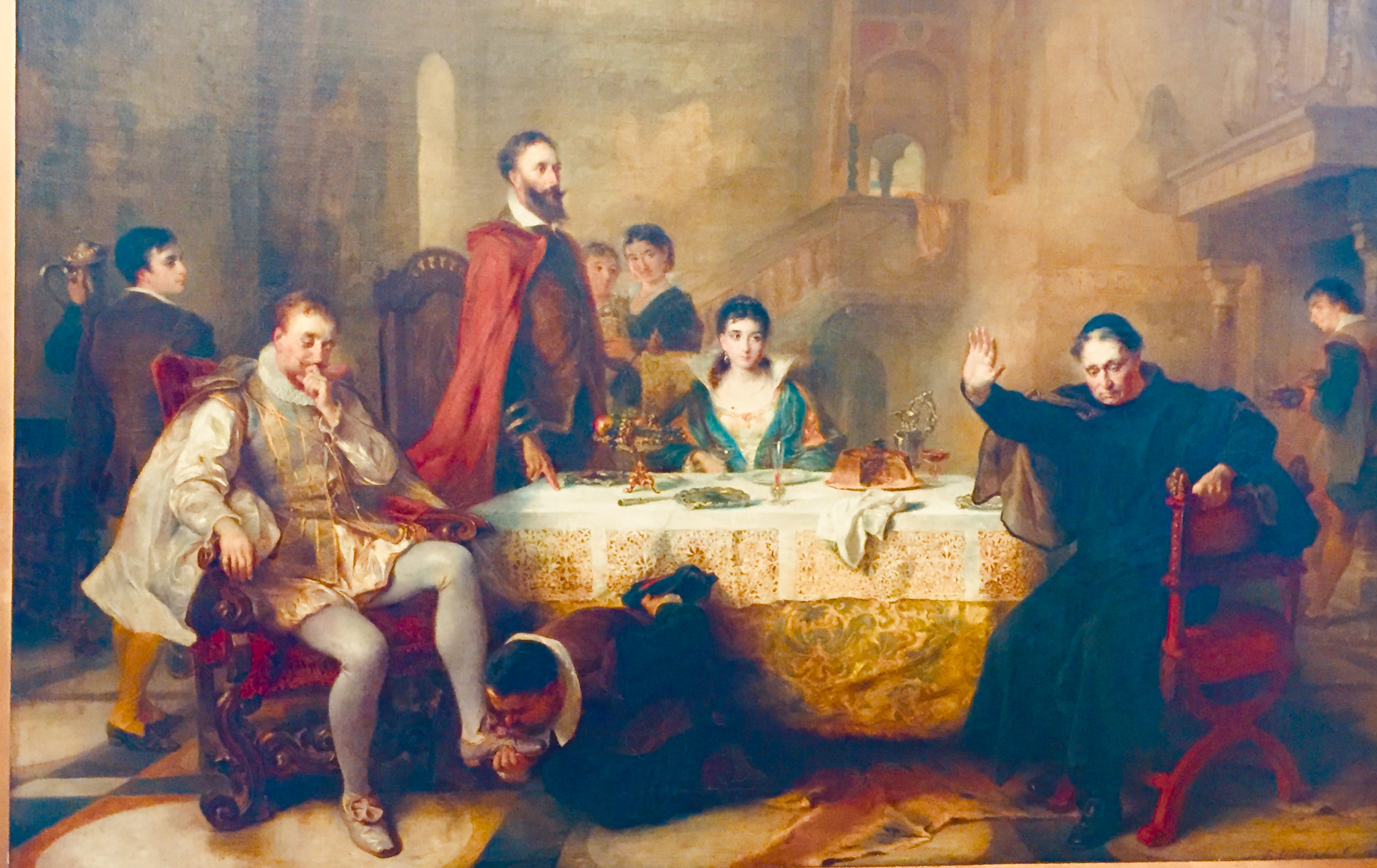
An incident from the story of Don Quixote written by Cervantes

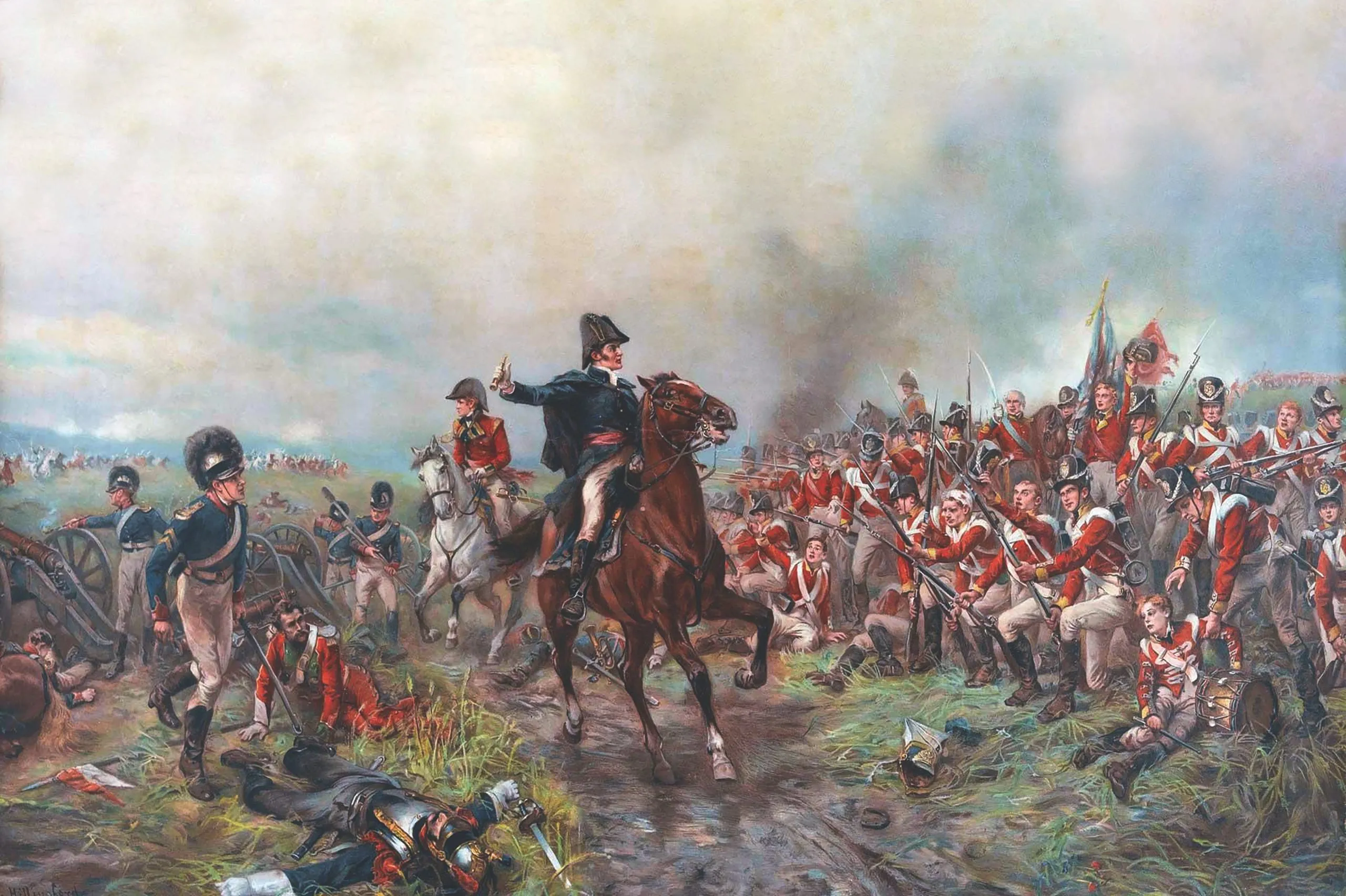
Wellington at Waterloo

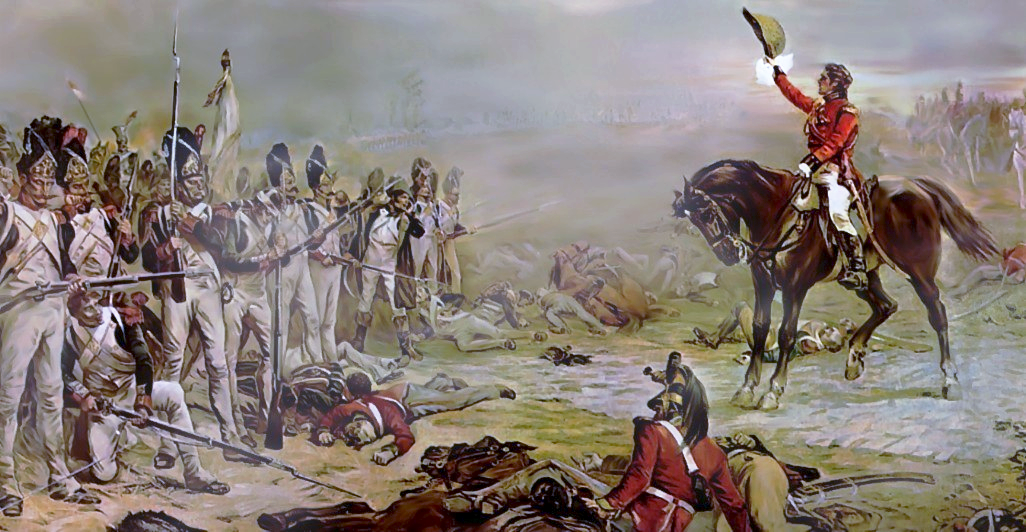
Lord Hill invites the last remnants of the French Imperial Guard to surrender

== Paintings ==
- The Duchess of Richmond's Ball (1870s – Goodwood House)
- An Incident in the story of Don Quixote by Cervantes (1879)
- Yet Still a King (1888 – Kelvingrove Art Gallery and Museum)
- Hurry up the Guns: Wellington driving the French out of Spain and into France (Queen's Royal Lancers)
- The Escape of Joseph Bonaparte, King of Spain with British troopers charging (Queen's Royal Lancers)
- Surrender: The capture of General Lefebre Desnouettes at the Ford of the Elsa at Benavente, 1809, by Pte. Luke Guisdall, 10th Hussars (Royal Hussars)
- The Duke of Marlborough saving the day at Ramillies (Queen's Royal Lancers)
- Ramillies, 23 May 1706: capture of the standards and kettledrums by the Queen's Regiment of Horse (Royal Dragoon Guards)
- The Defence of Hougoumont
- After Waterloo: The English Army halting upon what had been the French position... (1889 – Institute of Directors)
- Napoleon's peril at Brienne-le-Chateau (1891)
- The Morning of Waterloo (1896)

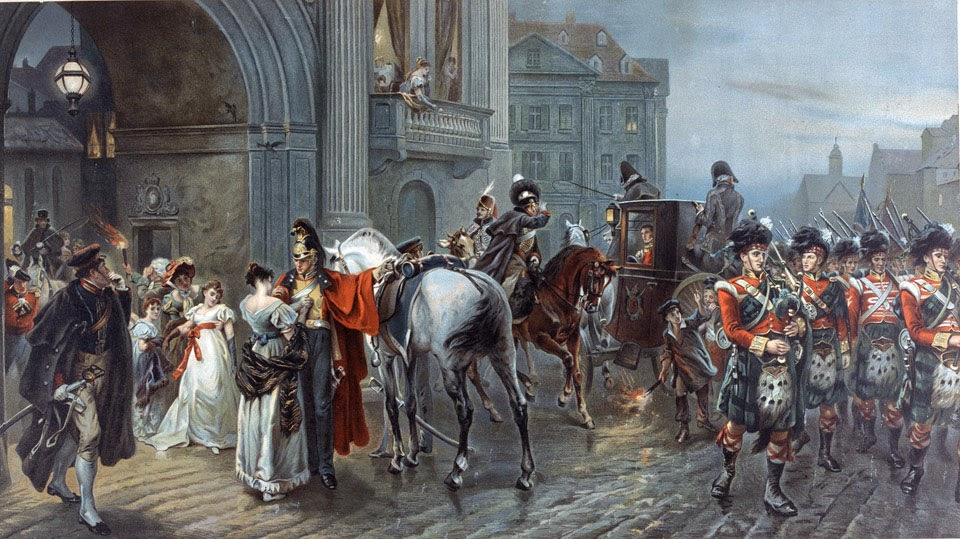
Summoned to Waterloo — depicts revellers leaving the Duchess of Richmond's ball as soldiers march out of Brussels to war

- Summoned to Waterloo: Brussels, dawn of June 16, 1815 (1898)
- Battle of Balaclava, Charge of the Light Brigade (1899)
- Sebastopol: the attack on the Redan (1899)
- Death of Sir Richard Granville, captain of the Revenge, on board the Spanish Flagship San Pablo after the Battle of Flores (1899 – Victoria Art Gallery, Bath)
- Charge of the Light Brigade (1899)
- The Scots Greys among the French Guns at Waterloo (1899 – Royal Scots Dragoon Guards)
- A critical moment at Quatre Bras (1900)
- The flight of the French through the town of Vittoria: Peninsular War (1900)
- South Africa, 1901: The Dawn of Peace. (1901)
- George II at Dettingen (1902)
