= Listed buildings in Petton =

Petton is a civil parish in Shropshire, England. It contains four listed buildings that are recorded in the National Heritage List for England. Of these, one is at Grade II*, the middle of the three grades, and the others are at Grade II, the lowest grade. The parish contains the village of Petton and the surrounding countryside, and the listed buildings consist of a farmhouse, a church, the churchyard walls and gate, and an ice house.

== Key ==
Grade	Criteria
II*	Particularly important buildings of more than special interest
II	Buildings of national importance and special interest

== Buildings ==
Name and location	Photograph	Date	Notes	Grade
Wackley Farmhouse; 52.83958°N 2.81990°W	—	Late 17th century	The farmhouse was exztended in the 18th and 19th centuries. It is in red brick with floor bands and a slate roof. There is a T-shaped plan, consisting of four-bay range with two storeys and an attic, and a two-storey gabled range at the rear. On the front is a porch and a doorway with a semicircular fanlight, and the windows are casements.	II
Petton Church; 52.83301°N 2.83457°W		1727	The church was restored, and the porch and bellcote were added, in 1870, and it was further restored in 1896. The church is built in red brick on a stepped plinth, and has a slate roof with lozenge-shaped patterns. It consists of a nave and a chancel in one cell, a north vestry, and a south porch. The porch is gabled with a finial, and the square bellcote on the west gable end has a pyramidal roof and a brass weathercock. The windows have round-arched heads, and the doorway has an elliptical arch.	II*
Churchyard wall and gate 52.83311°N 2.83515°W	—	c. 1727	The wall encloses the north, west, and part of the south sides of the churchyard. It is in red brick with sandstone coping, and is ramped to the corners. The gate dates from 1910, it is in wrought iron, and has elaborate floral motifs. To the north is a stone stile.	II
Ice house 52.83062°N 2.83132°W	—	Late 18th or early 19th century (probable)	The ice house is in red brick, and lies under a mound of earth. It consists of a short segmental-headed tunnel leading to an egg-shaped cavity.	II
