= English Frankton =

Coordinates: 52.864°N 2.816°W

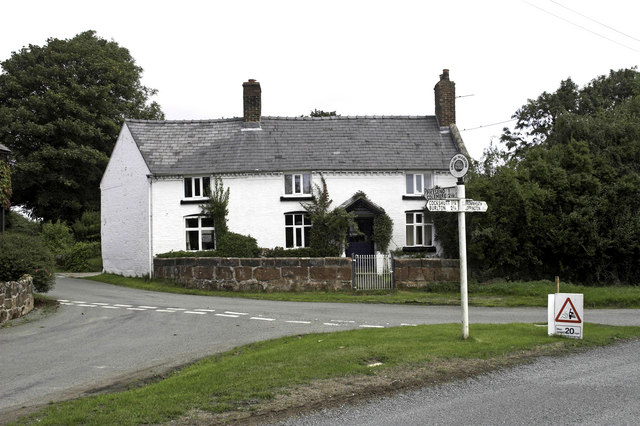
- Finger post in English Frankton

- Location within Shropshire
- OS grid reference: SJ450299
- Civil parish: Cockshutt
- Unitary authority: Shropshire
- Ceremonial county: Shropshire
- Region: West Midlands
- Country: England
- Sovereign state: United Kingdom
- Post town: ELLESMERE
- Postcode district: SY12
- Dialling code: 01939
- Police: West Mercia
- Fire: Shropshire
- Ambulance: West Midlands
- UK Parliament: North Shropshire

English Frankton, formerly known simply as Frankton, is a small village in Shropshire, England. It lies between the villages of Cockshutt and Loppington, in the civil parish of Cockshutt, and south-east of Ellesmere.

The name Frankton probably originated as "Francas's field". It was recorded in Domesday Book as Franchetone, when it was held by Rainald the Sheriff from Earl Roger. Domesday also noted that the manor contained one carruca, along with three villeins and two bordarii.

== See also ==
- Welsh Frankton
- Lower Frankton
