= Cockshutt, Shropshire =

Village and civil parish in England

Coordinates: 52.857°N 2.840°W

Cockshutt
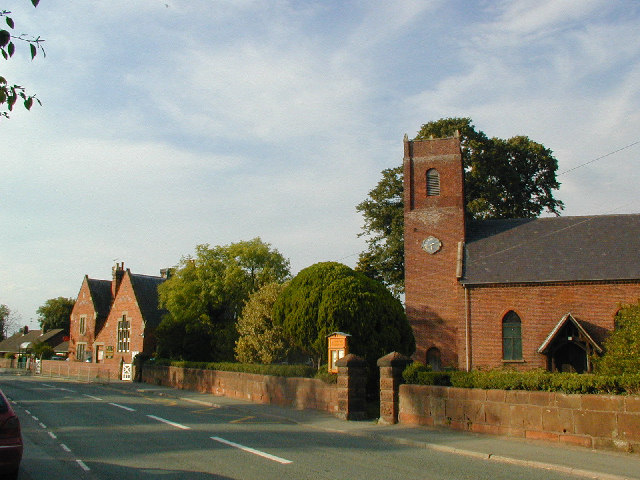
- Cockshutt village

- Location within Shropshire
- Population: 787 (2011)
- OS grid reference: SJ434292
- Civil parish: Cockshutt
- Unitary authority: Shropshire
- Ceremonial county: Shropshire
- Region: West Midlands
- Country: England
- Sovereign state: United Kingdom
- Post town: ELLESMERE
- Postcode district: SY12
- Dialling code: 01939
- Police: West Mercia
- Fire: Shropshire
- Ambulance: West Midlands
- UK Parliament: North Shropshire

Cockshutt is a village and civil parish in Shropshire, England.

== Cockshutt-cum-Petton ==
Cockshutt-cum-Petton is the name of the combined parish council of the two historic, single-village parishes of Cockshutt and Petton. These two villages, as well as the hamlet of English Frankton, make up the main settlements of Cockshutt-cum-Petton. There are then a number of individual houses and farms. The parish council meets at Cockshutt Millennium Hall. The 2001 Census recorded a population of 676, in 264 households, the 2011 census recording a population of 787 in 305 households.

== Village Hall ==
The Millennium Hall made media headlines in Shropshire when it opened in 1997 as it was the first village hall in the county to receive a large grant from the then newly formed Millennium Commission. The grant was secured as a result of a two-year fundraising drive by villagers, led by hall chairman Arthur Sydney Davies.

The Millennium Hall was back in the media in June 2006 when Oswestry graphic designer and filmmaker Kevin Taylor released a DVD documentary telling the story of the Hall's origins. Copies of the film entitled, Once In A Lifetime were sold to raise funds for the Millennium Hall. Information about the film can be found at Fabmo Design

== Recent history ==
On 11 June 2005 Arthur Sydney Davies became the first villager to be honoured when he was made an MBE "for services to the community in Cockshutt, Shropshire."

In May 2007 a book about the history of the village was launched. Cockshutt & Petton Remembered was produced by the Cockshutt Parish History Group.

2008 saw the launch of the village's own website, Cockshutt Village.Com. The site is a local portal for villagers and features news and events in and around Cockshutt.

== See also ==
- Listed buildings in Cockshutt, Shropshire
