= Listed buildings in Cockshutt, Shropshire =

Cockshutt is a civil parish in Shropshire, England. The parish contains 20 listed buildings that are recorded in the National Heritage List for England. All the listed buildings are designated at Grade II, the lowest of the three grades, which is applied to "buildings of national importance and special interest". The parish contains the village of Cockshutt and the surrounding countryside. Most of the listed buildings are houses, cottages, farmhouses and farm buildings, a high proportion of which are timber framed. The other listed buildings are a public house and a church with a sundial and memorials in the churchyard, including a war memorial.

== Buildings ==
Name and location	Photograph	Date	Notes
7 Shrewsbury Road; 52.85797°N 2.84211°W		Late 15th century	A timber framed cottage, partly of cruck construction, with brick infill, partly rendered on a rendered plinth, and with a thatched roof. There is one storey and an attic, two bays, and a single-story rendered extension to the left with a hipped roof. On the front is a casement window, a fixed window and a gabled eaves dormer. Inside is a large inglenook fireplace.
Shade Oak Farmhouse; 52.84343°N 2.87562°W		Early 17th century (probable)	The farmhouse was extended later in the 17th century, and there have been later alterations. The original part is timber framed with brick infill, and the farmhouse has been largely encased in brick and painted to resemble timber framing at the front, and it is rendered at the rear. The roof is slated, and there are two storeys and attics. The left return has a jetty and a moulded bressumer. Most of the windows are sashes, with segmental heads in the ground floor, and in the attics are casement windows.
Barn southeast of The Hollies; 52.86162°N 2.81205°W	—	Early 17th century	The barn is timber framed and weatherboarded on a sandstone plinth, it is partly clad in corrugated iron, and has an asbestos sheet roof. The barn contains a threshing entrance and eaves hatches.
36 Shrewsbury Road; 52.85350°N 2.83904°W	—	Mid to late 17th century	A timber framed cottage with brick infill on a rendered stone plinth, and with a thatched roof. There is one storey and an attic, two bays, and a red brick outbuilding at the right rear corner. The windows are casements with lattice glazing.
Barn northeast of The Quaikin; 52.87266°N 2.81117°W	—	Mid to late 17th century	The barn is timber framed and weatherboarded, and has a corrugated iron roof. It has an L-shaped plan, and contains openings, including doorways and hatches.
32 Shrewsbury Road; 52.85561°N 2.84027°W	—	Late 17th century (probable)	A farmhouse, later a private house, it is timber framed with roughcast infill, and was refaced at the front and left gable end in red brick in the 18th century. The roof is slated, there are two storeys and an attic, and two bays. The windows are casements with segmental heads.
Crosemere Hall and wall 52.85802°N 2.83512°W		Late 17th century (probable)	A farmhouse that was later remodelled and extended, it is in red brick on a chamfered and stepped plinth, with a band and a hipped tile roof. The house has an L-shaped plan, two storeys and attics, and a garden front of five bays. The windows vary; there are cross-windows, sashes, casements, dormers, and a French window. Attached to the house is a garden wall in red brick with sandstone coping, buttressed on the outside.
Crown Hotel; 52.85586°N 2.84056°W	—	Late 17th century	A house, later a public house, it is timber framed with rendered and brick infill on a sandstone plinth, and it has been largely rebuilt in brick. There are two storeys, a main range of three bays, and a lower range to the left of two bays. The windows are casements, those in the ground floor with segmental heads. There are stables to the left of the lower range, and extensions to the rear of the main range.
Rosemary Cottage; 52.86040°N 2.83872°W	—	Late 17th century	A timber framed cottage with red brick infill and a thatched roof. It has one storey and an attic, two bays, and a brick lean-to at the rear. On the front is a gabled porch, the windows are casements, and in the attic is a straight eyebrow eaves dormer with two casements.
Span Cottage; 52.86585°N 2.82486°W	—	Late 17th century	The cottage is timber framed with red brick infill on a chamfered sandstone plinth and has a slate roof. There is a later byre attached to the right end. The cottage has one storey and an attic, the windows are casements, and there are later gabled eaves dormers. At each end are 19th-century brick lean-tos.
Mere Farmhouse; 52.86295°N 2.84296°W	—	1733	The farmhouse is in red brick with a dentilled eaves cornice and a slate roof. It has one storey and an attic, and a short rear range. The windows are casements with segmental heads, and above are gabled eaves dormers.
Barn southwest of Lower Farmhouse; 52.86140°N 2.81081°W	—	c. 1700	The barn is timber framed and weatherboarded on a red sandstone plinth and has an asbestos sheet roof. It contains doorways and five eaves hatches.
The Red Lion; 52.85621°N 2.84048°W		Mid to late 18th century	A farmhouse, later a public house, it is in brick on a chamfered plinth, and has a slate roof. There is a T-shaped plan, the main part with two storeys, a cellar and an attic, and three bays, sash windows, and three gabled roof dormers. To the rear is a two-storey range in sandstone, and a further single-storey extension. (Note: Street View in May 2011 shows that the name of the public house has been changed to The Leaking Tap.)
Lower Farmhouse; 52.86144°N 2.81028°W	—	Late 18th century	The farmhouse is in red brick with a dentilled eaves cornice and a hipped slate roof. There are three storeys, three bays, and a lower service range at the rear. The windows in the lower two floors are sashes with segmental heads, and in the top floor they are casements.
Sundial; 52.85734°N 2.84082°W	—	Late 18th century (probable)	The sundial is in the churchyard of the Church of St Simon and St Jude. It is in limestone, and consists of a vase-shaped baluster with a moulded plinth and capping, and it has a brass plate and gnomon.
Church of St Simon and St Jude; 52.85748°N 2.84083°W		1777	The church was restored in 1886–87 when the porch and vestry were added. It is in red brick and has roofs of slate with coped verges. The church consists of a nave with a timber south porch, a polygonal apsidal chancel with a north vestry, and a west tower. The tower has three unequal stages, the top stage recessed with corner pilasters rising to small pyramidal pinnacles. Between them is a plain parapet with similar pinnacles at the midpoints. The windows in the tower are round-headed, and in the body of the church they have pointed heads.
Burlton memorial and enclosure 52.85740°N 2.84077°W	—	c. 1819	The memorial is in the churchyard of the Church of St Simon and St Jude, and is to the memory of members of the Burlton family. It is a pedestal tomb in limestone, and has a moulded plinth and capping, an urn finial, and moulded inscription panels with a fluted cornice above. The memorial stands in an enclosure with twisted cast iron railings.
Burlton memorial and enclosure 52.85737°N 2.84073°W	—	c. 1822	The memorial is in the churchyard of the Church of St Simon and St Jude, and is to the memory of members of the Burlton family. It is a chest tomb in limestone, and has a rectangular shape with tapering ends. The tomb has a moulded plinth on ball feet, a chamfered top with a brass plaque, and moulded inscription panels. There is a broken urn-shaped finial. The memorial stands in an enclosure with cast iron railings.
Phillips memorial 52.85753°N 2.84076°W	—	c. 1838	The memorial is in the churchyard of the Church of St Simon and St Jude, and is to the memory of two members of the Phillips family. It is a chest tomb in limestone, and has a rectangular shape with tapering ends. The tomb has a moulded plinth on ball feet, fluted corner piers, a chamfered top with a broken finial, and moulded inscription panels.
War memorial 52.85718°N 2.84087°W		1920	The war memorial is in the churchyard of the Church of St Simon and St Jude. It is in Cornish grey granite, and consists of a Celtic wheel-cross on a tapering rectangular shaft. This stands on a two-stepped plinth, on a two-stepped base with chamfered corners. On the head of the cross is relief moulded knot work, and a domed circular centre. The plinth has an inscription and the names of those lost in the First World War, and there is a granite table with another inscription and the names of those lost in the Second World War.

== Notes and references ==
=== Sources ===
- Historic England, "No. 7 Shrewsbury Road, Cockshutt (1307934)", National Heritage List for England
- Historic England, "Shade Oak Farmhouse, Cockshutt (1055946)", National Heritage List for England
- Historic England, "Barn approximately 15 metres south-east of The Hollies, Cockshutt (1055948)", National Heritage List for England
- Historic England, "No. 36 Shrewsbury Road, Cockshutt (1366539)", National Heritage List for England
- Historic England, "L-shaped barn approximately 10 metres north-east of The Quaikin, Cockshutt (1176253)", National Heritage List for England
- Historic England, "No. 32 Shrewsbury Road, Cockshutt (1366521)", National Heritage List for England
- Historic England, "Crosemere Hall and attached garden wall, Cockshutt (1055947)", National Heritage List for England
- Historic England, "Crown Hotel, Cockshutt (1176336)", National Heritage List for England
- Historic England, "Rosemary Cottage, Cockshutt (1366518)", National Heritage List for England
- Historic England, "Span Cottage, Cockshutt (1176262)", National Heritage List for England
- Historic England, "Mere Farmhouse, Cockshutt (1176278)", National Heritage List for England
- Historic England, "Barn approximately 20 metres south-west of Lower Farmhouse Cockshutt (1366519)", National Heritage List for England
- Historic England, "The Red Lion, Cockshutt (1055951)", National Heritage List for England
- Historic England, "Lower Farmhouse, Cockshutt (1176281)", National Heritage List for England
- Historic England, "Sundial approximately 12 metres south of nave of Church of St. Simon and St. Jude, Cockshutt (1055949)", National Heritage List for England
- Historic England, "Church of St. Simon and St. Jude, Cockshutt (1307924)", National Heritage List for England
- Historic England, "Burlton memorial and railed enclosure approximately 2 metres south of nave of Church of St. Simon and St. Jude, Cockshutt (1055950)", National Heritage List for England
- Historic England, "Burlton memorial and railed enclosure approximately 5 metres south of chancel of Church of St. Simon and St. Jude, Cockshutt (1307929)", National Heritage List for England
- Historic England, "Phillips memorial approximately 1 metre north of vestry of Church of St. Simon and St. Jude, Cockshutt (1366520)", National Heritage List for England
- Historic England, "Cockshutt war memorial, Cockshutt (1464146)", National Heritage List for England
- Historic England, Listed Buildings
- Newman, John; Pevsner, Nikolaus (2006), Shropshire, The Buildings of England, New Haven and London: Yale University Press, ISBN 0-300-12083-4
