= Combat of Navas de Membrillo =

1811 battle of the Peninsular War

- Part of the Peninsular War
Date	29 December 1811
Location	Near Mérida, Spain 38°54′N 6°20′W
Result	French victory

Belligerents
(First French Empire) France	(United Kingdom of Great Britain and Ireland) United Kingdom

Commanders and leaders
(First French Empire) Captain Neveux	(United Kingdom of Great Britain and Ireland) Rowland Hill

Strength
c. 400	Unknown

Casualties and losses
2 killed 9 wounded	3 killed 36–37 wounded

Peninsular War
Castile 1811–13
current battle

The combat of Navas de Membrillo took place on 29 December 1811 near Mérida, Spain, and saw the British light cavalry of General Rowland Hill assault a small Imperial French force led by Captain Neveux. During the action, the French soldiers formed in square inflicted a sharp defeat to the British cavalrymen. This engagement is considered by historian Ian Fletcher as "one of the more disappointing cavalry episodes in the Peninsula".

== Background ==
On the last days of 1812, Arthur Wellesley, Viscount Wellington, commander-in-chief of the Anglo-Portuguese army, wanted to distract the French forces commanded by Marshal Jean-de-Dieu Soult, which were occupied by the Siege of Tarifa. Thus, he asked Major-General Rowland Hill to lead a raid against the French 5th Infantry Division of General Ludwik Mateusz Dembowski located at Mérida. Hill went to Spain with 12,000 men on December 27 and reached the village of La Rocca at 30 kilometers of Mérida the next day. At the same time and looking for food supplies, a small French force advanced in this direction. This force was made up of three companies of the French 88th Infantry Regiment under Captain Neveux and a detachment of hussars, for a total of around 400 men.

== Battle ==
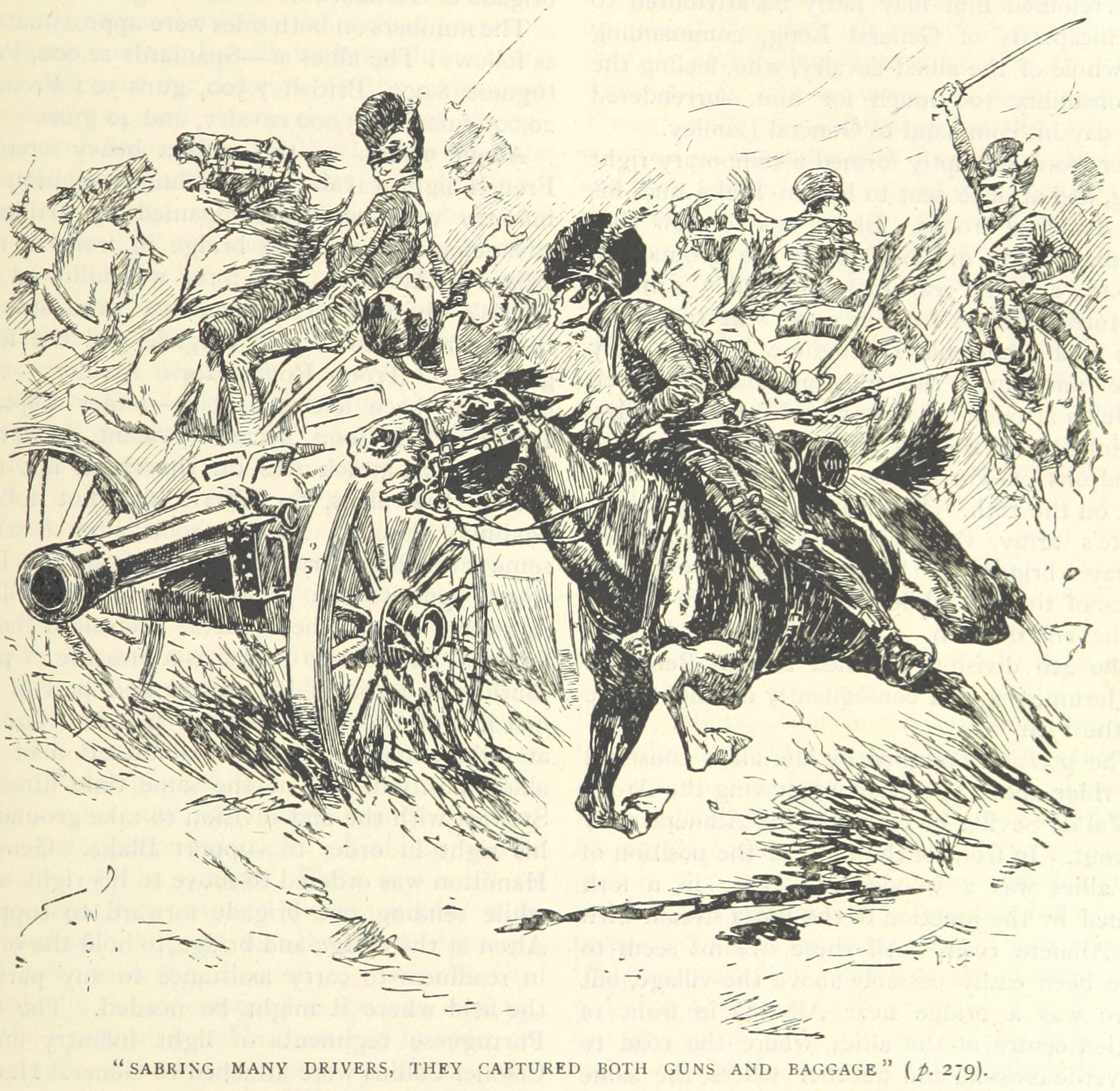
The 13th Light Dragoons at the Battle of Albuera

On 29 December, Hill's vanguard fell on the detachment of French hussars near the village of Navas de Membrillo. The hussars quickly informed Captain Neveux who decided to retreat towards Mérida. Seeing this movement, Hill, without infantry support, ordered his cavalry to pursue and capture the fleeing French.

The 2nd Hussars Regiment of the King's German Legion and two squadrons of the 13th Light Dragoons charged Neveux's troop, but the French formed a square in a wood and the attackers were put in disorder by the cork trees which protected the Imperial soldiers. Disorganized, the British light cavalry was repulsed five times by the well-directed fire of the French square. Neveux's men then managed to withdraw towards Mérida, despite the action of the British artillery which arrived on the scene at the end of the engagement.

== Aftermath ==
The British suffered three killed and 37 wounded: 20 casualties in each of their two regiments. Another source gives 36 wounded. The French had lost only two killed and nine wounded under the fire of the British artillery, and none against their cavalry. Hill was disgruntled by this setback because it deprived him of any chance of success for the rest of the expedition. Nevertheless, when he was informed of Hill's approach, General Dembowski decided to evacuate Mérida and join with Marshal Soult in Andalusia. Hill occupied the city shortly after and continued to progress through Spanish territory, before he returned in Portugal.

The combat of Navas de Membrillo was considered by historian Ian Fletcher, from the British point of view, "as one of the more disappointing cavalry episodes in the Peninsula". He compared this action with the combat of Barquilla (or Villar de Puerco), fight in July 1810 in similar conditions (unsuccessful cavalry charge against infantry formed in square). In the specific case of Navas de Membrillo, the good use of the ground by the French, Captain Neveux's skill and the strong discipline of his soldiers led to a British defeat, Fletcher however didn't question at all the behaviour of the British cavalrymen "who could not really have been expected to perform any better than they did".
