= Robert Chambre Hill =

British Army cavalry officer (1778–1860)

Sir Robert Chambre Hill, CB (25 March 1778 – 5 March 1860) was a British Army cavalry officer who fought in the Peninsular War and was wounded while in command of the Royal Horse Guards at the Battle of Waterloo in 1815.

== Background ==
He was born on 25 March 1778 at Hawkstone Hall near Prees, Shropshire, the fourth son of Sir John Hill, 3rd Baronet, a Shropshire farmer and landowner, and Mary, daughter and co-heir to John Chambré of Petton, Shropshire. One of his elder brothers was Rowland, later Viscount Hill.

== Career ==
Educated at Rugby School from 1788, Hill was appointed a cornet in the 6th Dragoons on 29 July 1795. Promotion to lieutenant followed on 26 August 1796 and to captain on 15 June 1804. He then transferred as a major to the Royal Horse Guards (Blues) on 15 November 1805 and received his brevet promotion to lieutenant-colonel on 1 January 1819.

He commanded the Blues during the Peninsular War and led a brigade of cavalry at the 1813 Battle of Vitoria, for which he received the Army Gold Medal. At Waterloo, Hill, while a commander of the Royal Horse Guards, was wounded when a musket ball entered his right shoulder and passed through his arm. Despite the injury, Hill remained on the battlefield until close to the completion of the action.

For his services in the battle he was made a Companion of the Order of the Bath (CB), a Knight of the Russian Order of St. George of the Fourth Class, and a Knight of the Austrian Order of Maria Theresa.

He was knighted by the Prince Regent on 29 May 1812 as a proxy for his brother, Rowland, who was already a Knight Companion of the Order of the Bath.

Hill later became Deputy Lieutenant of Shropshire, a magistrate for the Wem and Whitchurch divisions, and a Commissioner of Income and Property Taxes for the latter.

== Family ==
Robert Hill married Eliza Lumley, daughter of Henry Lumley, on 5 February 1801, and they had the following children:

- George Stavely Hill (born 1801), married Jane Borough, daughter of Thomas Borough, in 1832
- Captain Alfred Edward Hill (born 19 March 1810), married a daughter of the Earl of Kilmorey on 9 April 1839
- Lieutenant-Colonel Percy Hill (born 24 December 1817), married Harriet Cecilia Steuart, daughter of Captain John Steuart; served 95th Regiment of Foot (Rifles)
- Mary Julia Hill

His younger brothers Clement and Thomas also followed military careers; they were all present at the Battle of Waterloo, along with their elder brother, Lord Hill.
