= Clement Delves Hill =

British Army officer (1781–1845)

Major-General Clement Delves Hill
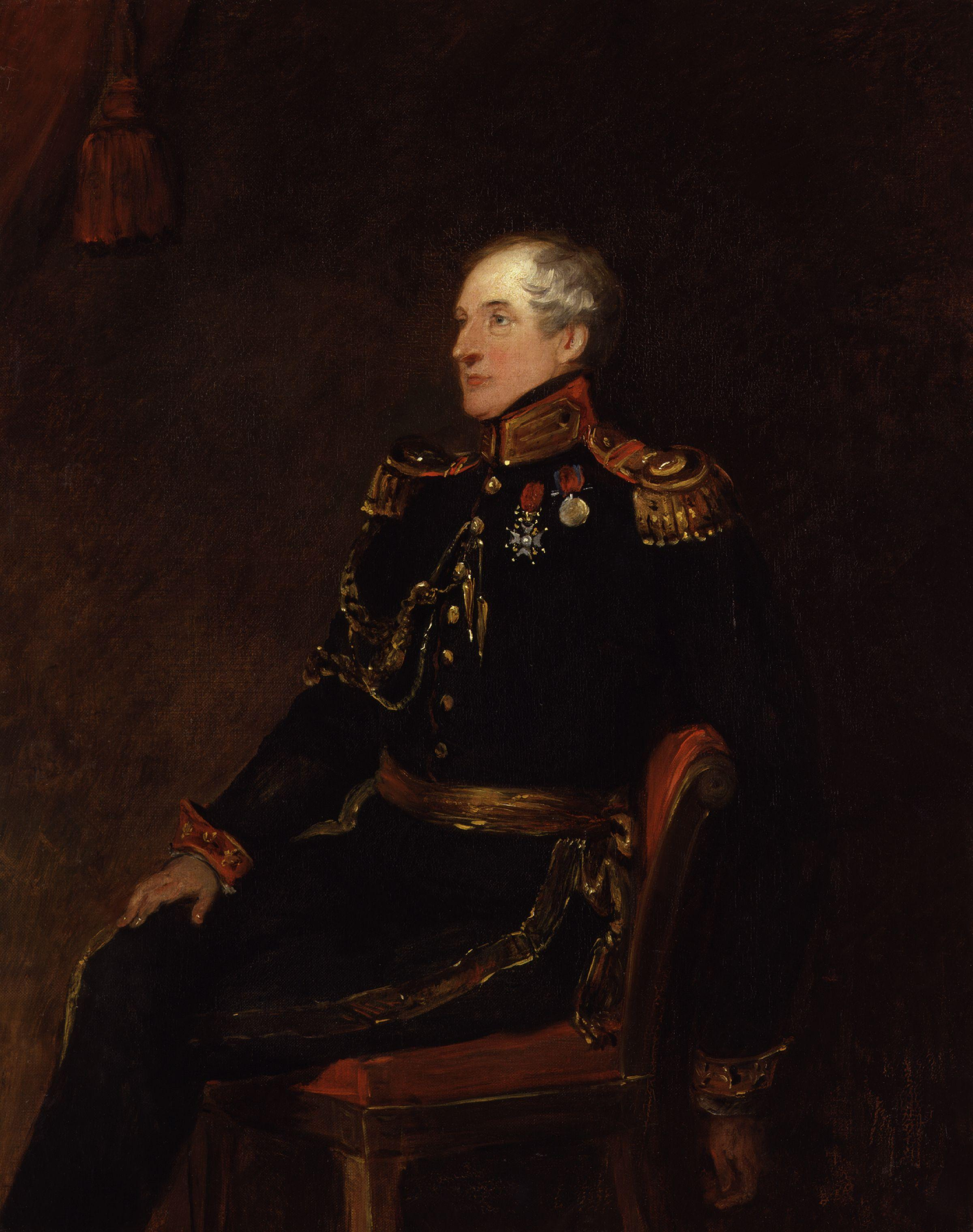
- Portrait by William Salter
- Born: 6 December 1781; Hawkstone Hall, Shropshire, England
- Died: 20 January 1845 (aged 63); Karnataka, British India
- Relatives: Rowland Hill, 1st Viscount Hill (elder brother); Sir Robert Hill (elder brother); Sir Thomas Hill (younger brother)
- Military career
- Allegiance: United Kingdom
- Branch: British Army
- Service years: 1805–1841
- Rank: Major-General
- Conflicts: Peninsular War; Hundred Days

Major-General Clement Delves Hill (6 December 1781 – 20 January 1845) was a British Army officer who fought at the Battle of Waterloo in 1815 and later saw service in India.

== Career ==
The sixth son of Sir John Hill, 3rd Baronet, and Mary, co-heir and daughter of John Chambré of Petton, Shropshire, he was born on 6 December 1781 at Hawkstone Hall near Prees, Shropshire.

He joined the Royal Horse Guards (Blues) as a cornet on 22 August 1805 and was promoted to lieutenant on 6 March 1806. Promotion to captain followed on 4 April 1811, to major on 19 December 1811, to lieutenant-colonel on 30 December 1813, to colonel on 21 June 1827, and to major-general on 10 January 1837.

After arriving in Portugal he served throughout the Peninsular War as aide-de-camp to his elder brother Lord Hill and was slightly wounded during the campaign.

He was present at the Battle of Waterloo where he was wounded when a sword was thrust through his thigh, pinioning him to the ground.

In India, he commanded the Mysore Division of the Madras Army under the Marquess of Tweeddale from 24 November 1841.

== Death ==
Hill died at the falls of Guersoppa in the Indian state of Karnataka on 20 January 1845 aged 63 and was buried at Honavar on the 22 January.

There is a colossal monument erected in honour of Colonel Hill in Honavar. The monument is a 30-metre (98 ft) tall column popularly known as Colonel Hill Pillar. Locals are trying hard to preserve the column and grave.

A commemorative tablet dedicated to Hill was placed in St Chad's Church, Prees.

== Family ==
His brothers Rowland, Robert and Thomas all followed military careers and were present at the Battle of Waterloo.

He is not the same Clement Delves Hill who on 26 June 1841 Hill married Harriet Emma Charlotte, only daughter of sportsman and eccentric John Mytton (1796–1834). This man was actually his nephew, the youngest son of his eldest brother John Hill and Elizabeth Cornish Rhodes.
