= Rowland Hill, 1st Viscount Hill =

British Army officer and politician (1772–1842)

General The Right Honourable The Viscount Hill GCB GCH
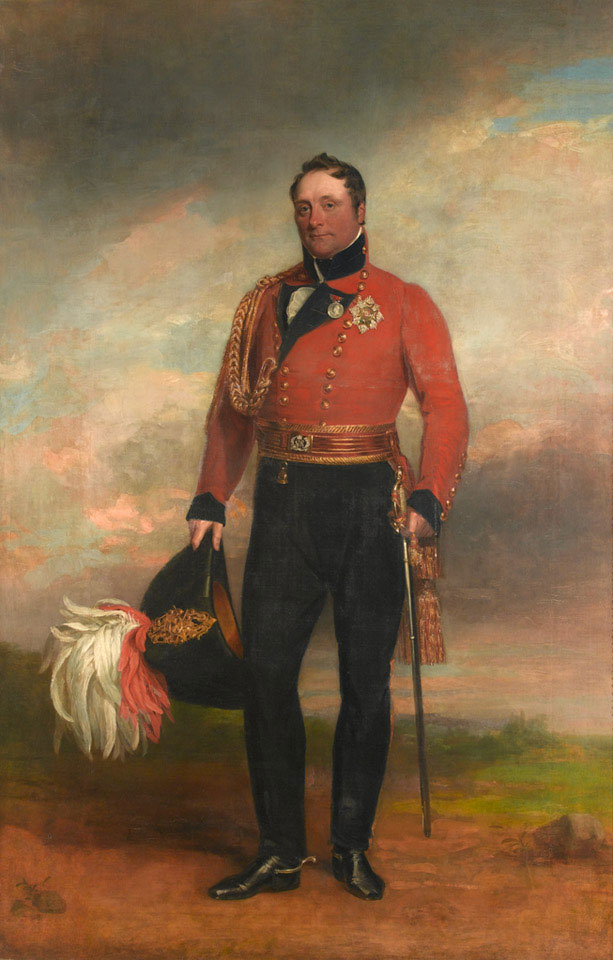
- Portrait by George Dawe, 1819

Commander-in-Chief of the Forces
- In office 22 January 1828 – 15 August 1842
- Monarchs: George IV; William IV; Victoria
- Preceded by: Duke of Wellington
- Succeeded by: Duke of Wellington

Personal details
- Born: 11 August 1772 Prees, Shropshire, England
- Died: 10 December 1842 (aged 70) Hadnall, Shropshire, England
- Party: Tory
- Relations: Sir Robert Hill (younger brother); Clement Hill (younger brother); Sir Thomas Hill (younger brother)
- Parents: Sir John Hill, 3rd Baronet; Mary Chambré
- Awards: Knight Grand Cross of the Order of the Bath; Knight Grand Cross of the Royal Guelphic Order; Grand Cross of the Order of the Tower and Sword (Portugal); Knight Commander of the Military William Order (Netherlands)
- Nickname: Daddy Hill

Military service
- Allegiance: Great Britain; United Kingdom
- Branch/service: British Army
- Years of service: 1790–1842
- Rank: General
- Unit: 38th Regiment of Foot; 53rd Regiment of Foot
- Commands: 90th Regiment of Foot; 2nd Division; II Corps
- Battles/wars: See battles: French Revolutionary Wars; Siege of Toulon (1793); French invasion of Egypt and Syria; Battle of Abukir (1801); Battle of Alexandria (1801) (WIA); Napoleonic Wars; Peninsular War; Battle of Roliça; Battle of Vimeiro; Battle of Corunna; Second Battle of Porto; Battle of Talavera; Battle of Bussaco; Battle of Arroyo dos Molinos; Combat of Navas de Membrillo; Battle of Almaraz; Battle of Vitoria; Battle of the Pyrenees; Battle of Nivelle; Battle of the Nive; Battle of Orthez; Battle of Toulouse (1814); Hundred Days; Battle of Waterloo

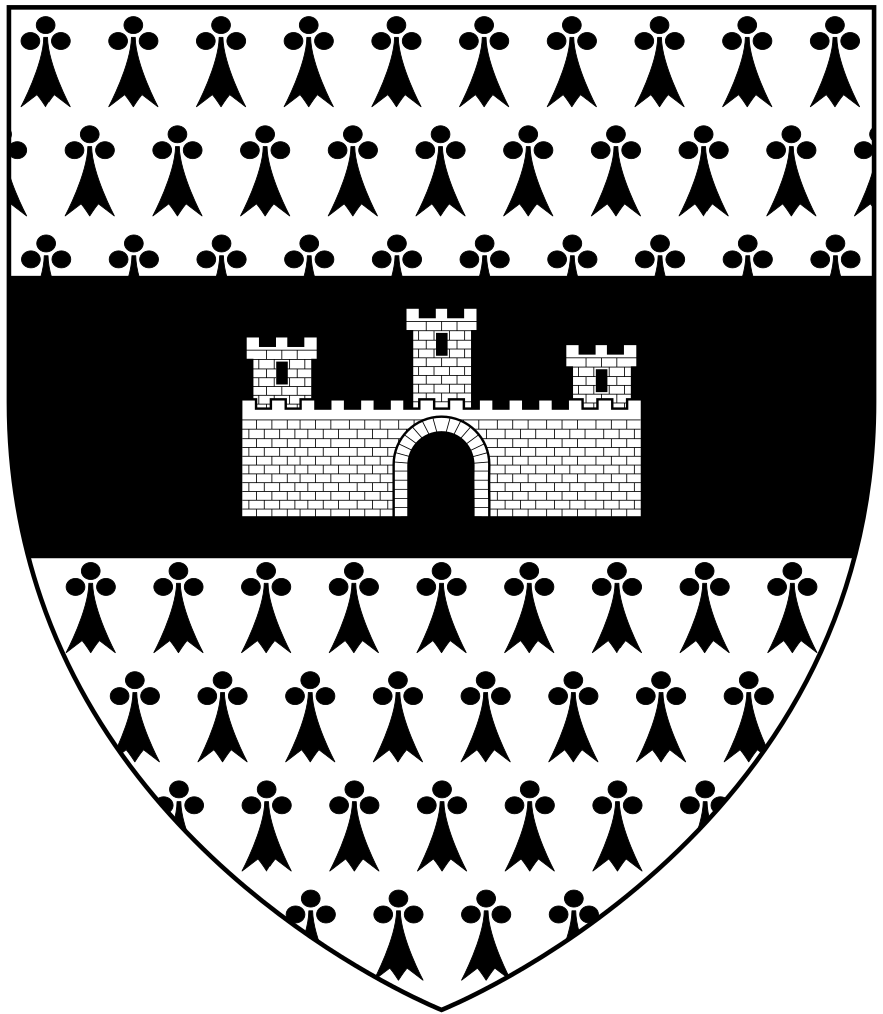
Hill's coat of arms: Ermine, on a fesse sable a castle triple towered argent

General Rowland Hill, 1st Viscount Hill, GCB, GCH (11 August 1772 – 10 December 1842) was a British Army officer and politician who served in the French Revolutionary and Napoleonic Wars. Hill became Commander-in-Chief of the Forces in 1828. Well-liked by the soldiers under his command, he was nicknamed "Daddy Hill".

== Background and early career ==
Hill was born on 11 August 1772 in Prees, Shropshire. He was the second son and fourth child of Sir John Hill, 3rd Baronet, a landowner, and Mary, co-heir and daughter of John Chambré of Petton, Shropshire.

Educated at The King's School in Chester, Hill was commissioned into the 38th Regiment of Foot in 1790. He was promoted to lieutenant on 27 January 1791. On 16 March 1791, after a period of leave, he was appointed to the 53rd Regiment of Foot. He was asked to raise an independent company and given the rank of captain on 30 March 1793.

He served at the siege of Toulon in Autumn 1793 as aide-de-camp to General Charles O'Hara from where he carried the dispatches to London. He then transferred to one of Major-General Cornelius Cuyler's independent companies on 16 November 1793. In 1794 he assisted Thomas Graham in raising the 90th Regiment of Foot, for which he was promoted to major on 27 May 1794, and to lieutenant-colonel on 26 July 1794. He was promoted to colonel on 1 January 1800.

In 1801 he commanded the 90th Regiment of Foot when they landed at Abu Qir Bay in Egypt as part of a force under Lieutenant-general Sir Ralph Abercromby; Hill was seriously wounded in the action when a musket ball hit his head. In the ensuing weeks Hill helped drive the French forces out of Egypt, and fought at the Battle of Alexandria in 1801. Hill was promoted to brigadier general in 1803 and again to major general on 2 November 1805.

== Peninsular War ==
During the Peninsular War, Hill commanded a brigade at the Battle of Roliça and also at the Battle of Vimeiro in 1808. He participated in Sir John Moore's 1808–1809 campaign in Spain, commanding a brigade at the Battle of Corunna. While serving under Wellington at the Second Battle of Porto, units of Hill's brigade launched an impromptu assault across the Douro River that ultimately routed Marshal Jean-de-Dieu Soult's French corps from Oporto.

Hill commanded the 2nd Division at the Battle of Talavera. The night before the battle, Marshal Claude-Victor Perrin mounted a surprise attack, swept aside two battalions of the King's German Legion and seized a key elevation. As Hill later recounted, "I was sure it was the old Buffs, as usual, making some blunder." Nevertheless, he led a reserve brigade forward in the dark. In the short clash that followed, Hill was briefly grabbed and nearly captured by a Frenchman, but his troops recovered the summit. This is the first occasion on which Hill supposedly swore.

Still leading the 2nd Division, during Marshal André Masséna's 1810 invasion of Portugal, Hill fought at the Battle of Bussaco. In autumn 1811, Wellington placed Hill in independent command of 16,000 men watching Badajoz. On 28 October he led a successful raid on the French at the Battle of Arroyo dos Molinos. On 21 January 1812 he was appointed to the honorary position of Governor of Blackness Castle and on 22 February 1812 he was appointed a Knight Companion of the Order of the Bath. He was made a Knight Grand Cross of the Portuguese Order of the Tower and Sword on 4 May 1812.

In May 1812, after the capture of Badajoz, Hill led a second raid that destroyed a key bridge in the Battle of Almaraz. While Wellington won the Battle of Salamanca, Hill protected Badajoz with an independent 18,000-man corps, including the British 2nd Division, John Hamilton's Portuguese division and William Erskine's 2nd Cavalry Division. He was promoted to lieutenant-general on 30 December 1811.

After the British capture of Madrid, Hill had responsibility for an army of 30,000 men. Hill commanded the right column during the campaign and decisive British victory at the Battle of Vitoria on 21 June 1813. Still in corps command, he fought in the Battle of the Pyrenees. At Vitoria and in Wellington's invasion of southern France, Hill's corps usually consisted of William Stewart's 2nd Division, the Portuguese Division (under John Hamilton, Francisco Silveira or Carlos Le Cor) and Pablo Morillo's Spanish Division. For his leadership in these battles, he was awarded a medal and two clasps on 7 October 1813. He led the Right Corps at the Battle of Nivelle on 10 November 1813.

On 13 December 1813, during the Battle of the Nive, Hill performed what may have been his finest work in his defence of St-Pierre d'Irube. With his 14,000 men and 10 guns isolated on the east bank of the Nive by a broken bridge, Hill held off the attacks of Marshal Jean-de-Dieu Soult's 30,000 soldiers and 22 guns. He fought with great skill and "was seen at every point of danger, and repeatedly led up rallied regiments in person to save what seemed like a lost battle ... He was even heard to swear." Later, he fought at the Orthez and Toulouse. Wellington said, "The best of Hill is that I always know where to find him." He was appointed Governor of Hull on 13 July 1814.

Nicknamed "Daddy Hill", he looked after his troops and was adored by his men. On one occasion, he provided a wounded officer who arrived at his headquarters with a lunch basket. Another time, a sergeant delivered a letter to Hill. Expecting nothing but a nod of thanks, the man was astonished when the general arranged for his supper and a place for him to stay for the night. The next day, Hill gave him food and a pound for the rest of his journey.

He was also Tory Member of Parliament (MP) for Shrewsbury from 1812 to 1814, when he was raised to his peerage as Baron Hill of Almaraz and of Hawkestone in the county of Salop, although military duties made him unable to attend the House of Commons prior to his elevation to the Lords. The peerage brought with it a £2,000 pension.

Hill was also colonel of the 3rd Garrison Battalion from 14 January 1809, colonel of the 94th Regiment of Foot from 23 September 1809, colonel of the 72nd Regiment of Foot from 29 April 1815 and colonel of the Royal Regiment of Horse Guards from 19 November 1830.

== Waterloo and later career ==
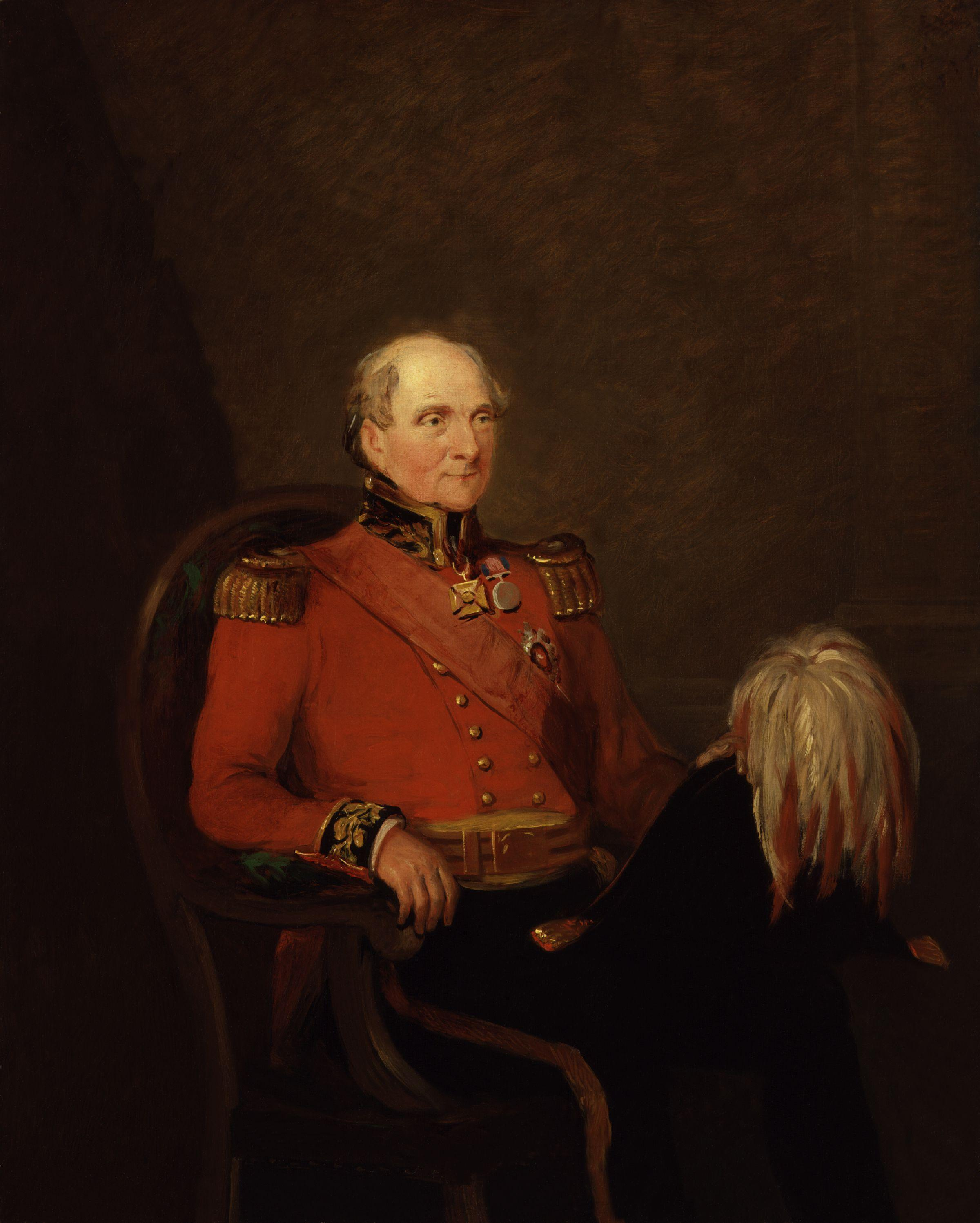
1836 portrait of Hill by William Salter

At the Battle of Waterloo Hill commanded the II Corps. He led the charge of Sir Frederick Adam's brigade against the Imperial Guard towards the end of the battle. For some time it was thought that he had fallen in the melee. He escaped unwounded, and after the battle wrote to his sister, "I verily believe there never was so tremendous a battle fought as that at Waterloo." Thereafter he continued with the army in France until its withdrawal in 1818.

He received several awards from allied nations after the battle. He was appointed a Knight Grand Cross of the Order of the Bath on 4 January 1815 and on 21 August 1815 he was made Knight Commander of the Order of Maria Theresa of Austria and Knight of the Order of St. George of Russia. On 27 August 1815 the Dutch King William I made him a Commander of the exclusive Military Order of William. At the coronation of George IV in 1821, Lord Hill bore the Standard of England in the procession from Westminster Hall to Westminster Abbey. From 1828 to 1842, he succeeded the Duke of Wellington as Commander-in-Chief of the Forces. He was also appointed Governor of Plymouth on 18 June 1830 and became Viscount Hill of Almaraz on 22 September 1842.

A keen foxhunter, Hill was master of the North Shropshire Foxhounds until 1823. The pack exists to this day and hunts the north of the county, including the grounds of his childhood home, Hawkstone Hall. He later shared the Mastership with Sir Bellingham Graham and Sir Edward Smythe, the hounds at this time being kennelled two miles south-east of Hawkstone Hall. Hill also formed the Hawkstone Otter Hunt around 1800, which was maintained and hunted by successive viscounts. He served as treasurer of the Salop Infirmary at Shrewsbury in 1825, laying the foundation stone of a major rebuild of the hospital in 1827.

He died at Hardwicke Grange, Hadnall, Shropshire on 10 December 1842. He is buried in the churchyard at Hadnall.

== Family ==
Hill never married and on his death the baronetcy passed in remainder to Rowland Hill, 2nd Viscount Hill, the son of his deceased brother, John. His brothers Robert, Clement and Thomas, also followed military careers and were present at the Battle of Waterloo.

== See also ==
- Viscount Hill
- Hawkstone Park
- Lord Hill's Column

== Footnotes ==
Military offices
Preceded by The Lord Forbes	Colonel of the 3rd Garrison Battalion; 1809	Succeeded by Baldwin Leighton
Preceded by Francis Dundas	Colonel of the 94th Regiment of Foot; 1809–1815	Unknown
Preceded by Sir James Henry Craig	Governor of Blackness Castle; 1812–1814	Succeeded by The Earl of Lindsey
Preceded by The Duke of Richmond	Governor of Kingston-upon-Hull; 1814–1830	Succeeded by The Earl Cathcart
Preceded by James Stuart	Colonel of the 72nd Regiment of Foot; 1815–1817	Succeeded by Sir George Murray
Preceded by Sir John Abercromby	Colonel of the 53rd (Shropshire) Regiment of Foot; 1817–1830	Succeeded by Lord FitzRoy Somerset
Preceded by The Duke of Wellington	Commander-in-Chief of the Forces; 1828–1842	Succeeded by The Duke of Wellington
Preceded by The Duke of Cumberland	Colonel of the Royal Regiment of Horse Guards (The Blues); 1830–1842	Succeeded by The Marquess of Anglesey
Preceded by The Earl Harcourt	Governor of Plymouth; 1830–1842	Office abolished
Parliament of the United Kingdom
Preceded by William Hill; Henry Grey Bennet	Member of Parliament for Shrewsbury; 1812–1814; With: Henry Grey Bennet	Succeeded by Richard Lyster; Henry Grey Bennet
Peerage of the United Kingdom
New creation	Viscount Hill; 1842	Succeeded by Rowland Hill
New creation	Baron Hill; 1814–1842	Extinct
New creation	Baron Hill; 1816–1842	Succeeded by Rowland Hill
