= James Hay, Lord Hay =

British army officer

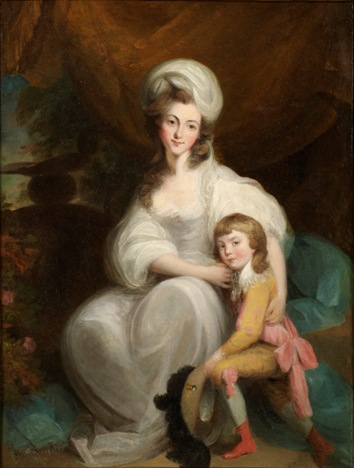
Alicia Eliot with her son James Hay, Lord Hay (1 January 1800)

James Hay, Lord Hay and Lord Slains (7 July 1797 – 16 June 1815) was a British Army officer and Scottish aristocrat killed during the Waterloo Campaign.

== Biography ==
Lord Hay was the eldest son and heir of William Hay, 17th Earl of Erroll and his second wife, Alicia Eliot (d. 1812).

Hay, an ensign in the 1st Foot Guards, was killed at the Battle of Quatre Bras while serving as aide-de-camp to General Maitland. Had he lived, he would have succeeded his father as Earl of Erroll upon his death in 1819; as it was, his brother William succeeded to the title.

In 1899, Murray's Magazine published some recollections by Georgiana, Dowager Lady De Ros (a daughter of the Duchess of Richmond) about the Duchess of Richmond's ball that took place on 15 June 1815, the night before the Battle of Quatre Bras. She recalled "I remember being quite provoked with poor Lord Hay, a dashing merry youth, full of military ardour, whom I knew very well for his delight at the idea of going into action, and of all the honours he was to gain; and the first news we had on the 16th was that he and the Duke of Brunswick were killed".

Circa 1890, Hay's remains were moved to the crypt under The British Waterloo Campaign Monument in The Brussels Cemetery at Evere.

== Fictional portrayals ==
- In the 1970 film Waterloo, Hay is portrayed by British actor Peter Davies; in contrast with historical events, he is a main character, constantly at Wellington's side on the day of Waterloo. At the Duchess of Richmond's ball, he dances with her daughter Sarah and the two are obviously in love. The Duchess says to Wellington, "Don't let young Hay get killed", and he is surprised to hear that they have been formally engaged. Later in the film, Hay serves alongside the Duchess' brother, the Duke of Gordon, chieftain of Clan Gordon. Wellington remarks to Hay that he is "a lucky fellow, to see such a sight (the French Army) in your first battle". The fictional Hay's last words are "Think of England, men, think of England!" but these are likely to have been fabricated by the scriptwriters. He is struck in the head by a bullet and dies instantly.
- He is also portrayed in Georgette Heyer's 1937 novel An Infamous Army, which deals with events of Waterloo through the eyes of fictional characters but describing real people and events.
