= Thomas Noel Hill =

British Army officer (1784–1832)

Colonel Sir Thomas Noel Hill KCB, KTS (24 February 1784 – 8 January 1832) was a British Army officer of the Napoleonic Wars who fought at the Battle of Waterloo on 18 June 1815.

== Life and career ==
Born at Hawkstone Hall, near Prees, Shropshire, Hill was the seventh son of Sir John Hill, 3rd Baronet. He was younger brother to Rowland Hill, 1st Viscount Hill, Sir Robert Hill, and Major-General Clement Hill.

Educated at Shrewsbury School, he then entered the army on 25 September 1801, at the age of seventeen, as a cornet in the 10th Royal Hussars (Prince of Wales's Own) and purchased a lieutenancy the following year. In 1806, by now a captain, he exchanged to the 53rd Regiment of Foot and served as aide-de-camp to his brother Rowland in England and Ireland before accompanying him to Portugal in 1808.

Hill was present at the subsequent battles of Roliça and Vimeiro, as well as during the retreat of Sir John Moore's army following the Battle of Corunna.

When the Portuguese Army was created in 1809 under Lieutenant-General William Beresford, Hill was appointed to the command of the 1st Portuguese Regiment, with the rank of lieutenant-colonel, and made brevet major in the British Army at the same time. Together with the Portuguese 16th (Vieira Telles) Regiment and the 4th Regiment of Caçadores, Hill's unit completed the 1st Independent Brigade under the command of Sir Denis Pack, which subsequently took part in the Battle of Bussaco on 27 September 1810. In 1811, Hill was promoted to the rank of lieutenant-colonel by brevet in the British army.

For his role in the Siege of Ciudad Rodrigo, Hill received an honorary distinction and he went on to fight in the battles of Salamanca (1812), Vitoria (1813) and the Siege of San Sebastián (1813). Hill received a medal on each of those occasions. Having attained the rank of colonel in the Portuguese Army, he returned to England in 1814 having with permission received the Portuguese Order of the Tower and Sword on 11 March 1813. In July that year he was promoted to a company in the 1st Foot Guards then in January 1815 he was created a Knight Commander of the Order of the Bath.

Hill was subsequently employed as an assistant in the Adjutant-General's department, and for his services at the Battle of Waterloo received the Waterloo Medal and was nominated for a Knight Cross of the Bavarian Military Order of Max Joseph. He was promoted to lieutenant-colonel on the 25 July 1814 and knighted on the 28th of the same month.

Back in England, he retired for a time on half-pay. In 1825, he was promoted to colonel and in 1827, after applying to the then-Commander-in-chief, the Duke of Wellington, he was appointed Deputy Adjutant-General in Canada.

== Death ==
Having succeeded Sir John Brown as commander of the cavalry depot at Maidstone in Kent, he died in office on 8 January 1832 aged 47 after a short illness. His body lay in state in the local barracks for a day before the funeral, the procession of which included lancers, dragoons of his old regiment, the 13th, a band playing the Dead March in Saul and a firing party numbering 150 men with rifles reversed. His brother Rowland acted as chief mourner while others in attendance included Lieutenant-General James Kempt, the Master-General of the Ordnance and Sir John Beresford, the Commander-in-Chief, The Nore.

His widow, Anna Maria, Lady Hill (née Hon. Anna Maria Shore), the second daughter of John Shore, 1st Baron Teignmouth, died at her residence in Hampton Court Palace on 25 February 1886.
