= Petton, Shropshire =

Coordinates: 52.835°N 2.834°W

Petton
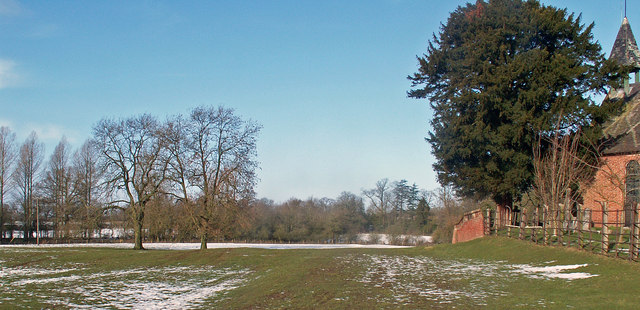
- Petton. Its church is on the right.

- Location within Shropshire
- OS grid reference: SJ438267
- Civil parish: Petton
- Unitary authority: Shropshire
- Ceremonial county: Shropshire
- Region: West Midlands
- Country: England
- Sovereign state: United Kingdom
- Post town: SHREWSBURY
- Postcode district: SY4
- Dialling code: 01939
- Police: West Mercia
- Fire: Shropshire
- Ambulance: West Midlands
- UK Parliament: North Shropshire

Petton is a small village and civil parish in Shropshire, England. It was mentioned in Domesday as "Peetone", a name probably derived from Old English paec-tun, "settlement by the hill".

Petton is near to the village and parish of Cockshutt, south-east of the town Ellesmere. The two parishes have in recent years combined their parish councils under the name Cockshutt-cum-Petton.

== See also ==
- Listed buildings in Petton
