= North Shropshire by-election =

North Shropshire by-election may refer to various parliamentary by-elections in the north of Shropshire, England:

- 1843 North Shropshire by-election, following Rowland Hill's elevation to the Lords
- 1848 North Shropshire by-election, following Edward Herbert's elevation to the Lords
- 1866 North Shropshire by-election, following Charles Cust's resignation
- 1867 North Shropshire by-election, following Adelbert Brownlow-Cust's elevation to the Lords
- 1876 North Shropshire by-election, following John Ormsby-Gore's elevation to the Lords
- 2021 North Shropshire by-election, following Owen Paterson's resignation
