= Geoffrey Hill (cricketer, born 1837) =

English cricketer, cricket administrator and soldier (1837-1891)

- Born: Geoffrey Richard Clegg Hill; 17 April 1837; Weston-under-Redcastle, Shropshire, England
- Died: 4 May 1891 (aged 54); Llandeilo, Carmarthenshire, Wales
- Parents: Rowland Hill, 2nd Viscount Hill (father); Anne Clegg (mother)
- Relatives: Rowland Clegg-Hill (brother)
- Cricket career

Cricket information

Domestic team information
- Years: Team
- 1861: Marylebone Cricket Club

Geoffrey Richard Clegg Hill DL JP (17 April 1837 – 4 May 1891) was an English cricketer and British Army officer.

The son of Rowland Hill, 2nd Viscount Hill, he was born in April 1837 at Hawkstone Hall in Weston-under-Redcastle, Shropshire. He was educated at Harrow School. After completing his education, Hill purchased the rank of cornet in the Royal Horse Guards in December 1854, later purchasing the rank of lieutenant in March 1857.

A keen cricketer, Hill made a single appearance for the Marylebone Cricket Club (MCC) against Hampshire at Lord's in 1861. He batted once in the match, making three runs in the MCC first innings before being dismissed caught and bowled by Henry Holmes. He played below at county level for Shropshire between 1867–73 and club level for Wem and Hawkstone.

Having retired from the Royal Horse Guards in April 1864, Hill was appointed a deputy lieutenant of Shropshire in 1865. He was appointed captain in July 1867, at which point he was serving with the 1st Shropshire Artillery Volunteer Corps, with promotion to major following in May 1869. Hill resigned his commission in December 1875. He was also a justice of the peace for Shropshire.

His elder brother was the politician Rowland Clegg-Hill, 3rd Viscount Hill.

Hill died following a short illness in May 1891 at his residence near Llandeilo in Wales.
