= Shrewsbury Museum and Art Gallery =

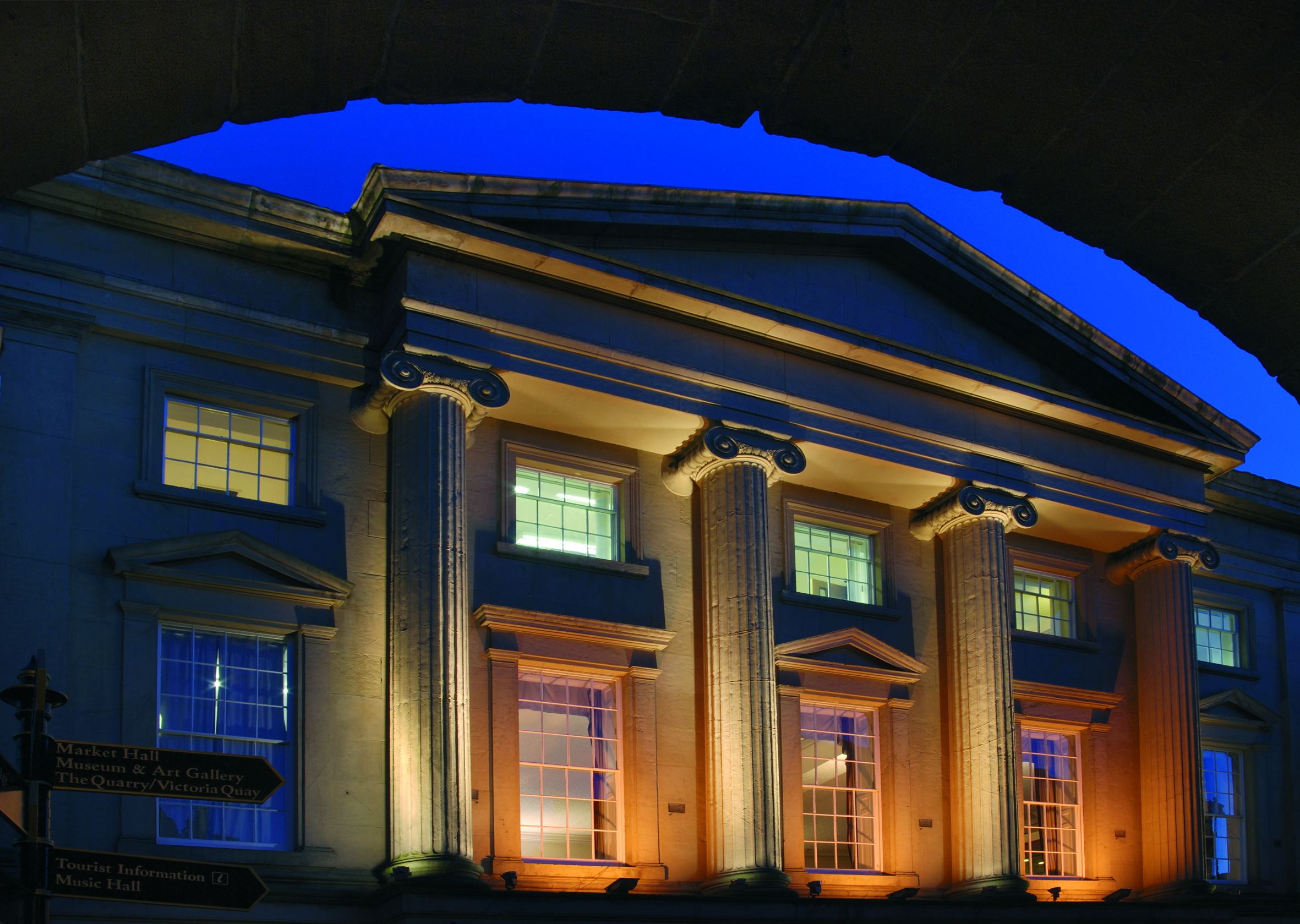
- Shrewsbury Museum & Art Gallery at night
- Established: 1835
- Location: The Square, Shrewsbury, England
- Coordinates: 52.707150°N 2.7548110°W
- Type: Local Authority museum
- Collection size: approx. 300,000 objects
- Visitors: 300,000-350,000 expected per annum
- Website: www.shrewsburymuseum.org.uk

Shrewsbury Museum and Art Gallery was founded in 1835 as the Museum of the Shropshire and North Wales Natural History and Antiquarian Society Society in Dogpole, Shrewsbury, England. In 1853 the collections were moved to Vaughan's Mansion on College Hill, which became known as the Shropshire and North Wales Museum. After 160 years and two subsequent homes the museum returned to Vaughan's Mansion and the Music Hall Complex after a major redevelopment of the site.

== History ==
The Shrewsbury Museum and Art Gallery was founded in 1835 as the Museum of the Shropshire and North Wales Natural History and Antiquarian Society Society in Dogpole, Shrewsbury. In 1853 the collections were moved to Vaughan's Mansion on College Hill, which became known as the Shropshire and North Wales Museum.

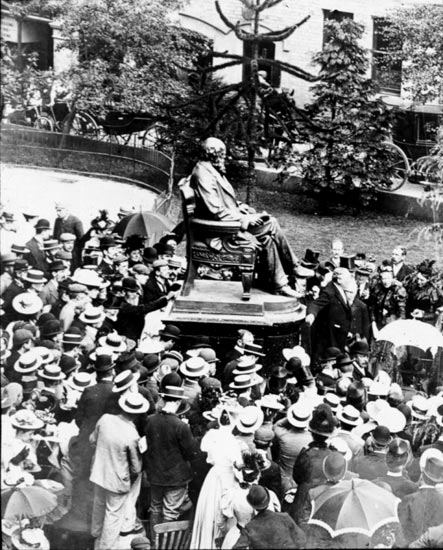
Unveiling of the Darwin Statue outside the Shrewsbury Museum in 1897

In 1877 the Society merged with newly formed Shropshire Archaeological Society to become Shropshire Archaeological and Natural History Society. That year the museum accepted a major collection of finds recently excavated at Wroxeter.

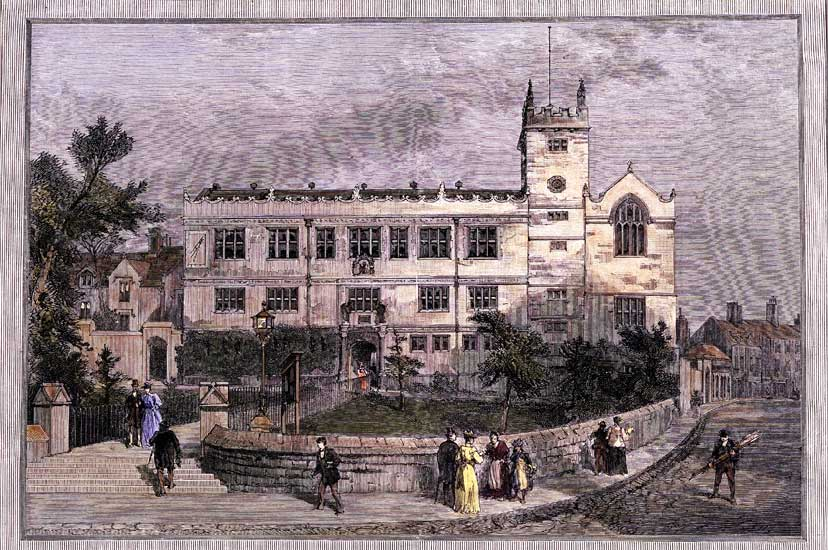
Shrewsbury Museum and Free Library in the former Shrewsbury School building

The museum celebrated its 50th anniversary in 1885 with the transfer of the museum and library to the recently vacated old Shrewsbury School building. At this time the museum was placed under public ownership (Corporation of Shrewsbury) - becoming Shrewsbury Museum and Free Library.

In 1894 the Curator, George Holt, published the Rules of the Shrewsbury Free Museum. These state that:

- No children under 14 years of age shall be admitted, unless in charge of some responsible person.
- Persons are not allowed to lean upon the cases, or to touch any of the objects exhibited, and if found so doing, they shall be liable to immediate expulsion.
- No person shall be admitted who is intoxicated or is in an uncleanly condition, nor shall any smoking be permitted, nor shall any person be allowed to partake of refreshments therein. Playing, gaming, betting, swearing, and spitting, are strictly prohibited, nor shall any dog be admitted.
- Any person who shall offend against these regulations, or shall be guilty of any misconduct, shall not be allowed to remain within the building.

In 1931 'Rowley's House' was acquired by the Corporation of Shrewsbury through the generosity of Morris and Co. for the particular purpose of housing archaeological material from the site of Viroconium Cornoviorum near Wroxeter. The building opened to the public seven years later and became known as the Uriconium or Roman Museum.

Local Government re-organisation in 1974 resulted in Shrewsbury Library and the old Shrewsbury School building being transferred to ownership of Shropshire County Council. However, the Museum Collections were retained by the new Shrewsbury and Atcham Borough Council and transferred to Rowley's House and other Borough Council buildings. In 1981 Rowley’s Mansion opened after its purchase and refurbishment to extend the Roman Museum, allowing it to house additional collections.

In 2009, with the creation of a unitary authority for Shropshire, Shrewsbury Museum Service merged with Shropshire County Museum Service. Shropshire Council's Shropshire Museums continues to manage the museum as part of a portfolio of seven sites across the county.

== Relocation to the Music Hall ==
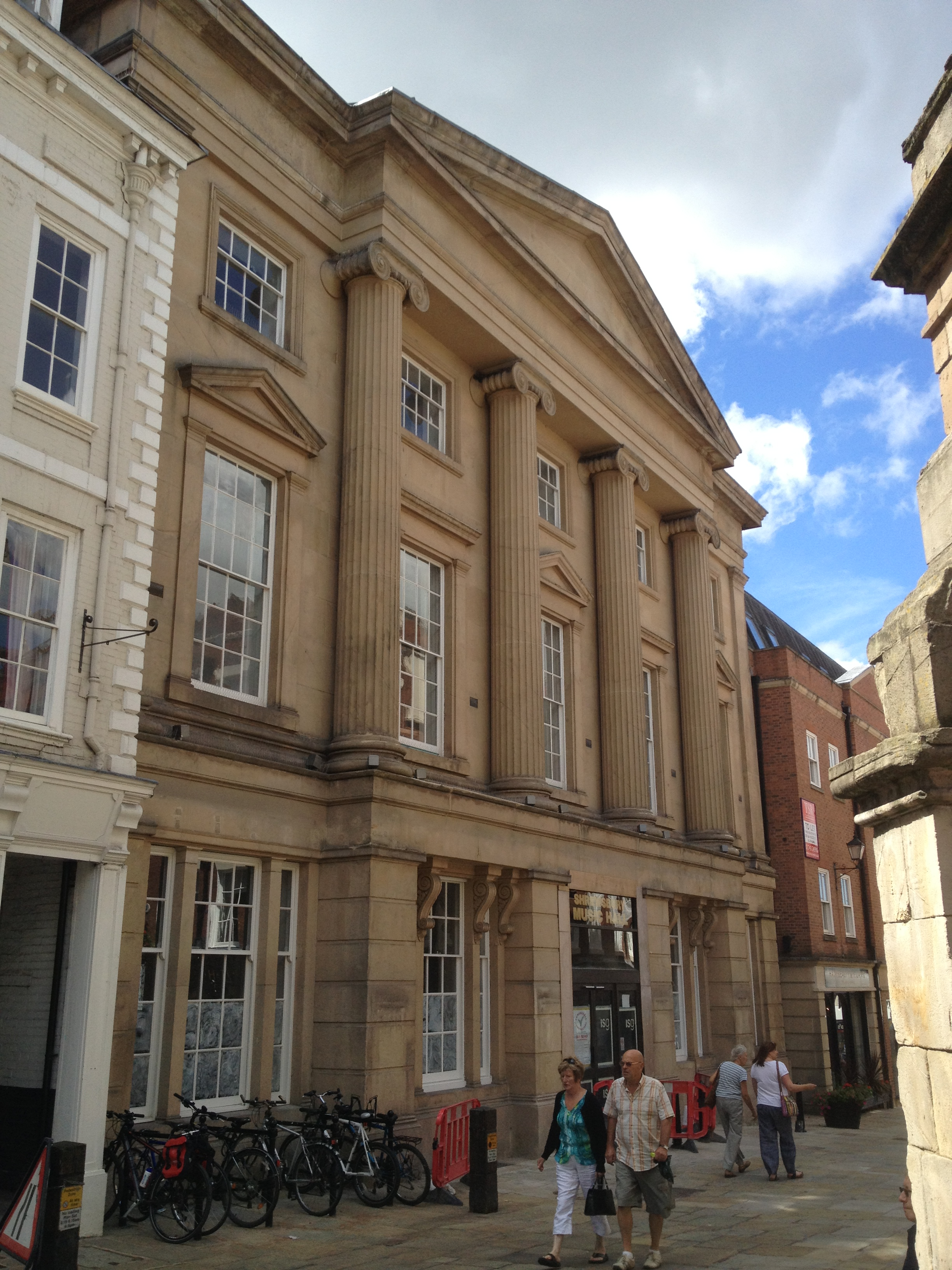
The former Music Hall is the museum's present home.

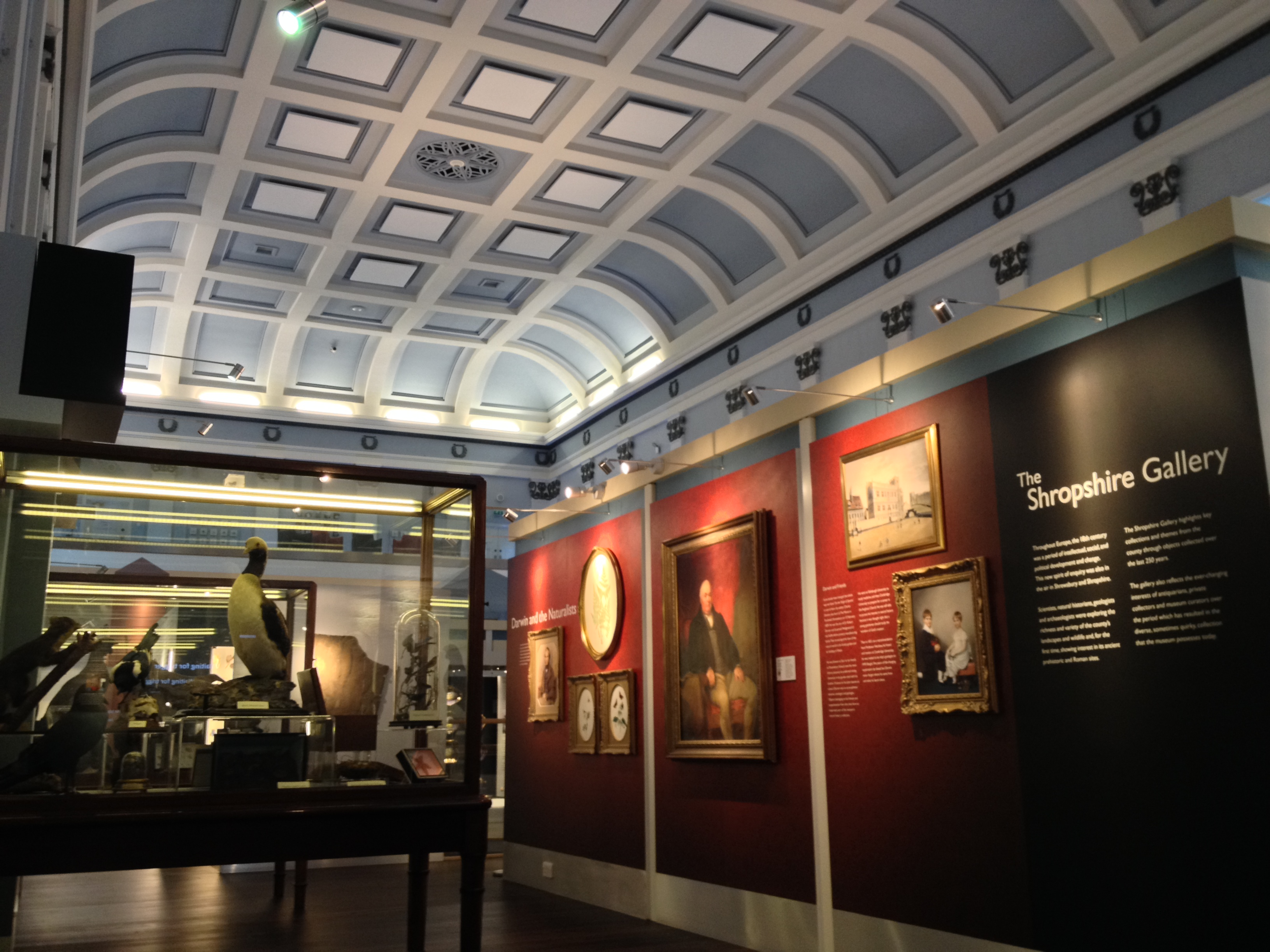
The Shropshire Gallery is home to a large part of the museum's collection.

The Music Hall is a large Victorian building located on The Square in Shrewsbury town centre. Owned by Shropshire Council, the building was converted from its previous use as a theatre to house the new Shrewsbury Museum and Art Gallery. The redevelopment began in 2009, following relocation of the town's theatre to a new purpose-built entertainment venue in Frankwell, Theatre Severn, in January of that year. The former Music Hall, however, remains one of the most important sites in Shrewsbury, at the heart of the earliest part of the town.

It is a unique collection of buildings, including the Grade II* listed 13th-century Vaughan's Mansion, one of only a handful of early medieval defensive hall houses remaining in the UK. Occupying the main part of the site is the 19th-century Music Hall and Assembly Rooms, designed by Edward Haycock Snr in 1835 and listed as Grade II. The complex also includes a medieval shut (a passageway between buildings typical of Shrewsbury), 19th-century police holding cells (which were used to house defendants due to appear at trial in the Old Market Hall opposite) and a 20th-century civil defence bunker. In essence the Music Hall site is a microcosm of the town as a whole that reflects a broad range of local traditions. Furthermore, the site was once the location of the town's fire service and, as such, the passage which runs through the Music Hall and out onto Swan Hill is called Fire Office Passage.

By sensitive restoration the history of the buildings was revealed, reflecting the social, cultural and economic development of Shrewsbury over some seven centuries, alongside the re-evaluated and re-interpreted museum collections, many of which were moved from the museum's then location, at Rowley's House on Barker Street. The new museum development made use of many of the old theatre's performance and dressing spaces whilst retaining the cafe and town's visitor information centre. In its new role the Museum and Art Gallery opened to visitors in 2014 but it was not officially opened until 17 September 2015, by the Duke of Gloucester.

In August 2019 the museum unveiled a new stained glass window created by local artist Nathalie Hildegarde Liege for permanent display. The window was inspired by the museum’s Hall of Rocks and Minerals collection and the Margaret Agnes Rope exhibition, which took place in 2016.

== Collections ==
At a meeting held by the Shropshire and North Wales Natural History Society at Shrewsbury on 26 June 1835, it was resolved to establish a museum and scientific library:

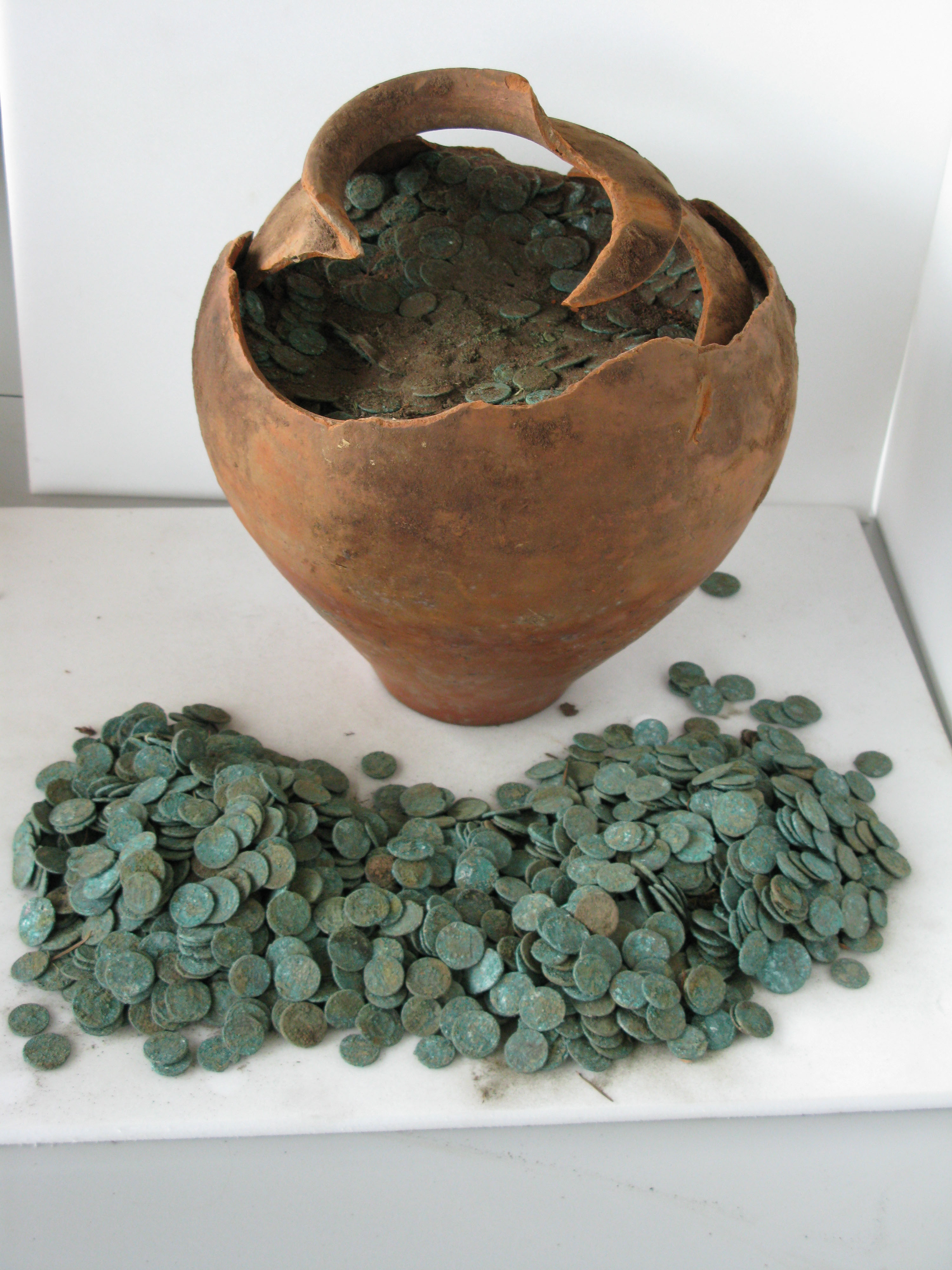
The Shrewsbury Hoard is on permanent display in the museum.

...principally designed to illustrate the natural history of the district, in its various branches of Geology, Mineralogy, Zoology, and Botany, by the gradual formation of complete and systematic arrangements of its productions, in each of these departments. It will also be open to other objects of Scientific interest, and in particular, it will be a suitable Repository for such remains of antiquity as are found within the District, or illustrate its General History.

The museum was quick to encourage local inhabitants "...to raise the character and increase the intellectual resources of a District". Significant local figures including nobility, gentry and clergy were invited to donate items. Items were given by many including Sir Baldwin Leighton (Bart), Right Hon Lord Berwick, His Excellency Sir Henry Huntley, Sir J. R. Kynaston (Bart) and Sir Rowland Hill MP (Bart). The museum also had close links to, and received donations from, eminent scientists of the time including Charles Darwin, Henry Blunt and Sir Roderick Impey Murchison.

The collections today form part of Shropshire Council's Shropshire Museums. Particular strengths remain Late Prehistoric and Roman archaeology and geology where collections include nationally significant items:

- The Hadrianic Forum Inscription from Wroxeter
- The Wroxeter Roman Mirror
- The Guilsfield Bronze Age Hoard
- The Condover Mammoths
- The Grinshill Rhynchosaur
- Two mid-18th-century views of Coalbrookdale by William Williams
- A great auk specimen prepared by Henry Shaw

The collection of Caughley porcelain is also of note being one of the finest in the UK. Acquisitions made in 2012/13 with support from the Friends of Shrewsbury Museums include the Shrewsbury Hoard and a watercolour of the town by Michael Angelo Rooker.

== See also ==
- Listed buildings in Shrewsbury (southeast central area)
