= Henry Shaw (taxidermist) =

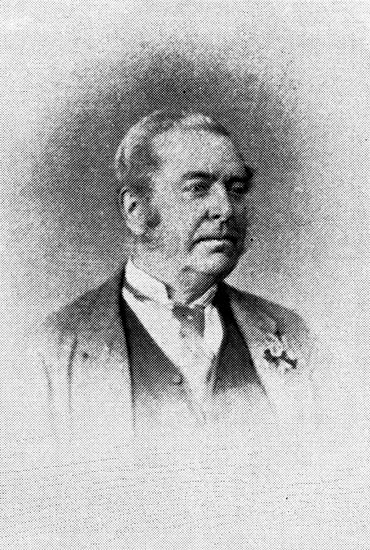
- Born: 3 October 1812; Tarporley, Cheshire
- Died: 7 October 1887 (aged 75); Shrewsbury, Shropshire
- Occupation: Taxidermist

Henry Shaw (3 October 1812 – 7 October 1887) was a notable nineteenth century English taxidermist working in Shropshire, England during the golden age of taxidermy when mounted animals became a popular part of Victorian era interior design.

Shaw was born in Tarporley, Cheshire. His family moved to Shrewsbury, Shropshire when he was a young boy, where his father ran a small taxidermy shop in Shoplatch. Henry and his brother, John, trained under their father and continued to run the business as partners after their father's death in 1832.

The brothers later separated and established respective taxidermy businesses in the town. Henry, who set up shop and made his home in High Street, became the more successful, securing orders to mount and arrange collections at Hawkstone Park and Ludlow Museum. Lord Hill appointed him curator of his collection at Hawkstone with an annual salary and a reputation that led to orders from across the country that included commissions from the Duke of Westminster for Eaton Hall, the Earl of Powis at Powis Castle, and the Duke of Portland at Welbeck Abbey, his last great commission, in 1886.

Shaw was strong well-built character with a love of fighting and country sports. He was an accomplished salmon fisherman, and was quite active on the River Wye where he had a fishing lease. Shaw died of pleurisy at his home in Shrewsbury High Street, aged 75, on 7 October 1887 after a short illness, having caught a cold a few days before when fishing at Builth Wells. He was buried on 10 October at Shrewsbury General Cemetery.

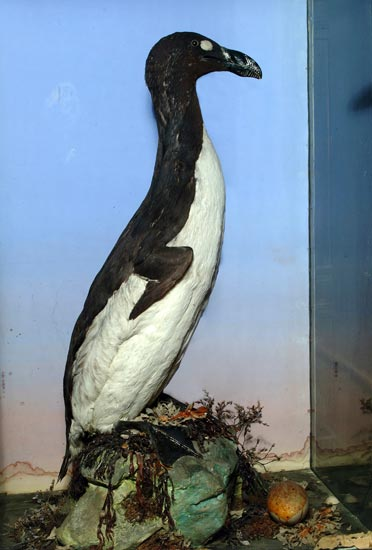
Great auk taxidermy specimen prepared by Henry Shaw

Henry Shaw's specimens can be distinguished by his preference for all-wood cases with a glass front. The specimens are usually mounted on an artificial blue-grey rock with surrounding foliage. Examples of his mounted specimens remain in the collections of Shropshire Museums and are displayed at Shrewsbury Museum and Art Gallery. These include one of three great auk specimens prepared by him.
