= 1876 North Shropshire by-election =

UK Parliamentary by-election

The 1876 North Shropshire by-election was fought on 3 February 1876. The by-election was fought due to the elevation to the peerage of the incumbent Conservative MP, John Ormsby-Gore. It was won by the Conservative candidate Stanley Leighton.

1876 North Shropshire by-election (1 seat)
Party	Candidate	Votes	%	±%
Conservative	Stanley Leighton	2,737	50.3	N/A
Conservative	Salusbury Kynaston Mainwaring	2,700	49.7	N/A
Majority		37	0.6	N/A
Turnout		5,437	74.1	N/A
Registered electors		7,342		
Conservative hold				
