= Shrewsbury Hoard =

Hoard of Roman coins found in England

Coordinates: 52.71°N 2.75°W

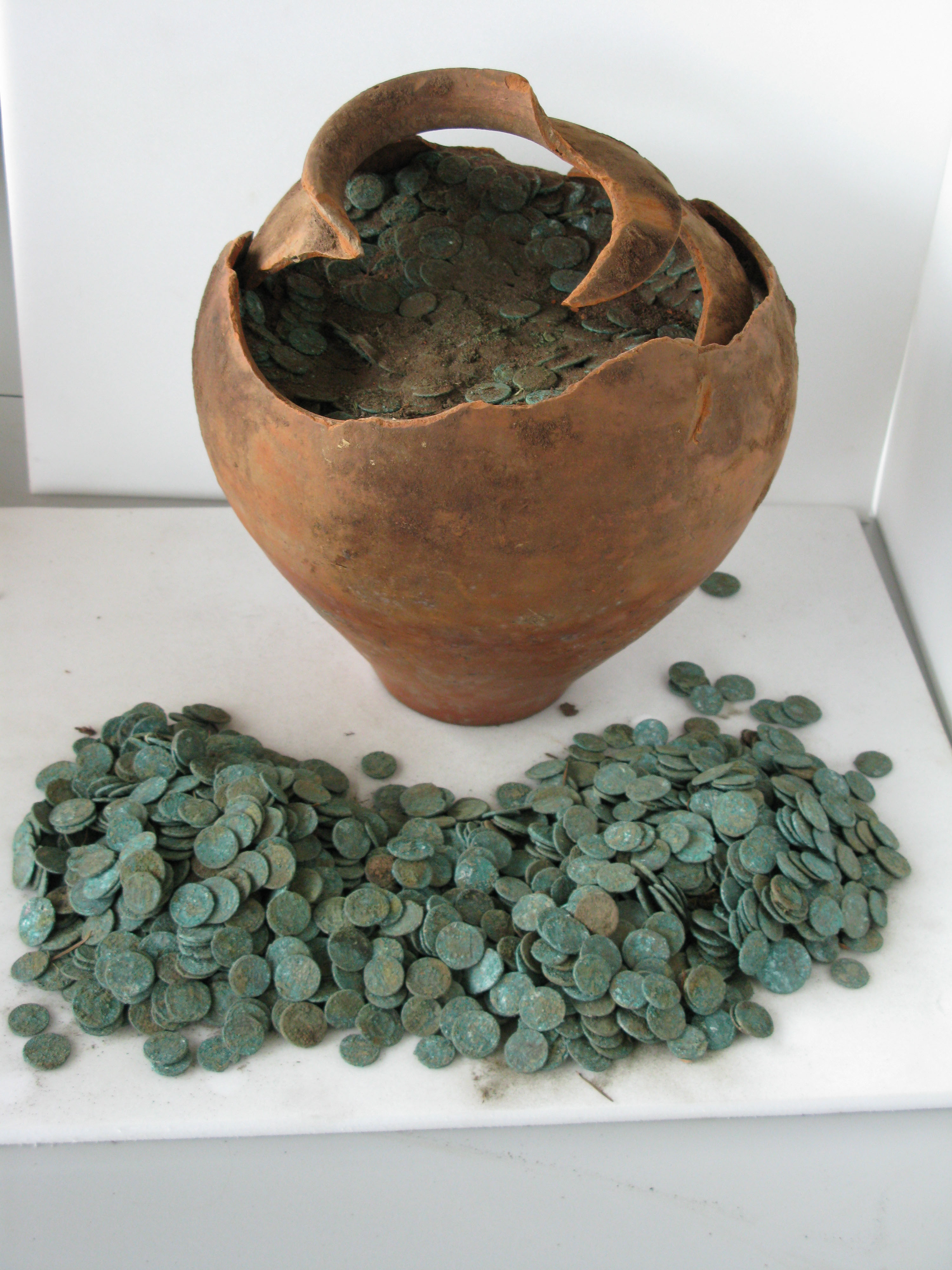
- Pot and coins from the hoard
- Material: Bronze
- Size: 9,315 coins
- Created: Mid-4th century
- Period/culture: Romano-British
- Discovered: Near Shrewsbury, Shropshire, by Nic Davies in August 2009
- Present location: Shrewsbury Museum and Art Gallery, Shrewsbury

The Shrewsbury Hoard (also known as the Shropshire Hoard) is a hoard of 9,315 bronze Roman coins discovered by a metal detectorist in a field near Shrewsbury, Shropshire in August 2009. The coins were found in a large pottery storage jar that was buried in about AD 335.

== Discovery and excavation ==
The coins were found buried in a brown pot in a plantation next to a public bridleway by Nic Davies only a month after he had started metal detecting as a hobby, and were his first find. Davies did not have permission from the landowner to metal detect on his land, not realising that it was a requirement, and when he located the hoard he dug up the pot himself, although he subsequently took it to show Peter Reavill, the Portable Antiquities Scheme Finds Liaison Officer for Herefordshire and Shropshire. Davies later led Reavill and Shropshire County Council archaeologists to the find site, and a small excavation was carried out. The excavation revealed that the pot had probably been placed in the ground partially full (with coins dating to about AD 320), and that the pot had subsequently been filled up with coins dating to AD 333–335 before being covered with a large marker stone. The top of the pot had broken off, and about 300 scattered coins were recovered from the area around the find spot. The total weight of the pot and the coins was approximately 32 kg (71 lb).

After the excavation was completed, the hoard was sent to the British Museum in London for cleaning and conservation.

== Items discovered ==
The coins are all bronze and silver-washed bronze nummi, and date to the period between AD 313 and 335, corresponding to the latter part of the reign of Constantine I and the period of joint reign of his three sons, Constantine II, Constantius II and Constans. There were also a very few radiates dating to AD 260–293.

In addition to the coins, an iron nail and a piece of cloth were found towards the bottom of the pot. It is very unusual for organic material such as cloth to survive, but the copper from coins prevented the decay of the cloth in this case. It is thought that it may be the remains of a cloth bag that closed with a nail, and put in with the coins as a votive offering.

== Significance ==
Although the coins are not individually valuable, the large number of coins in the hoard makes it important. Reavill has speculated that as Britain produced food for export to other parts of the Roman Empire during the reign of Constantine I, the coins may represent payment to a farmer or farming community for a harvest, and that the money may have been buried for safe-keeping, with money being withdrawn when needed.

== Display ==
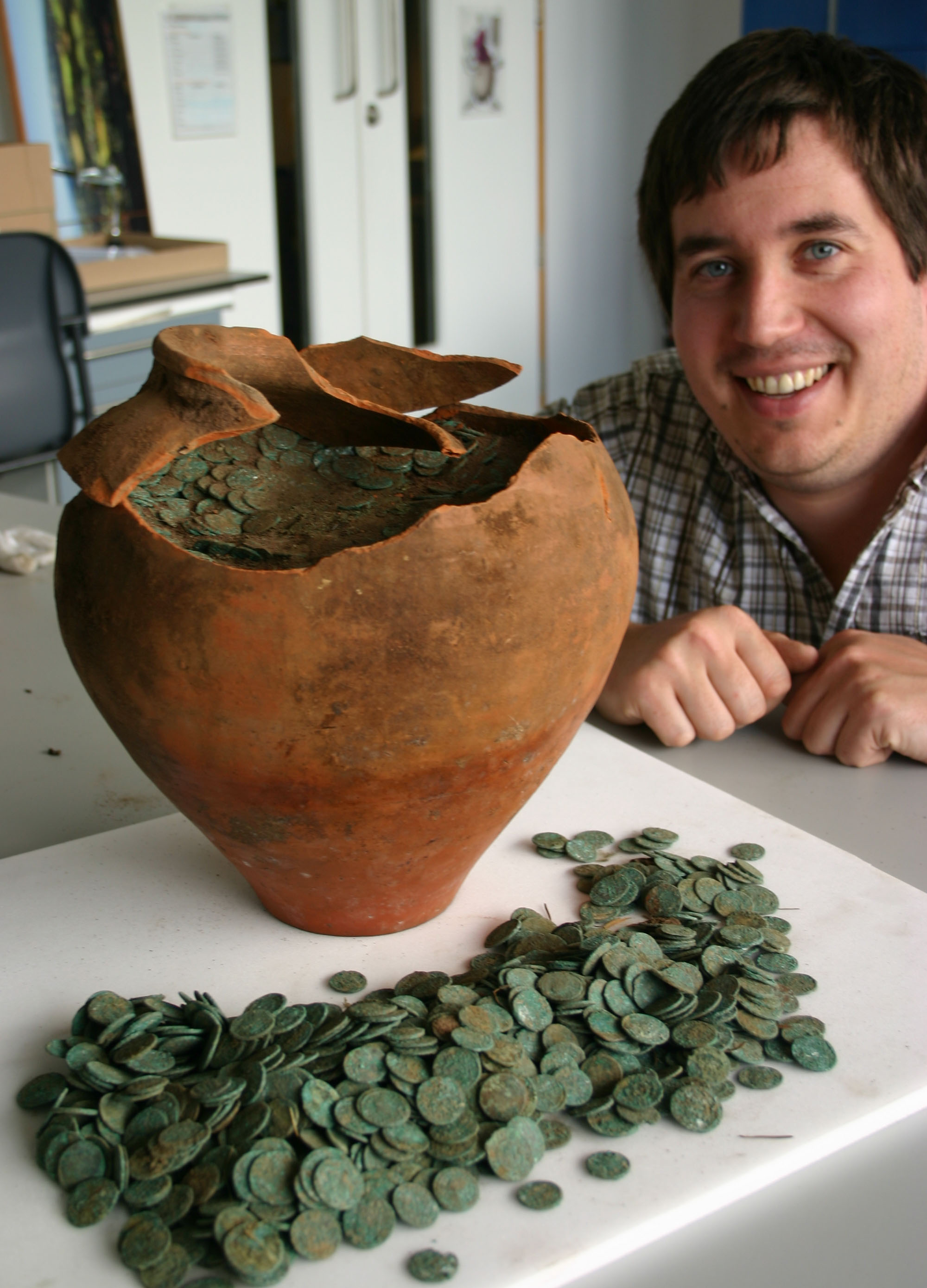
Finds Liaison Officer, Peter Reavill with the hoard

On 25 October 2011, a coroner's treasure inquest declared that the coins were treasure under the terms of the 1996 Treasure Act. The hoard will be valued by the Treasure Valuation Committee, and a reward will be paid to the landowner and the finder. Normally, the market value of the hoard, as determined by the Treasure Valuation Committee, would be shared equally by the landowner and the finder, but under the terms of the 1996 Treasure Act, if the treasure was discovered whilst trespassing (as was the case with the Shrewsbury Hoard) the finder may get a reduced reward or no reward at all.

Shropshire County Council Museum Service acquired the hoard (Museum accession number: SHRMS:2013.00) and as of May 2021 it is on permanent display in the Roman gallery at the Shrewsbury Museum and Art Gallery.

== See also ==
- List of hoards in Britain
- Roman currency
