= William Ormsby-Gore (1779–1860) =

British politician

William Ormsby-Gore (14 March 1779 – 4 May 1860), known as William Gore until 1815, was a British Member of Parliament.

== Life ==
Born into an Anglo-Irish family as William Gore, the eldest son of William Gore, M.P., of Woodford, County Leitrim, he was the great-great-grandson of William Gore, third and youngest son of Sir Arthur Gore, 1st Baronet, of Newtown, second son of Sir Paul Gore, 1st Baronet, of Magharabag, whose eldest son Paul was the grandfather of Arthur Gore, 1st Earl of Arran. He was educated at Eton College (1796), the Middle Temple (1796) and Merton College, Oxford, where he matriculated in 1797. In 1815, he married Mary Jane Ormsby, daughter and heiress of Owen Ormsby. He assumed by Royal licence the additional surname of Ormsby the same year.

He joined the British Army and served as a lieutenant in the 1st Dragoon Guards in 1800, was promoted to captain in 1802, to major in 1802 and to brevet major in 1813. He went onto half-pay with the 86th Foot in 1815 and as a captain in the 88th Foot. He left the Army in 1829. He was appointed High Sheriff of Shropshire for 1817–18 and High Sheriff of Caernarvonshire for 1820–21.

Ormsby-Gore was elected to the House of Commons for County Leitrim in 1806, a seat he held until 1807, and then represented Caernarvon from 1830 to 1831 and North Shropshire from 1835 to 1857.

He died at Porkington and was buried at Selattyn. He had 3 sons (one of whom predeceased him) and 2 daughters. His eldest son John Ormsby Gore was M.P. for Caernarvonshire and created Baron Harlech in 1876. His second son William became 2nd Baron Harlech after the death of his brother.

Parliament of the United Kingdom
| Preceded by Peter La Touche; Henry John Clements | Member of Parliament for County Leitrim; 1806–1807; With: Henry John Clements | Succeeded by Henry John Clements; John La Touche |
| Preceded by Lord William Paget | Member of Parliament for Carnarvon; 1830–1831 | Succeeded by Sir Charles Paget |
| Preceded by Sir Rowland Hill; John Cotes | Member of Parliament for Shropshire North; 1837–1857; With: Sir Rowland Hill 1837–1843; Viscount Clive 1843–1848; John Whitehall Dod 1848–1857 | Succeeded by John Whitehall Dod; Rowland Clegg-Hill |
