= North Shropshire (constituency) =

UK Parliament constituency (since 1983)

Coordinates: 52.85°N 2.80°W

- County constituency for the House of Commons
- Boundaries since 2024
- Boundary of North Shropshire in West Midlands region
- County: Shropshire
- Electorate: 77,052 (2023)
- Major settlements: Wem, Whitchurch, Ellesmere, Oswestry and Market Drayton

Current constituency
- Created: 1983
- Member of Parliament: Helen Morgan (Liberal Democrats)
- Seats: One
- Created from: Oswestry and Wrekin

1832–1885
- Seats: Two
- Replaced by: Oswestry; Wellington; Newport

North Shropshire is a constituency in the county of Shropshire, represented in the House of Commons of the UK Parliament by Helen Morgan of the Liberal Democrats after a by-election on 16 December 2021, and retained by her with an increased majority in the 2024 general election. The former MP, Owen Paterson of the Conservatives, resigned his seat on 5 November 2021 when faced with suspension from the Commons for a breach of advocacy rules and the consequent possibility of a recall petition. The seat had previously been a safe seat for the Conservatives.

== Constituency profile ==
North Shropshire is a constituency in Shropshire in the West Midlands region of England. Its largest town is Oswestry, which has a population of around 18,000. Other settlements include the towns of Ellesmere, Wem, Whitchurch and Market Drayton and the villages of Gobowen and St Martin's.

This is a large, rural constituency with many historic market towns and small villages. It is largely agricultural, with dairy farming and brewing being important local industries. The constituency borders Wales to the north and west. Oswestry and its surroundings have a significant Welsh influence; many villages along the border have Welsh names and many residents identify as Welsh. The constituency has average levels of wealth and deprivation, and house prices are generally similar to the rest of the West Midlands region but lower than the UK average.

North Shropshire has a large retired population and a low proportion of young adults. Residents have average levels of education and high rates of homeownership. Rates of household income and child poverty are in line with national averages. A high proportion of residents work in the agriculture, retail and manufacturing sectors, and the percentage claiming unemployment benefits is low. White people made up 97% of the population at the 2021 census.

Most of the constituency is represented by Liberal Democrats at the local council, with some Reform UK councillors elected in St Martin's and Green Party councillors elected in Gobowen and part of Oswestry. Voters in North Shropshire strongly supported leaving the European Union in the 2016 referendum; an estimated 60% voted in favour of Brexit compared to the UK-wide figure of 52%.

== Boundaries ==
Context: 1832–1868. Extract from 1837 result: the central, doubly blue area.

1832–1885: The Hundreds of Oswestry, Pimhill, North Bradford and South Bradford, as well as the Liberty of Shrewsbury.

1983–1997: The District of North Shropshire, the Borough of Oswestry, and the District of The Wrekin wards of Church Aston, Edgmond, Ercall Magna, Newport East, Newport North, and Newport West.

1997–2024: The District of North Shropshire and the Borough of Oswestry.

The district councils of North Shropshire and Oswestry were abolished in 2009, but the constituency boundaries remained unaltered.

2024–present: The County of Shropshire electoral districts of: Ellesmere Urban; Gobowen, Selattyn and Weston Rhyn; Llanymynech; Market Drayton East; Market Drayton West; Oswestry East; Oswestry South; Oswestry West; Prees; Ruyton and Baschurch; St. Martin’s; St. Oswald; Shawbury; The Meres; Wem; Whitchurch North; Whitchurch South; Whittington.

The constituency was reduced in size to bring the electorate within the permitted range by transferring the electoral districts of Cheswardine and Hodnet to The Wrekin.

== History ==
From its first creation in 1832 to the abolition of the first creation in 1885 the constituency covered approximately half of the county and elected two members, formally Knights of the Shire. In 1885 the county was (together with South Shropshire) divided between four constituencies: Ludlow, Newport, Oswestry and Wellington.

In 1983 the constituency was revived in a smaller form as the successor to the Oswestry seat and elects one Member of Parliament (MP) by the first past the post system of election.

Its first MP was John Biffen, who had been MP for Oswestry since a 1961 byelection. He served in various cabinet roles under Margaret Thatcher from 1979 until he fell out of favour after the 1987 general election. Biffen retired for the 1997 general election and was succeeded by fellow Conservative Owen Paterson.

Paterson was appointed as Secretary of State for Northern Ireland in May 2010 and from the September 2012 Cabinet reshuffle, Secretary of State for Environment, Food and Rural Affairs, until another reshuffle in June 2014. Paterson resigned as an MP in November 2021 for breaching Commons lobbying rules while working for two firms as a consultant. A by-election was held on 16 December 2021, triggered by the resignation and was won by Helen Morgan for the Liberal Democrats with a 34% swing. The swing was seventh largest in United Kingdom by-election history.

In December 2023, the Labour Party included the seat in its published list of 211 non-battleground seats, indicating they did not see it as necessary to win in order to gain a majority at the 2024 general election, when it was retained by Helen Morgan on a further swing to the Liberal Democrats. Compared to the notional 2019 results the overall swing was 41.3%.

== Members of Parliament ==
=== MPs 1832–1885 ===
- Constituency created in 1832

Election	First member	First party	Second member	Second party
1832	Sir Rowland Hill, Bt	Tory	John Cotes	Whig
1834	Sir Rowland Hill, Bt	Conservative	John Cotes	Whig
1835	Sir Rowland Hill, Bt	Conservative	William Ormsby-Gore	Conservative
1843 by-election	Viscount Clive	Conservative	William Ormsby-Gore	Conservative
1848 by-election	John Whitehall Dod	Conservative	William Ormsby-Gore	Conservative
1857	John Whitehall Dod	Conservative	Hon. Rowland Hill	Conservative
1859	John Ormsby-Gore	Conservative	Hon. Rowland Hill	Conservative
1865	John Ormsby-Gore	Conservative	Hon. Charles Cust	Conservative
1866 by-election	John Ormsby-Gore	Conservative	Hon. Adelbert Brownlow-Cust	Conservative
1867 by-election	John Ormsby-Gore	Conservative	Viscount Newport	Conservative
1876 by-election	Stanley Leighton	Conservative	Viscount Newport	Conservative
1885	Constituency abolished			

=== MPs since 1983 ===
Oswestry and Wrekin prior to 1983

Election	Member	Party
1983	John Biffen	Conservative
1997	Owen Paterson	Conservative
2021 by-election	Helen Morgan	Liberal Democrats

== Elections ==
View source data.
Results over time

=== Elections in the 2020s ===
General election 2024: North Shropshire
Party	Candidate	Votes	%	±%
Liberal Democrats	Helen Morgan	26,214	52.9	+42.5
Conservative	Simon Baynes	10,903	22.0	−39.7
Reform	Mark Whittle	7,687	15.5	N/A
Labour	Natalie Rowley	3,423	6.9	−15.5
Green	Craig Emery	1,234	2.5	−0.8
Independent	Samuel Cladingbowl	133	0.3	N/A
Majority		15,311	30.9	N/A
Turnout		49,594	64.1	−3.8
Registered electors		77,573		
Liberal Democrats gain from Conservative		Swing	+41.3	

Vote share changes for the 2024 election are compared to the notional results from the 2019 election, not the 2021 by-election.

2021 North Shropshire by-election
Party	Candidate	Votes	%	±%
Liberal Democrats	Helen Morgan	17,957	47.2	+37.2
Conservative	Neil Shastri-Hurst	12,032	31.6	−31.1
Labour	Ben Wood	3,686	9.7	−12.4
Green	Duncan Kerr	1,738	4.6	+1.4
Reform	Kirsty Walmsley	1,427	3.8	New
UKIP	Andrea Allen	378	1.0	New
Reclaim	Martin Daubney	375	1.0	New
Monster Raving Loony	Alan "Howling Laud" Hope	118	0.3	N/A
Independent	Suzie Akers-Smith	95	0.2	New
Heritage	James Elliot	79	0.2	New
Rejoin EU	Boris Been Bunged	58	0.2	New
Freedom Alliance	Earl Jesse	57	0.1	New
Party Party	Russell Dean	19	0.1	New
No description	Yolande Kenward	3	0.0	New
Majority		5,925	15.6	N/A
Turnout		38,022	46.3	−21.6
Rejected ballots		74	0.2	
Registered electors		82,314		
Liberal Democrats gain from Conservative		Swing	+34.2	

=== Elections in the 2010s ===
General election 2019: North Shropshire
Party	Candidate	Votes	%	±%
Conservative	Owen Paterson	35,444	62.7	+2.2
Labour	Graeme Currie	12,495	22.1	−9.0
Liberal Democrats	Helen Morgan	5,643	10.0	+4.7
Green	John Adams	1,790	3.2	+0.1
Shropshire Party	Robert Jones	1,141	2.0	New
Majority		22,949	40.6	+11.2
Turnout		56,513	67.9	−1.1
Conservative hold		Swing	+5.6	

General election 2017: North Shropshire
Party	Candidate	Votes	%	±%
Conservative	Owen Paterson	33,642	60.5	+9.0
Labour	Graeme Currie	17,287	31.1	+11.2
Liberal Democrats	Tom Thornhill	2,948	5.3	−0.7
Green	Duncan Kerr	1,722	3.1	−1.8
Majority		16,355	29.4	−2.2
Turnout		55,599	69.0	+1.4
Conservative hold		Swing	-1.1	

General election 2015: North Shropshire
Party	Candidate	Votes	%	±%
Conservative	Owen Paterson	27,041	51.5	±0.0
Labour	Graeme Currie	10,457	19.9	+1.8
UKIP	Andrea Allen	9,262	17.6	+12.9
Liberal Democrats	Tom Thornhill	3,184	6.0	−14.9
Green	Duncan Kerr	2,575	4.9	+3.3
Majority		16,584	31.6	+1.0
Turnout		52,483	67.6	+0.9
Conservative hold		Swing	-0.9	

Class War originally selected Al Derby as a candidate here, but he changed to Wolverhampton North East.

General election 2010: North Shropshire
Party	Candidate	Votes	%	±%
Conservative	Owen Paterson	26,692	51.5	+1.9
Liberal Democrats	Ian Croll	10,864	20.9	+1.2
Labour	Ian McLaughlan	9,406	18.1	−7.8
UKIP	Sandra List	2,432	4.7	−0.1
BNP	Phil Reddall	1,667	3.2	New
Green	Steve Boulding	808	1.6	New
Majority		15,828	30.6	+6.9
Turnout		51,869	65.7	+4.3
Conservative hold		Swing	+0.3	

=== Elections in the 2000s ===
General election 2005: North Shropshire
Party	Candidate	Votes	%	±%
Conservative	Owen Paterson	23,061	49.6	+1.0
Labour	Sandra Samuels	12,041	25.9	−9.3
Liberal Democrats	Steve Bourne	9,175	19.7	+6.9
UKIP	Ian Smith	2,233	4.8	+2.3
Majority		11,020	23.7	+10.3
Turnout		46,510	61.4	−1.7
Conservative hold		Swing	+5.1	

General election 2001: North Shropshire
Party	Candidate	Votes	%	±%
Conservative	Owen Paterson	22,631	48.6	+8.4
Labour	Mike Ion	16,390	35.2	−0.8
Liberal Democrats	Ben Jephcott	5,945	12.8	−7.6
UKIP	David Trevanion	1,165	2.5	New
Independent	Russell Maxfield	389	0.8	New
Majority		6,241	13.4	+9.2
Turnout		46,520	63.1	−9.5
Conservative hold		Swing		

=== Elections in the 1990s ===
General election 1997: North Shropshire
Party	Candidate	Votes	%	±%
Conservative	Owen Paterson	20,730	40.2	
Labour	Ian Lucas	18,535	36.0	
Liberal Democrats	John Stevens	10,489	20.4	
Referendum	Denis Allen	1,764	3.4	New
Majority		2,195	4.2	
Turnout		51,518	72.6	
Conservative hold		Swing		

General election 1992: Shropshire North
Party	Candidate	Votes	%	±%
Conservative	John Biffen	32,443	50.5	−1.7
Liberal Democrats	John Stevens	16,232	25.3	−2.1
Labour	Bob Hawkins	15,550	24.2	+3.8
Majority		16,211	25.2	+0.4
Turnout		64,225	77.7	+2.2
Conservative hold		Swing	+0.2	

=== Elections in the 1980s ===
General election 1987: Shropshire North
Party	Candidate	Votes	%	±%
Conservative	John Biffen	30,385	52.2	−1.2
Liberal	Gordon Smith	15,970	27.4	−4.2
Labour	Bob Hawkins	11,866	20.4	+5.7
Majority		14,415	24.8	+3.0
Turnout		58,221	75.5	+2.8
Conservative hold		Swing		

General election 1983: Shropshire North
Party	Candidate	Votes	%	±%
Conservative	John Biffen	28,496	53.4	
Liberal	David Evans	16,829	31.6	
Labour	Helen Jones	7,860	14.7	
Independent For Referendum	J.L. Phillimore	135	0.3	
Majority		11,667	21.8	
Turnout		53,320	72.7	
Conservative win (new seat)				

=== Elections in the 1880s ===
General election 1880: Shropshire North (2 seats)
Party	Candidate	Votes	%	±%
Conservative	Stanley Leighton	Unopposed		
Conservative	George Bridgeman	Unopposed		
Registered electors		7,729		
Conservative hold				
Conservative hold				

=== Elections in the 1870s ===
1876 North Shropshire by-election (1 seat)
Party	Candidate	Votes	%	±%
Conservative	Stanley Leighton	2,737	50.3	N/A
Conservative	Salusbury Kynaston Mainwaring	2,700	49.7	N/A
Majority		37	0.6	N/A
Turnout		5,437	74.1	N/A
Registered electors		7,342		
Conservative hold				

- Caused by Gore's elevation to the peerage, becoming Lord Harlech.

General election 1874: Shropshire North (2 seats)
Party	Candidate	Votes	%	±%
Conservative	John Ormsby-Gore	Unopposed		
Conservative	George Bridgeman	Unopposed		
Registered electors		7,557		
Conservative hold				
Conservative hold				

=== Elections in the 1860s ===
General election 1868: Shropshire North (2 seats)
Party	Candidate	Votes	%	±%
Conservative	John Ormsby-Gore	3,602	38.2	N/A
Conservative	George Bridgeman	3,403	36.1	N/A
Liberal	Richard George Jebb	2,412	25.6	N/A
Majority		991	10.5	N/A
Turnout		5,915 (est)	77.7 (est)	N/A
Registered electors		7,611		
Conservative hold				
Conservative hold				

1867 North Shropshire by-election
Party	Candidate	Votes	%	±%
Conservative	George Bridgeman	Unopposed		
Conservative hold				

- Caused by Brownlow-Cust's elevation to the peerage, becoming 3rd Earl Brownlow.

1866 North Shropshire by-election
Party	Candidate	Votes	%	±%
Conservative	Adelbert Brownlow-Cust	Unopposed		
Conservative hold				

- Caused by Cust's resignation.

General election 1865: Shropshire North (2 seats)
Party	Candidate	Votes	%	±%
Conservative	John Ormsby-Gore	Unopposed		
Conservative	Charles Cust	Unopposed		
Registered electors		5,315		
Conservative hold				
Conservative hold				

=== Elections in the 1850s ===
General election 1859: Shropshire North (2 seats)
Party	Candidate	Votes	%	±%
Conservative	John Ormsby-Gore	Unopposed		
Conservative	Rowland Hill	Unopposed		
Registered electors		4,110		
Conservative hold				
Conservative hold				

General election 1857: Shropshire North (2 seats)
Party	Candidate	Votes	%	±%
Conservative	John Whitehall Dod	Unopposed		
Conservative	Rowland Hill	Unopposed		
Registered electors		4,227		
Conservative hold				
Conservative hold				

General election 1852: Shropshire North (2 seats)
Party	Candidate	Votes	%	±%
Conservative	John Whitehall Dod	Unopposed		
Conservative	William Ormsby-Gore	Unopposed		
Registered electors		4,685		
Conservative hold				
Conservative hold				

=== Elections in the 1840s ===
By-election, 16 February 1848: Shropshire North
Party	Candidate	Votes	%	±%
Conservative	John Whitehall Dod	Unopposed		
Conservative hold				

- Caused by Herbert's succession to the peerage, becoming 3rd Earl of Powis

General election 1847: Shropshire North (2 seats)
Party	Candidate	Votes	%	±%
Conservative	Edward Herbert	Unopposed		
Conservative	William Ormsby-Gore	Unopposed		
Registered electors		4,876		
Conservative hold				
Conservative hold				

By-election, 16 January 1843: Shropshire North
Party	Candidate	Votes	%	±%
Conservative	Edward Herbert	Unopposed		
Registered electors		4,876		
Conservative hold				

- Caused by Hill's succession to the peerage, becoming 2nd Viscount Hill

General election 1841: Shropshire North (2 seats)
Party	Candidate	Votes	%	±%
Conservative	Rowland Hill	Unopposed		
Conservative	William Ormsby-Gore	Unopposed		
Registered electors		5,075		
Conservative hold				
Conservative hold				

=== Elections in the 1830s ===
General election 1837: Shropshire North (2 seats)
Party	Candidate	Votes	%
Conservative	Rowland Hill	Unopposed	
Conservative	William Ormsby-Gore	Unopposed	
Registered electors		4,910	
Conservative hold			
Conservative hold			

General election 1835: Shropshire North (2 seats)
Party	Candidate	Votes	%
Conservative	Rowland Hill	Unopposed	
Conservative	William Ormsby-Gore	Unopposed	
Registered electors		4,653	
Conservative hold			
Conservative gain from Whig			

General election 1832: Shropshire North (2 seats)
Party	Candidate	Votes	%
Tory	Rowland Hill	2,981	41.7
Whig	John Cotes (1799-1874)	2,117	29.6
Tory	William Ormsby-Gore	2,045	28.6
Turnout		4,296	91.8
Registered electors		4,682	
Majority		864	12.1
Tory win (new seat)			
Majority		72	1.0
Whig win (new seat)			

== See also ==
- North Shropshire by-election (disambiguation)
- Parliamentary constituencies in Shropshire
- List of parliamentary constituencies in West Midlands (region)

== Sources ==
- UK Polling Report
- Craig, F. W. S. (1989) [1977]. British parliamentary election results 1832–1885 (2nd ed.). Chichester: Parliamentary Research Services. pp. 446–447. ISBN 0-900178-26-4.
