= John Whitehall Dod =

British politician

Member of Parliament for North Shropshire
- In office 16 February 1848 – 3 May 1859 Serving with Rowland Clegg-Hill (1857–1859); William Ormsby-Gore (1848–1857)
- Preceded by: Edward Herbert; William Ormsby-Gore
- Succeeded by: Rowland Clegg-Hill; John Ormsby-Gore

Personal details
- Born: 17 September 1797 Calverhall, Shropshire, England
- Died: 8 July 1863 (aged 66)
- Party: Conservative

John Whitehall Dod (17 September 1797 – 8 July 1863) was a British Conservative politician.

John Whitehall Dod was born on 17 September 1797, in Calverhall Shropshire to John and Eleanor Dod

== Parliamentary career ==
Dod was first elected Conservative MP for North Shropshire at a by-election in 1848—caused by the succession of Edward Herbert as the 3rd Earl of Powis—and held the seat until 1859 when he did not stand for re-election.

Parliament of the United Kingdom
Preceded by Edward Herbert; William Ormsby-Gore	Member of Parliament for North Shropshire; 1848–1859; With: Rowland Clegg-Hill (1857–1859); William Ormsby-Gore (1848–1857)	Succeeded by Rowland Clegg-Hill; John Ormsby-Gore
