= Rowland Clegg-Hill, 3rd Viscount Hill =

British Conservative politician

Rowland Clegg-Hill, 3rd Viscount Hill (5 December 1833 – 30 March 1895), known as Rowland Hill until 1872, was a British Conservative politician.

== Background ==
Born Rowland Clegg Hill, at Hawkstone Hall, Shropshire, he was the son of Rowland Hill, 2nd Viscount Hill, and Anne, daughter of Joseph Clegg. In 1874 he assumed by Royal licence the additional surname of Clegg before that of Hill. He was educated at Shrewsbury School.

== Military service ==
Hill was commissioned as cornet in the North Shropshire Yeomanry Cavalry in 1853, and captain in 1866. He continued to serve within the unified Shropshire Yeomanry regiment formed by amalgamation in 1872, and was promoted major in 1875. He resigned in 1879.

== Political career ==
Hill sat as Conservative Member of Parliament for North Shropshire between 1857 and 1865. In 1875, he succeeded his father in the viscountcy and entered the House of Lords. His ability to sit in the Lords was curtailed in later years by ill health and being adjudged bankrupt in July 1894 with debts of almost £250,000.

He was also a deputy lieutenant and justice of the peace (JP) for the county of Shropshire.

== Sporting life ==
Hill succeeded his father as Master of the Shropshire Fox Hounds, and refounded the Hawkstone Otter Hunt Club in 1870, becoming its Master and continuing until 1891. The Hawkstone Otter Hunt was originally started about 1800 by the 1st Viscount and maintained within the family.

== Personal life ==
Hill was twice married.

He married firstly, in London, Mary Madax, daughter of William Madax of Gosport, Hampshire, on 3 May 1855. Before their marriage she worked as his mother's still room maid and for some time the marriage was unacknowledged. She died in 1874, having borne him two sons, Rowland Richard and Francis William Clegg-Hill, later respectively 4th and 5th Viscounts Hill.

He married secondly, in April 1876, Isabella Elizabeth Wynn, daughter of Spencer Bulkeley Wynn, 3rd Baron Newborough, of Rug, Caernarvonshire. The marriage took place at Rug Chapel, and it was claimed that over a thousand people were unable to get into the church to attend the service. Isabella survived her husband, dying in 1908. The couple had one daughter and three sons, the eldest of whom, Charles Rowland Clegg-Hill, later succeeded as 6th Viscount Hill.

Lord Hill died at Hawkstone Hall in March 1895, aged 61, and was buried in the family vault at the parish church in Hodnet. He was succeeded in his titles by his eldest son, Rowland Richard Clegg-Hill.

Parliament of the United Kingdom
Preceded by William Ormsby-Gore; John Whitehall Dod	Member of Parliament for Shropshire North; 1857–1865; With: John Whitehall Dod 1857–1859; John Ormsby-Gore 1859–1865	Succeeded by John Ormsby-Gore; Hon. Charles Cust
Peerage of the United Kingdom
Preceded by Rowland Hill	Viscount Hill; 1875–1895	Succeeded by Rowland Richard Clegg-Hill
