= Charles Cust =

British soldier and politician

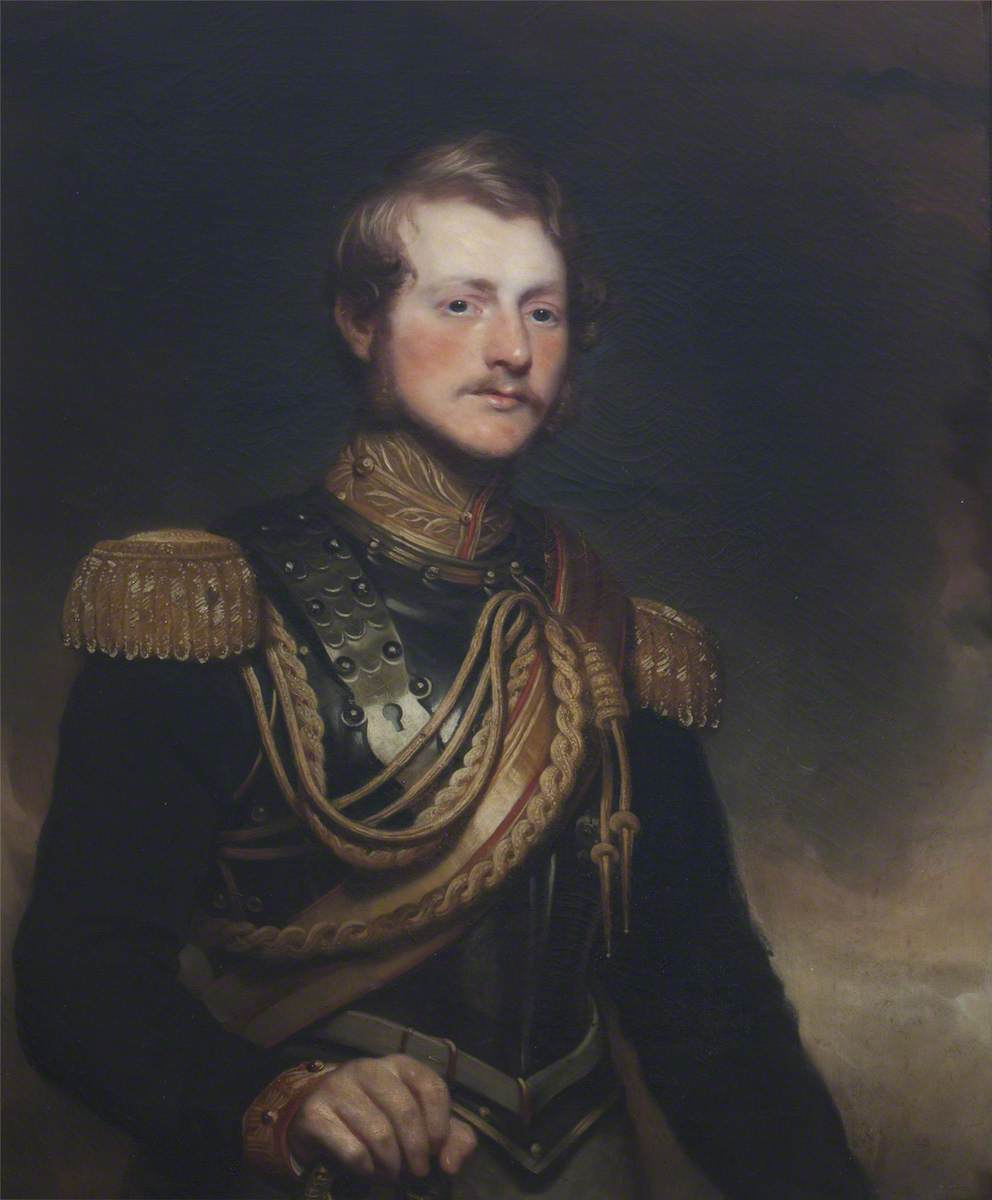
- Portrait by Martin Archer Shee, circa 1840

Member of Parliament for Shropshire North
- In office 1865–1866

High Sheriff of Northamptonshire
- In office 1859

Personal details
- Born: 27 September 1813
- Died: 19 May 1875 (aged 61)
- Party: Conservative
- Spouse: Caroline Macdonald (m. 1842)
- Parent: John Cust (father)
- Relatives: Egerton family John Egerton (brother); Adelbert Brownlow-Cust (nephew)
- Military career
- Allegiance: Great Britain
- Rank: Captain
- Unit: Royal Horse Guards

Hon. Charles Henry Cust (27 September 1813 – 19 May 1875) was a British soldier and Conservative politician.

== Background ==
Cust was the second son of John Cust, 1st Earl Brownlow, and his first wife Sophia, daughter of Sir Abraham Hume, 2nd Baronet. John Egerton, Viscount Alford, was his elder brother.

== Military and political career ==
Cust was a Captain in the Royal Horse Guards. In 1859 he was appointed High Sheriff of Northamptonshire and in 1865 was returned to Parliament for Shropshire North. He held the seat only until the following year, when he was succeeded by his nephew, Adelbert Brownlow-Cust.

== Family ==
Cust married Caroline, daughter of Reginald George Macdonald, in 1842. He died in May 1875, aged 61. Caroline died in October 1887.

Parliament of the United Kingdom
Preceded by Rowland Hill; John Ormsby-Gore	Member of Parliament for Shropshire North; 1865–1866; With: John Ormsby-Gore	Succeeded by John Ormsby-Gore; Adelbert Brownlow-Cust
