= Edward Herbert, 3rd Earl of Powis =

British peer and politician

The Right Honourable The Earl of Powis
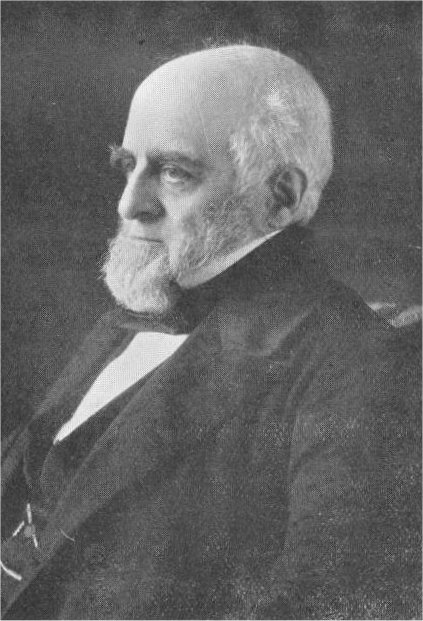

Member of Parliament for North Shropshire
- In office 1843–1848 Serving with William Ormsby-Gore
- Preceded by: Sir Rowland Hill; William Ormsby-Gore
- Succeeded by: William Ormsby-Gore; John Whitehall Dod

Personal details
- Born: 5 November 1818 The Angel Hotel, Pershore, Worcestershire, England
- Died: 7 May 1891 (aged 72) Berkeley Square, Mayfair, London, England
- Resting place: St Mary's Church, Welshpool, Wales
- Party: Conservative
- Parent(s): Edward Herbert, 2nd Earl of Powis; Lady Lucy Graham

Edward James Herbert, 3rd Earl of Powis (5 November 1818 – 7 May 1891), styled Viscount Clive between 1839 and 1848, was a British peer and politician.

== Background ==
Powis was born at The Angel Hotel, Pershore, Worcestershire, the eldest son of Edward Herbert, 2nd Earl of Powis, and Lady Lucy, daughter of James Graham, 3rd Duke of Montrose. Sir Percy Egerton Herbert was his younger brother and also a Member of Parliament.

== Education ==
He was educated at Eton College and St John's College, Cambridge, where he was president of the University Pitt Club, and he graduated as MA in 1840 and LLD in 1848. He was also awarded an honorary degree as DCL by Oxford University. Whilst at Cambridge he played in two first-class cricket matches for the Cambridge Town Club against Cambridge University Cricket Club.

He was later appointed High Steward of Cambridge University in 1863.

He was also President of the Powysland Club, founded in 1867, dedicated to the study of Montgomeryshire's history and other aspects of the county.

== Political career ==
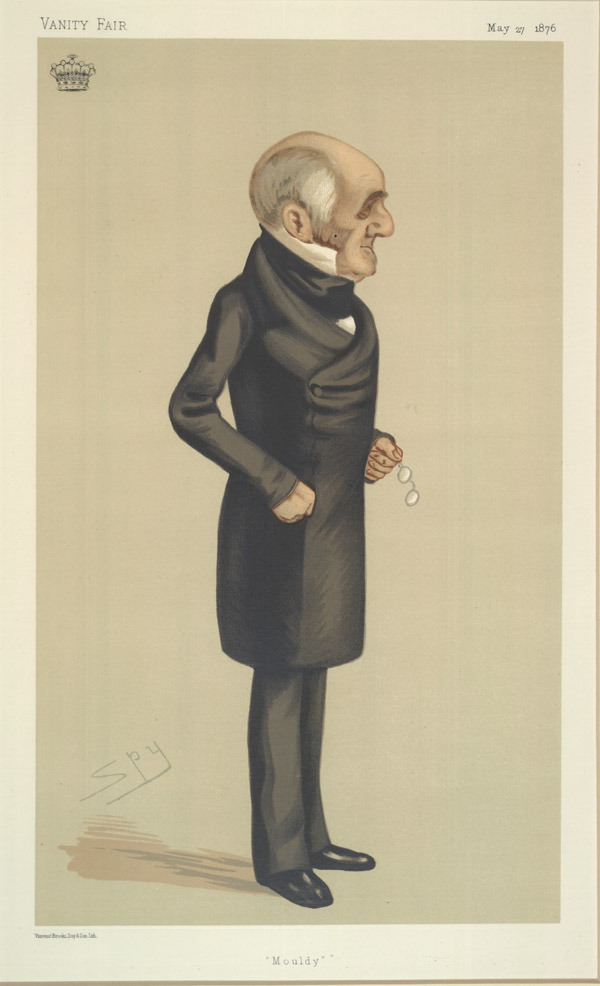
1876 Vanity Fair caricature of the Earl of Powis by Spy.

Powis was returned to Parliament as one of two MPs for Shropshire North in 1843, a seat he held until 1848, when he succeeded his father in the earldom and entered the House of Lords.

Paternally great-grandson of Clive of India and grandson of a former Governor of Madras (Edward Clive, 1st Earl of Powis), the Earl was offered the Viceroyalty of India by then Prime Minister Disraeli in 1875, when aged 67, but declined, fearing his health "would not be suited to the rigours of the tropical climate". On the preserved envelope of the letter he scrawled, "Not worth considering - Powis."

From the formation of County Councils in 1889, he was County Alderman for Shropshire and County Councillor for Montgomeryshire.

He also served as Lord Lieutenant of Montgomeryshire from 1877 to 1891, and was J.P. for the counties of Shropshire and Herefordshire.

== Military service ==
Powis (then Viscount Clive) was commissioned a cornet in the South Salopian Yeomanry Cavalry in 1840, and was captain by his father's death in 1848, when he succeeded him as colonel commanding the regiment. He remained in command until resigning in 1871, aged 63.

== Business Interests ==
Powis was chairman of the Shropshire Union Railways and Canal Company and of Welshpool Gas Company, who provided gas-lighting in Welshpool town.

== Personal life ==
Lord Powis died at his London home at 45 Berkeley Square, Mayfair, in May 1891, aged 72, and was buried at St Mary's Church, Welshpool. He was unmarried and was succeeded in the earldom by his nephew, George.

Parliament of the United Kingdom
Preceded by Sir Rowland Hill; William Ormsby-Gore	Member of Parliament for North Shropshire; 1843–1848; With: William Ormsby-Gore	Succeeded by William Ormsby-Gore; John Whitehall Dod
Honorary titles
Preceded by The Lord Sudeley	Lord Lieutenant of Montgomeryshire; 1877–1891	Succeeded by Sir Herbert Williams-Wynn, Bt
Peerage of the United Kingdom
Preceded by Edward Herbert	Earl of Powis; 1848–1891	Succeeded by George Charles Herbert
