= Adelbert Brownlow-Cust, 3rd Earl Brownlow =

British soldier, courtier and Conservative politician

The Right Honourable The Earl Brownlow GCVO VD PC DL JP
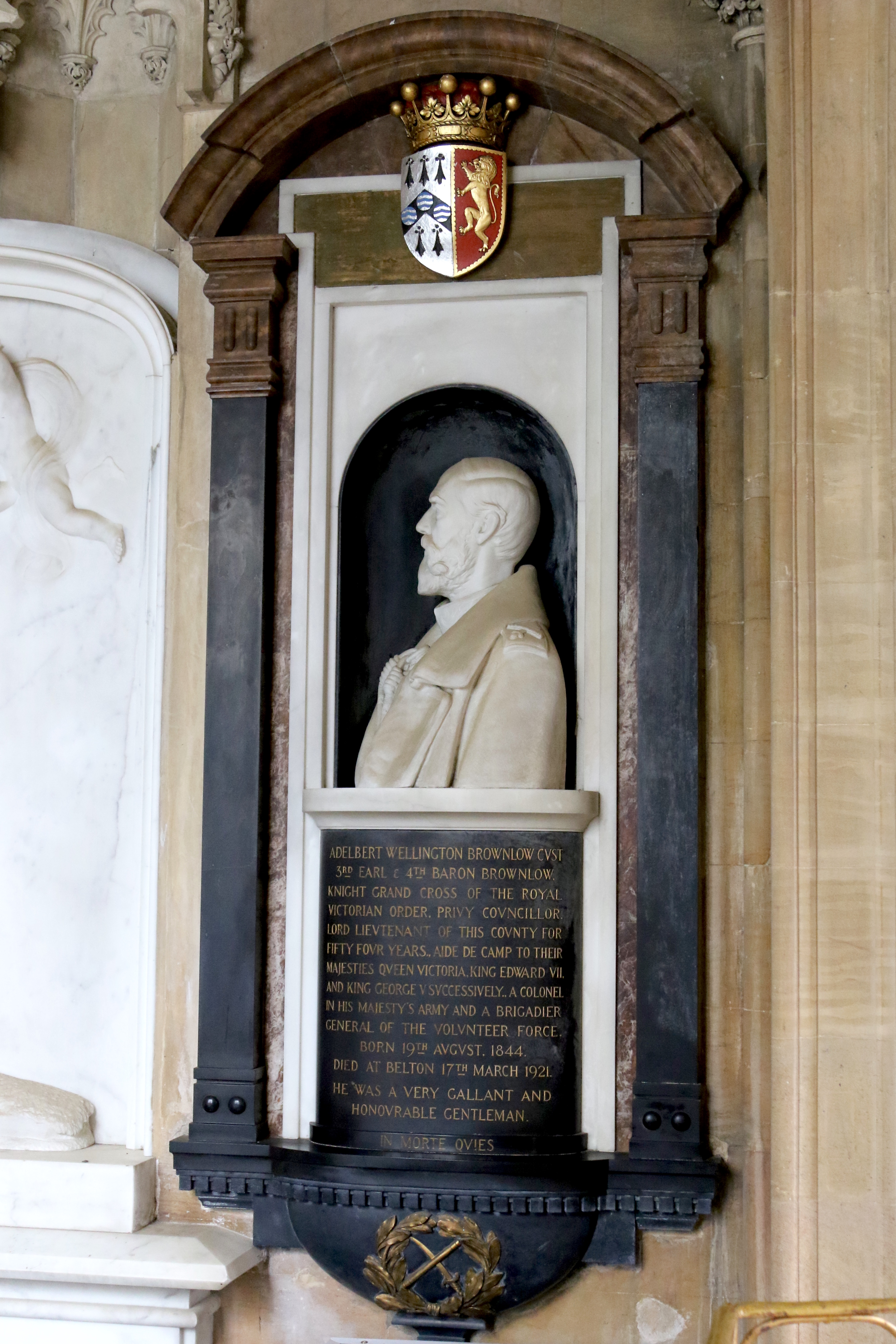
- Memorial in St Peter and St Paul's Church, Belton

Paymaster General
- In office March 1887 – 1889
- Monarch: Queen Victoria
- Prime Minister: The Marquess of Salisbury
- Preceded by: The Earl Beauchamp
- Succeeded by: The Earl of Jersey

Under-Secretary of State for War
- In office 1 January 1890 – 11 August 1892
- Monarch: Queen Victoria
- Prime Minister: The Marquess of Salisbury
- Preceded by: The Lord Harris
- Succeeded by: The Lord Sandhurst

Personal details
- Born: 19 August 1844 Lowndes Street, London
- Died: 17 March 1921 (aged 76) Belton, Lincolnshire
- Party: Conservative
- Spouse: Lady Adelaide Chetwynd-Talbot (1844–1917)
- Parent(s): John Egerton, Viscount Alford; Lady Marianne Margaret Compton

Adelbert Wellington Brownlow-Cust, 3rd Earl Brownlow GCVO VD PC DL JP (19 August 1844 – 17 March 1921), was a British soldier, courtier and Conservative politician.

== Background and education ==
Brownlow was the second son of John Egerton, Viscount Alford, eldest son and heir apparent of John Cust, 1st Earl Brownlow. His mother was Lady Marianne Margaret, daughter of Spencer Compton, 2nd Marquess of Northampton, generally known as Lady Marian Alford. His father had predeceased his own father in 1851 when Adelbert was only seven years old and thus the earldom and estates had passed to Adelbert's elder brother. Adelbert was educated at Eton.

== Political career ==
In 1866 Brownlow was elected to the House of Commons for North Shropshire. However, he was forced to resign his seat the following year when he succeeded in the earldom of Brownlow (and viscountcy of Alford) on the death of his older brother, and entered the House of Lords. He held office under Lord Salisbury as Parliamentary Secretary to the Local Government Board from 1885 to 1886, as Paymaster General from 1887 to 1889 and as Under-Secretary of State for War from 1889 to 1892 and was admitted to the Privy Council in 1887.

Apart from his political career he was also Lord Lieutenant of Lincolnshire from 1867 to 1921, a deputy lieutenant for Hertfordshire and a justice of the peace for Shropshire, Hertfordshire, Lincolnshire and Buckinghamshire. He served as treasurer of the Salop Infirmary in Shrewsbury in 1872.

== Military career ==
Brownlow served with the Grenadier Guards as lieutenant from 1863 to 1866, and was later commanding officer of the Bedfordshire Volunteer Infantry Brigade between 1889 and 1892, and Home Counties Brigade in 1895. He was Honorary Colonel of the 4th Battalion of the Lincolnshire Regiment from 1868 to 1908, of the 2nd Volunteer Battalion of the Bedfordshire Regiment from 1883 to 1901, and of the Lincolnshire Yeomanry and 4th Volunteer Battalion of the Hertfordshire Regiment from 1901. He was awarded the Volunteer Decoration.

== Courtier ==
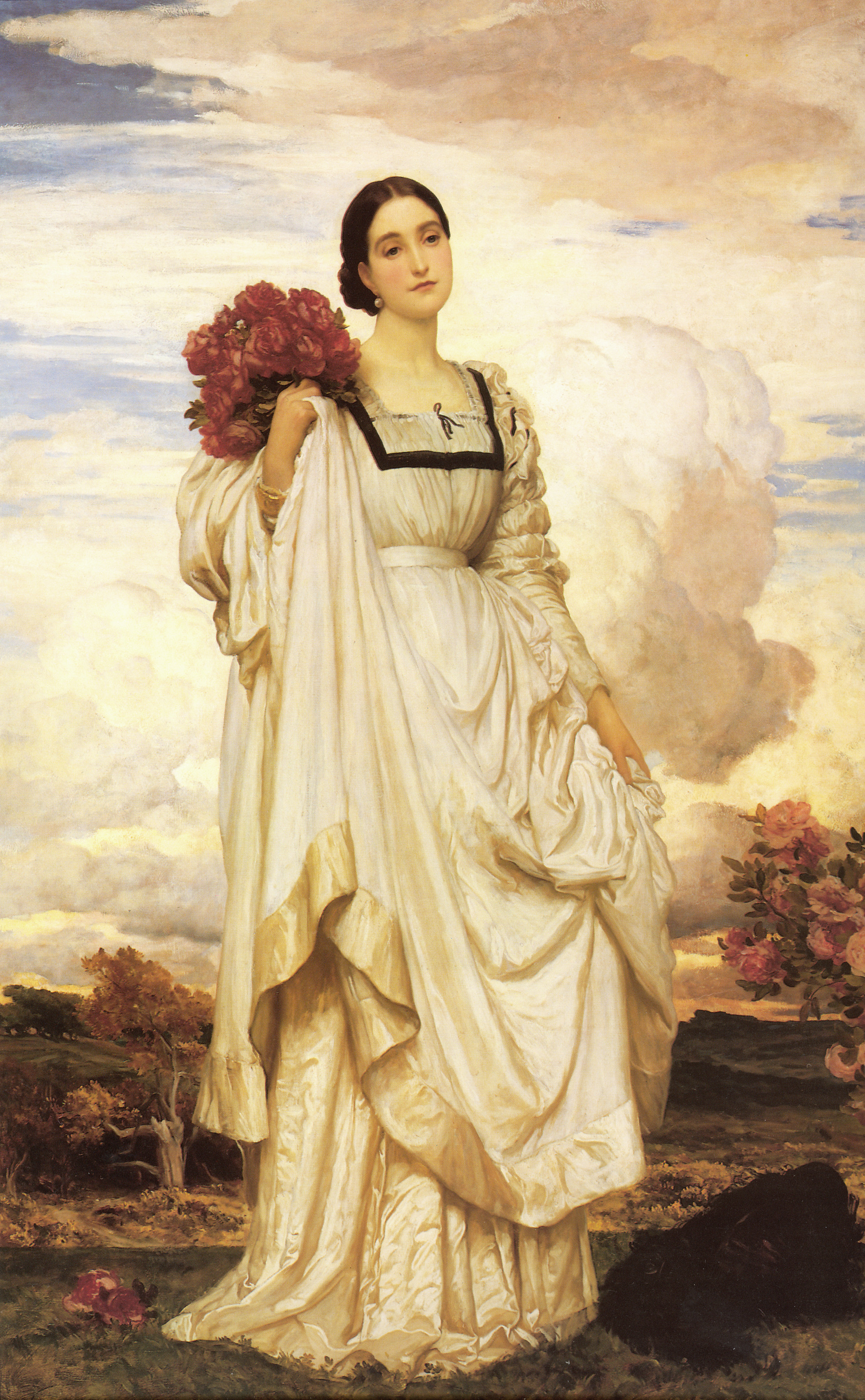
The Countess Brownlow by Frederic Leighton, 1879.

Brownlow was a Volunteer Aide-de-Camp to Queen Victoria, Edward VII and George V. He was appointed a Knight Grand Cross of the Royal Victorian Order (GCVO) in the 1921 New Year Honours for his services to the Royal Household.

== Family ==
Lord Brownlow married Lady Adelaide Chetwynd-Talbot, daughter of Henry Chetwynd-Talbot, 18th Earl of Shrewsbury, in 1868. They had no children. She died in March 1917, aged 73. Lord Brownlow survived her by four years and died in March 1921, aged 75. On his death the Earldom of Brownlow and Viscountcy of Alford became extinct while he was succeeded in his barony and baronetcy by his second cousin, Adelbert Cust.

Parliament of the United Kingdom
Preceded by John Ormsby-Gore; Charles Cust	Member of Parliament for North Shropshire; 1866–1867; With: John Ormsby-Gore	Succeeded by John Ormsby-Gore; Viscount Newport
Political offices
Preceded by George W. E. Russell	Parliamentary Secretary to the Local Government Board; 1885–1886	Succeeded by Jesse Collings
Preceded by The Earl Beauchamp	Paymaster General; 1887–1889	Succeeded by The Earl of Jersey
Preceded by The Lord Harris	Under-Secretary of State for War; 1889–1892	Succeeded by The Lord Sandhurst
Honorary titles
Preceded by The Lord Aveland	Lord Lieutenant of Lincolnshire; 1867–1921	Succeeded by The Earl of Yarborough
Peerage of the United Kingdom
Preceded by John Egerton-Cust	Earl Brownlow; 1867–1921	Extinct
Peerage of Great Britain
Preceded by John Egerton-Cust	Baron Brownlow; 1867–1921	Succeeded by Adelbert Cust
