= John Ormsby-Gore, 1st Baron Harlech =

British peer and politician

John Ralph Ormsby-Gore, 1st Baron Harlech (3 June 1816 – 15 June 1876), was a British peer and Conservative Member of Parliament.

== Biography ==
Lord Harlech was the eldest son of William Ormsby-Gore, an Anglo-Irish aristocrat, and Mary Jane Ormsby. He was elected to the House of Commons for Carnarvonshire in 1837, a seat he held until 1841, and later represented North Shropshire from 1859 to 1876.

On 14 January 1876, he was raised to the peerage as Baron Harlech, of Harlech in the County of Merioneth, with remainder to his brother William in the absence of male heirs.

== Marriage and children ==
Lord Harlech married Sarah, daughter of Sir John Tyrell, 2nd Baronet, on 4 June 1844. They had one child:

- Hon. Fanny Mary Katherine Ormsby-Gore (born 1845, died 25 November 1927)

Lord Harlech died on 15 June 1876, aged 60, having held the title for only five months. As he had no son, he was succeeded according to the special remainder by his brother William.

Lady Harlech died in 1898.

== Coat of arms ==
Coat of arms of John Ormsby-Gore, 1st Baron Harlech
Notes Coat of arms of the Ormsby-Gore family Coronet A coronet of a Baron Crest 1st: an Heraldic Tiger rampant Argent; 2nd: a Dexter Arm embowed in armour proper holding in the hand a Man's Leg also in armour couped at the thigh Escutcheon Quarterly: 1st and 4th, Gules a Fess between three Cross Crosslets fitchy Or (Gore); 2nd and 3rd, Gules a Bend between six Cross Crosslets Or (Ormsby) Supporters Dexter: an Heraldic Tiger Argent maned and tufted Sable ducally gorged Or; Sinister: a Lion Or Motto In Hoc Signo Vinces (Under this sign thou shalt conquer)

Parliament of the United Kingdom
Preceded by Thomas Assheton Smith	Member of Parliament for Caernarvonshire; 1837–1841	Succeeded by Edward Douglas-Pennant
Preceded by John Whitehall Dod; Hon. Rowland Hill	Member of Parliament for Shropshire North; 1859–1876; With: Hon. Rowland Hill 1859–1865; Hon. Charles Cust 1865–1866; Hon. Adelbert Cust 1866–1867; Viscount Newport 1867–1876	Succeeded by Viscount Newport; Stanley Leighton
Peerage of the United Kingdom
New creation	Baron Harlech; 1876	Succeeded by William Ormsby-Gore
