= Rowland Hill, 2nd Viscount Hill =

British politician (1800–1875)

Rowland Hill, 2nd Viscount Hill (10 May 1800 – 3 January 1875), known as Sir Rowland Hill, Bt, between 1824 and 1842, was a British peer and Tory politician.

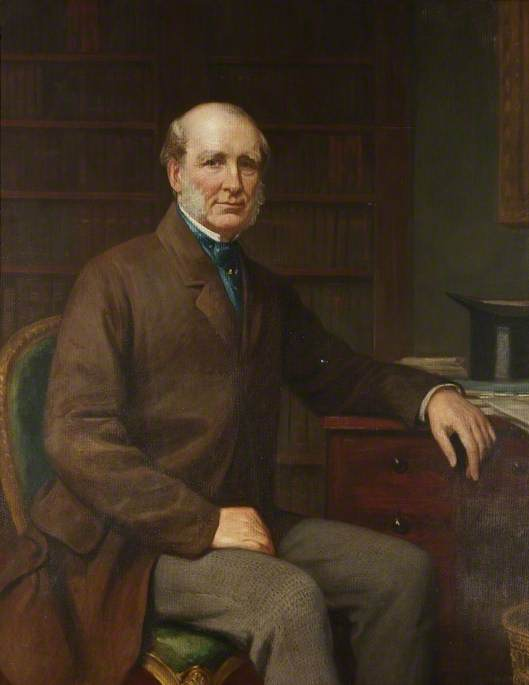
Rowland Hill by Eden Upton Eddis (Shropshire Museums Collection)

== Background ==
Hill was the son of Colonel John Hill, eldest son of Sir John Hill, 3rd Baronet. His mother was Elizabeth, daughter of Philip Cornish Rhodes, while the renowned military figures Rowland Hill, 1st Viscount Hill, Sir Robert Hill, Clement Hill and Sir Thomas Hill were his uncles. He was educated at Oriel College, Oxford, where he graduated MA in 1820.

== Political career ==
Hill was returned to Parliament for Shropshire in 1821, a seat he held until 1832, when the constituency was abolished. He then represented North Shropshire between 1832 and 1842. He succeeded his grandfather as fourth Baronet of Hawkstone in 1824. In 1842 he also succeeded his uncle as second Viscount Hill according to a special remainder in the letters patent and was able to take a seat in the House of Lords. Between 1845 and 1875 he served as Lord Lieutenant of Shropshire.

== Military career ==
Hill served as cornet in the Royal Horse Guards from 1820 to 1824, the year he succeeded to the baronetcy. He also succeeded his father in command, as lieutenant-colonel, of the North Shropshire Yeomanry Cavalry. As Lord Lieutenant, he consented to its amalgamation with the South Salopian Yeomanry Cavalry to form a single Shropshire Yeomanry regiment in 1872. He took command of the new regiment, which he held until his death.

== Family ==
Lord Hill married Anne, daughter of Joseph Clegg, of Peplow Hall, Shropshire, and granddaughter and heiress of Arthur Clegg, of Irwell, Lancashire, in 1831. He died in January 1875, aged 74, and was buried in the family vault at St Luke's parish church, Hodnet. He was succeeded by his son, Rowland. A younger son, Geoffrey, was a first-class cricketer. Lady Hill died in October 1891.

== Public memorial ==
A statue of him which was erected "by his tenants and friends" originally in the grounds of Hawkstone Hall was, following the breakup of the Hawkstone estate, offered to Shrewsbury town by his grandson Rowland Richard Clegg-Hill (the 4th Viscount) in 1907. It now stands in the Abbey Gardens in Abbey Foregate, Shrewsbury.

Parliament of the United Kingdom
Preceded by Sir John Powell, Bt; John Cotes	Member of Parliament for Shropshire; 1821–1832; With: Sir John Powell, Bt 1821–1822; John Cressett-Pelham 1822–1832	Constituency abolished
New constituency	Member of Parliament for North Shropshire; 1832–1842; With: John Cotes 1832–1835; William Ormsby-Gore 1835–1842	Succeeded by William Ormsby-Gore; Viscount Clive
Honorary titles
Preceded by The Duke of Sutherland	Lord Lieutenant of Shropshire; 1845–1875	Succeeded by The Earl of Bradford
Peerage of the United Kingdom
Preceded by Rowland Hill	Viscount Hill; 1842–1875	Succeeded by Rowland Clegg-Hill
Baronetage of Great Britain
Preceded by John Hill	Baronet (of Hawkestone); 1824–1875	Succeeded by Rowland Clegg-Hill
