= John Lewis (typographer) =

John Lewis (1912–1996) was a Welsh typographer, printer, illustrator and collector of printed ephemera.

== Early life ==
Lewis was born in Rhoose, near Cardiff. The family moved to Farnham in 1920. He was educated at Charterhouse and Goldsmiths', where his contemporaries included Denton Welch and Carel Weight.

== First career ==
Lewis set up as a freelance illustrator in 1935, but when the United Kingdom entered the Second World War, he became involved with developing camouflage working in Canada and doing some work on secret devices in Italy. Through this work he met Victor Stiebel, Oliver Messel, Gabriel White, Lynton Lamb and Edward Ardizzone who was to become his brother-in-law.

== Work with W. S. Cowell Ltd ==
Lewis joined W. S. Cowell Ltd. in 1946. The company published his first book, A Handbook of Printing Types with Notes on the Composition and Graphic Processes used by Cowells in 1947. The book featured illustrations by Henry Moore, John Piper, Blair Hughes-Stanton, John Nash. Barnett Freedman, Edward Bawden, and Graham Sutherland, as well as a weather chart by the Isotype Institute.

== Teaching career ==
From 1951 to 1963 he taught graphic design at the Royal College of Art. With Michael Twyman and Maurice Rickards, he was a pioneer in the study of printed ephemera, and in 1962 published the first major book in the field, Printed Ephemera: The Changing Uses of Type and Letterforms in English and American Printing.

In the 1960s Lewis also edited the influential Studio Vista/Van Nostrand Reinhold Art Paperbacks series for Studio Vista in the UK and Van Nostrand Reinhold in the US, including authors such as Peter Cook, Theo Crosby, Alan Fletcher, Ken Garland, Bob Gill, Norman Potter, David Pye, Paul Rand and Alison and Peter Smithson.

The John Lewis Printing Collection of more than 20,000 items from the fifteenth to the twentieth century is held at Reading University.

== Selected works ==
- 1947 A Handbook of Printing Types, Ipswich: W. S. Cowell Ltd.
- 1954 Graphic Design: with special reference to lettering, typography and illustration
- 1962 Printed Ephemera: the changing uses of type and letterforms in English and American printing, Ipswich, Suffolk: W. S. Cowell Ltd.
- 1964 (with Bob Gill) Illustration: aspects and directions
- 1965 Typography: basic principles
- 1966 Handbook of Type and Illustration
- 1967 The Twentieth Century Book: its illustration and design
- 1976 Collecting Printed Ephemera: a background to social habits and social history, to eating and drinking, to travel and heritage
- 1978 Typography: design and practice
- 1994 Such Things Happen: the life of a typographer
