= John Nash (architect) =

British architect (1752–1835)

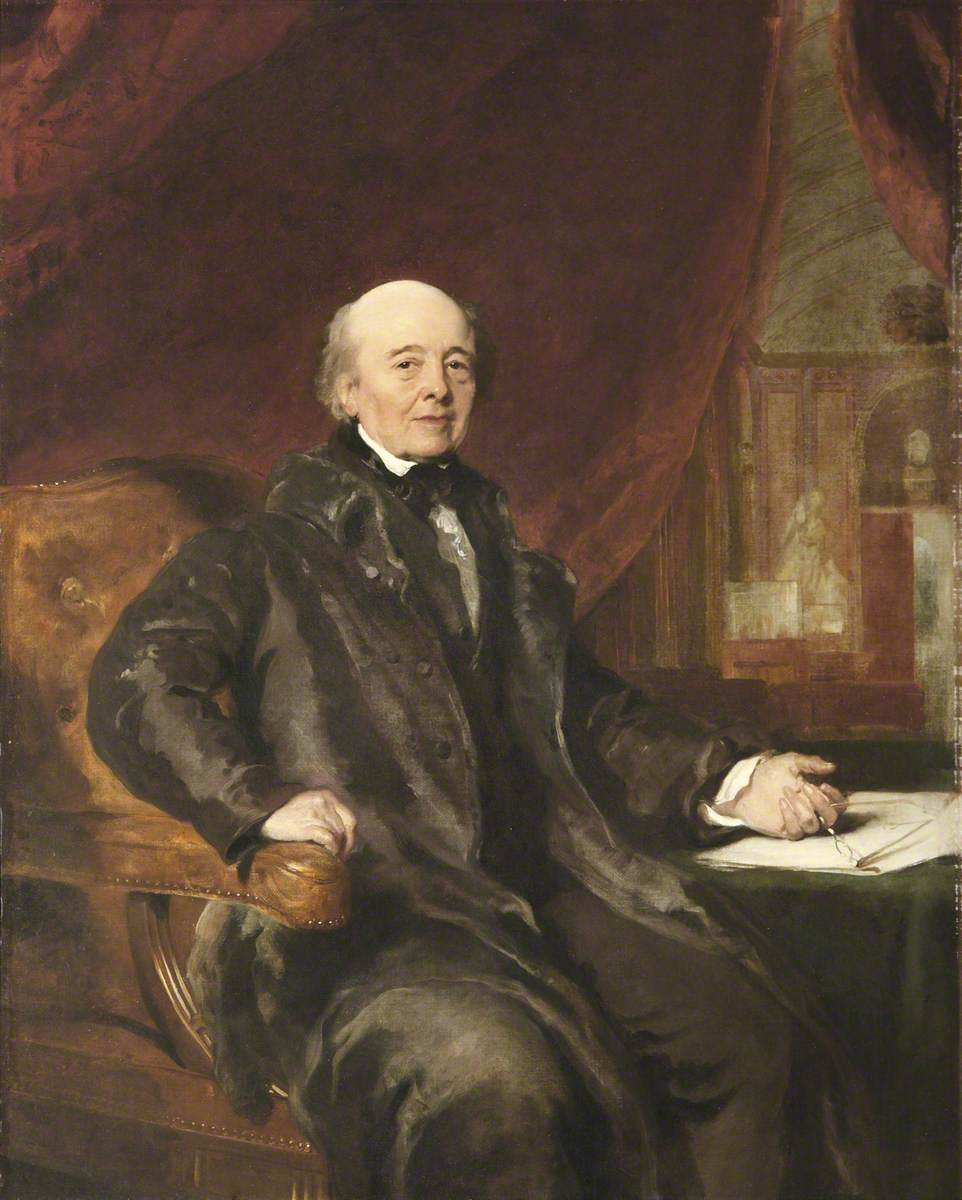
- Portrait by Thomas Lawrence
- Born: 18 January 1752; Lambeth, London, England
- Died: 13 May 1835 (aged 83); East Cowes Castle, Isle of Wight, England
- Occupation: Architect
- Buildings: Marble Arch; Buckingham Palace; Royal Pavilion, Brighton; Regent Street (with James Burton); Carlton House Terrace (with Decimus Burton)

John Nash (18 January 1752 – 13 May 1835) was a British architect of the Georgian and Regency eras. He was responsible for the design, in the neoclassical and picturesque styles, of many important areas of London. His designs were financed by the Prince Regent and by the era's most successful property developer, James Burton. Nash also collaborated extensively with Burton's son, Decimus Burton.

Nash's best-known solo designs are the Royal Pavilion, Brighton; Marble Arch; and Buckingham Palace. His best-known collaboration with James Burton is Regent Street and his best-known collaborations with Decimus Burton are Regent's Park and its terraces and Carlton House Terrace. The majority of his buildings, including those that the Burtons did not contribute to, were built by James Burton's company.

== Background and early career ==
John Nash was born in 1752, probably in Lambeth, south London. (Note: Most historians agree on London as Nash's place of birth, although Howard Colvin caveats it as "probabl[e]" and some sources suggest Cardigan. Both of Nash's parents had strong Welsh connections and John B. Hilling suggests that Nash considered himself to be Welsh.) His father was a millwright also called John (1714–1772). From 1766 or 1767, Nash trained with the architect Sir Robert Taylor. The apprenticeship was completed in 1775 or 1776.

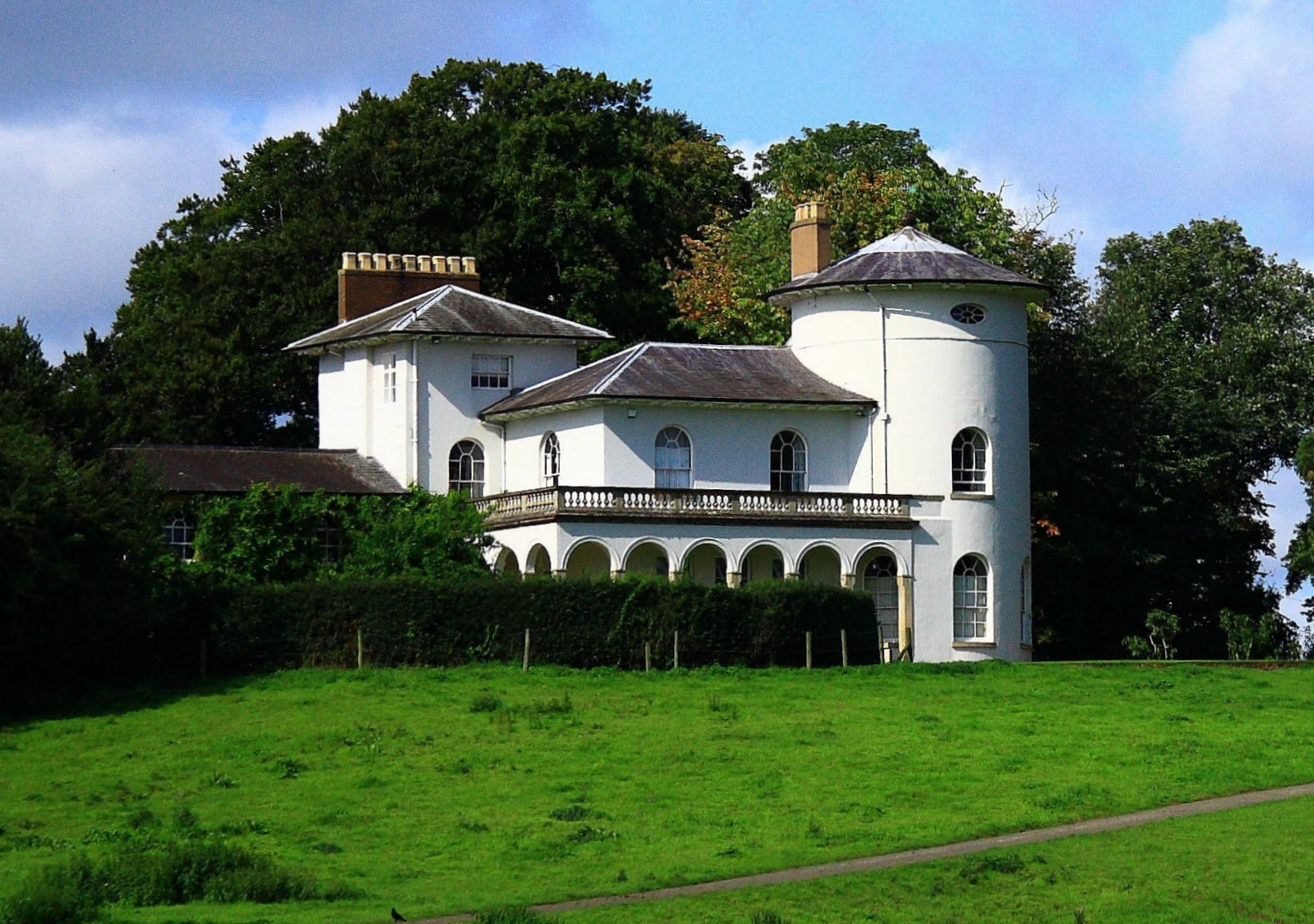
Cronkhill, Shropshire – one of Nash's earlier buildings and the first "Italianate villa in England"

On 28 April 1775, at the now-demolished church of St Mary Newington, Nash married his first wife Jane Elizabeth Kerr, daughter of a surgeon. Initially, he seems to have pursued a career as a surveyor, builder and carpenter. This gave him an income of around £300 a year (~£49,850 in 2020 money). The couple set up home at Royal Row, Lambeth.

He established his own architectural practice in 1777 as well as being in partnership with a timber merchant, Richard Heaviside. The couple had two children, both were baptised at St Mary-at-Lambeth, John on 9 June 1776 and Hugh on 28 April 1778.

In June 1778, Nash, "by the ill conduct of his wife found it necessary to send her into Wales in order to work a reformation on her." The cause of this appears to have been the claim that Jane Nash, "had imposed two spurious children on him as his and her own, notwithstanding she had then never had any child", and she had contracted several debts unknown to her husband, including one for milliners' bills of £300. The claim that Jane had faked her pregnancies and then passed babies she had acquired off as her own was brought before the Consistory court of the Bishop of London. His wife was sent to Aberavon to lodge with Nash's cousin, Ann Morgan, but she developed a relationship with a local man, Charles Charles. In an attempt at reconciliation, Jane returned to London in June 1779, but she continued to act extravagantly so he sent her to another cousin, Thomas Edwards of Neath. She gave birth just after Christmas and acknowledged Charles Charles as the father. In 1781, Nash instigated action against Jane for separation on grounds of adultery. The case was tried at Hereford in 1782. Charles, who was found guilty, was unable to pay the damages of £76 (~£13,200 in 2020 money) and subsequently died in prison. The divorce was finally read 26 January 1787.

His career was initially unsuccessful and short-lived. After inheriting £1000 (~£162,000 in 2020 money) in 1778 from his uncle Thomas, he invested the money in his first independent works, 15–17 Bloomsbury Square and 66–71 Great Russell Street in Bloomsbury. However, the property failed to let and he was declared bankrupt on 30 September 1783. His debts were £5000 (~£760,000 in 2020 money), including £2000 he had been lent by Robert Adam and his brothers. A blue plaque commemorating Nash was placed on 66 Great Russell Street by English Heritage in 2013.

Nash's early career demonstrates his dual capacity as architect and engineer. According to architectural historian John Summerson, Nash was "the last English architect to consider himself not only an architect but an engineer".

== Wales ==
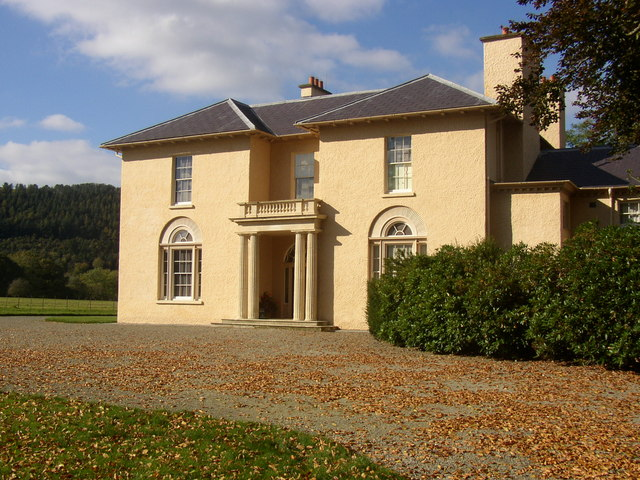
Llanerchaeron

Nash left London in 1784 to live in Carmarthen, Wales, where his mother had retired (her family was from the area). In 1785, he and a local man, Samuel Simon Saxon, re-roofed the town's church for 600 guineas. Nash and Saxon seem to have worked as building contractors and suppliers of building materials. Nash's London buildings had been standard Georgian terraced houses.

In Wales, he matured as an architect. His first major work in the area was the first of three prisons he would design, Carmarthen 1789–92. This was planned by the penal reformer John Howard and Nash developed this into the finished building. He went on to design the prisons at Cardigan (1791–1796) and Hereford (1792–1796). It was at Hereford that Nash met Richard Payne Knight, whose theories on the picturesque as applied to architecture and landscape would influence Nash. The commission for Hereford Gaol came after the death of William Blackburn, who was to have designed the building. Nash's design was accepted after James Wyatt approved of the design.

In 1789, St Davids Cathedral was suffering from structural problems. Its west front was leaning forward by one foot, and Nash was hired to survey the structure and develop a plan to save the building. His solution, completed in 1791, was to demolish the upper part of the façade and rebuild it with two large but inelegant flying buttresses. In 1790, Nash met Uvedale Price, of Downtown Castle, whose theories of the Picturesque would influence Nash's town planning. Price commissioned Nash to design Castle House Aberystwyth (1795). Its plan took the form of a right-angled triangle, with an octagonal tower at each corner, sited on the very edge of the sea.

One of Nash's most important developments were a series of medium-sized country houses that he designed in Wales, which developed the villa designs of his teacher Sir Robert Taylor. Most of these villas consist of a roughly square plan with a small entrance hall and a staircase offset in the middle to one side, around which are placed the main rooms. There is then a less prominent servants' quarters in a wing attached to one side of the villa. The buildings are usually only two floors in height and the elevations of the main block are usually symmetrical. One of the finest of these villas is Llanerchaeron, but at least a dozen villas were designed throughout south Wales. Others, in Pembrokeshire, include Ffynone, built for the Colby family at Boncath, near Manordeifi, and Foley House, built for the lawyer Richard Foley (brother of Admiral Sir Thomas Foley) at Goat Street in Haverfordwest.

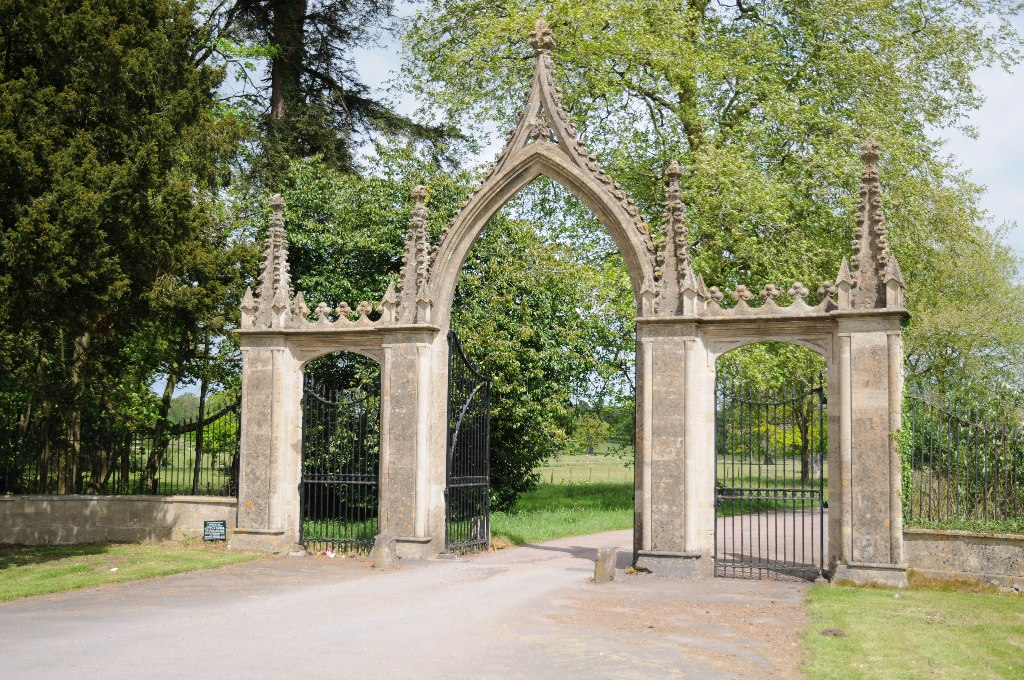
Gates to Clytha Park, Monmouthshire

From 1796, Nash spent most of his time working in London; this was a prelude to his return to the capital in 1797. At this time, Nash designed the delicate Gothic Revival gateway to Clytha Park near Abergavenny in Monmouthshire, and also his alterations in Gothic Revival style in 1794 to Hafod Uchtryd for Thomas Johnes at Devil's Bridge, Cardiganshire. Also in c. 1794–95 he advised on the paving, lighting and water supply in Abergavenny and designed an elegant market building. Other work included Whitson Court, near Newport. After his return to London, Nash continued to design houses in Wales including Harpton Court in Radnorshire, which was demolished, apart from the service wing, in 1956. In 1807 he drew up plans for the re-building of Hawarden Castle with Gothic battlements and towers, but the plan appears to have been modified by another architect when it was carried out. In about 1808, he designed Monachty, near Aberaeron, and later drew up plans for work at Nanteos.

He met Humphry Repton at Stoke Edith in 1792 and formed a successful partnership with the landscape garden designer. One of their early commissions was at Corsham Court in 1795–96. The pair would collaborate to carefully place the Nash-designed building in grounds designed by Repton. The partnership ended in 1800 under recriminations, Repton accusing Nash of exploiting their partnership to his own advantage. As Nash developed his architectural practice, it became necessary to employ draughtsmen; the first in the early 1790s was Augustus Charles Pugin, and later in 1795, John Adey Repton, son of Humphry.

== Return to London ==
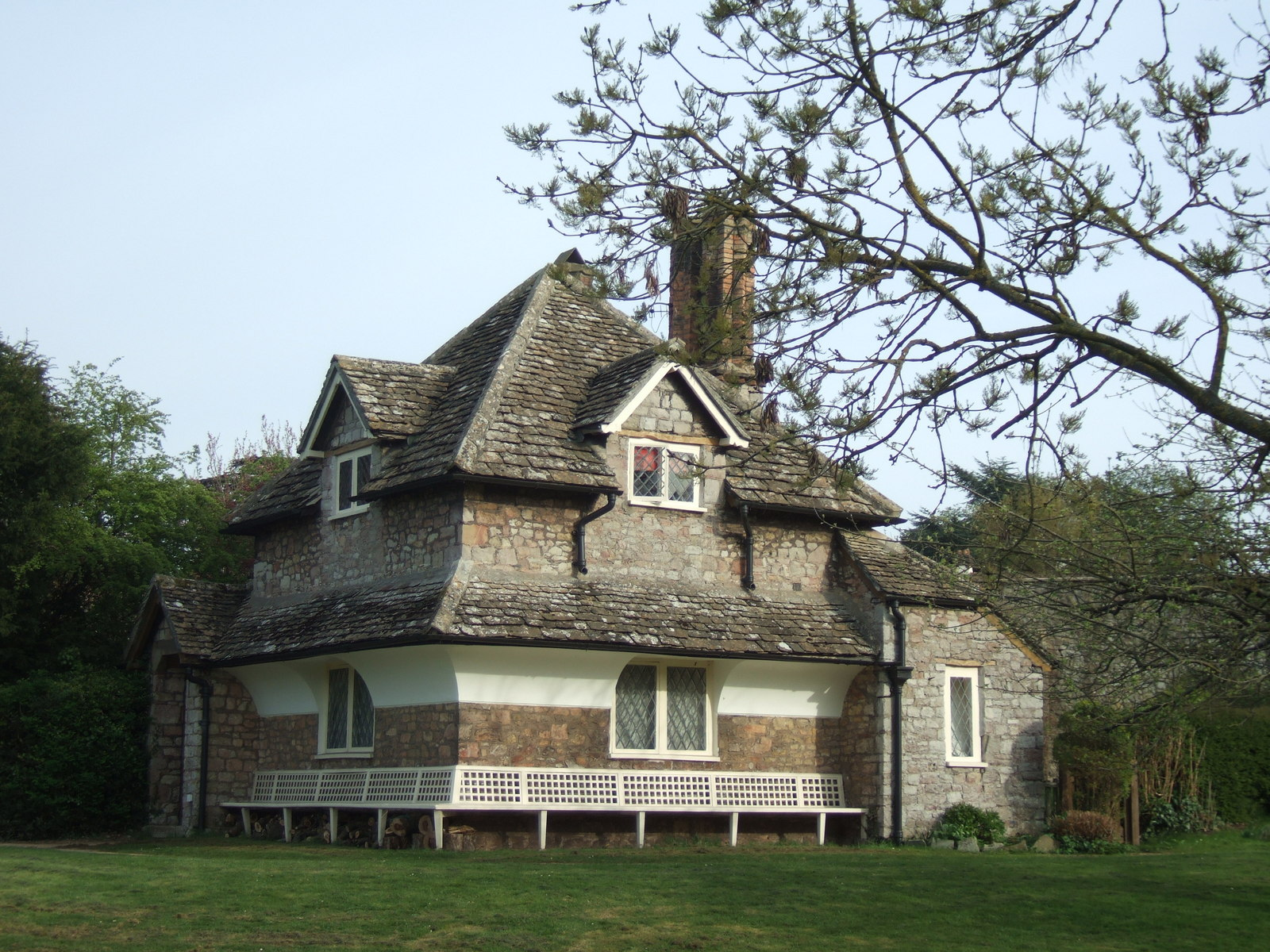
Diamond Cottage, Blaise Hamlet

In June 1797, Nash moved into 28 Dover Street, a building of his own design. He built a larger house next door at 29, into which he moved the following year. Nash married 25-year-old Mary Anne Bradley on 17 December 1798 at St George's, Hanover Square. In 1798, he purchased a plot of land of 30 acres (12 ha) at East Cowes on which he erected 1798–1802 East Cowes Castle as his residence. It was the first of a series of picturesque Gothic castles that he would design.

Nash's final home in London was 14 Regent Street which he designed and built 1819–23. Number 16 was built at the same time for the home of Nash's cousin John Edwards, a lawyer who handled all of Nash's legal affairs. Located in lower Regent Street, near Waterloo Place, both houses formed a single design around an open courtyard. Nash's drawing office was on the ground floor, and on the first floor was the finest room in the house, the 70-foot (21 m) long picture and sculpture gallery; it linked the drawing room at the front of the building with the dining room at the rear. The house was sold in 1834, and the gallery interior moved to East Cowes Castle.

The finest of the dozen country houses that Nash designed as picturesque castles include the relatively small Luscombe Castle Devon (1800–04); Ravensworth Castle (Tyne and Wear), begun in 1807 but only finally completed in 1846, which was one of the largest houses by Nash; Caerhays Castle in Cornwall (1808–10); and Shanbally Castle, County Tipperary (1818–1819), which was the last of these castles to be built. These buildings all represented Nash's continuing development of an asymmetrical and picturesque architectural style that had begun during his years in Wales, at both Castle House Aberystwyth and his alterations to Hafod Uchtryd.

This process would be extended by Nash in planning groups of buildings, the first example being Blaise Hamlet (1810–1811). There a group of nine asymmetrical cottages was laid out around a village green. Nikolaus Pevsner described the hamlet as "the ne plus ultra of the Picturesque movement". The hamlet has also been described as the first fully realized exemplar of the garden suburb. Nash developed the asymmetry of his castles in his Italianate villas. His first such exercise was Cronkhill (1802), and others included Sandridge Park (1805) and Southborough Place, Surbiton (1808).

He advised on work to the buildings of Jesus College, Oxford, in 1815, for which he required no fee but asked that the college commission a portrait of him from Sir Thomas Lawrence to hang in the college hall.

== Architect to the Prince Regent ==
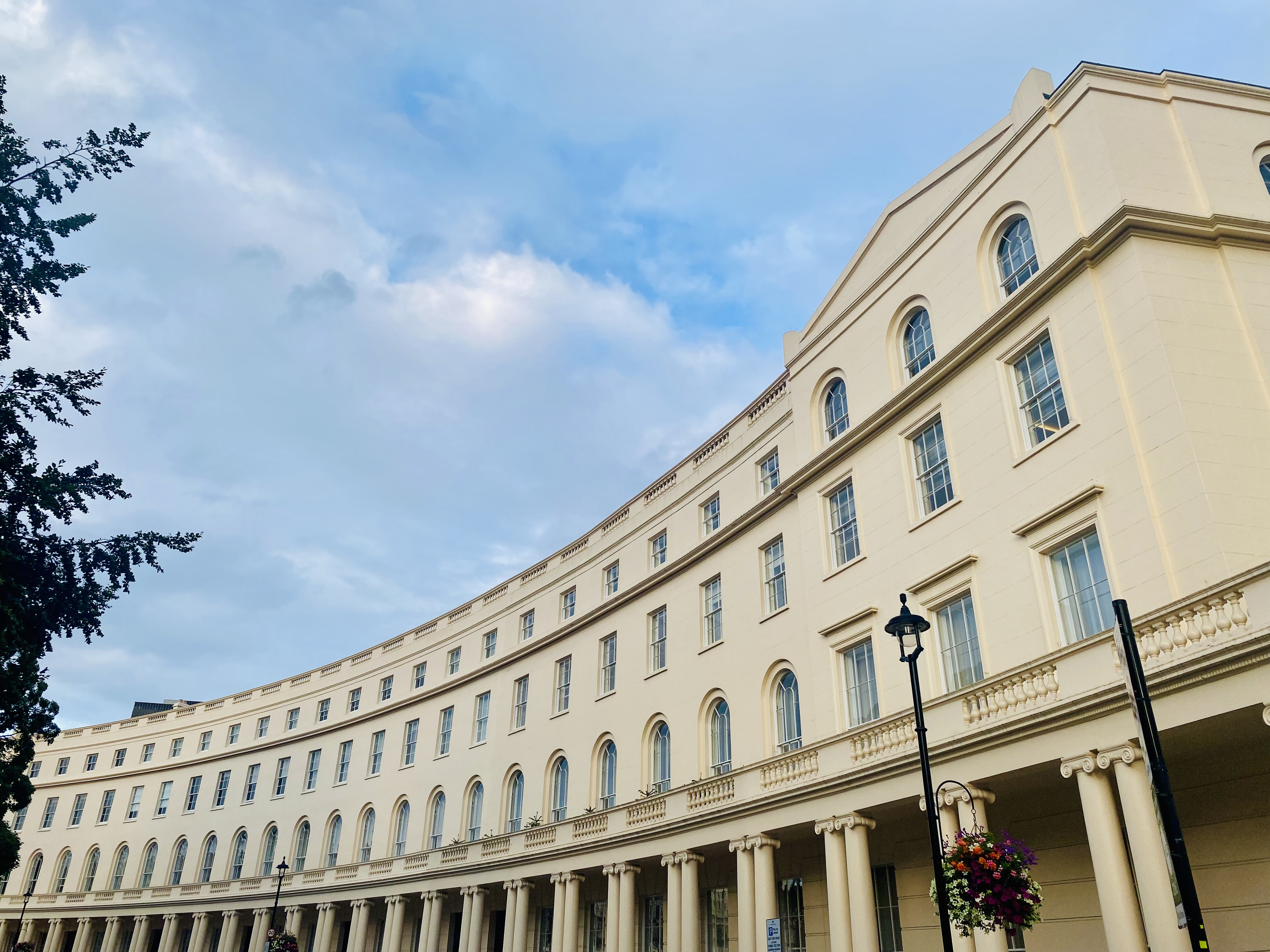
Park Crescent, Regent's Park

Nash was a dedicated Whig and was a friend of Charles James Fox through whom Nash probably came to the attention of the Prince Regent (later King George IV). In 1806 Nash was appointed architect to the Surveyor General of Woods, Forests, Parks, and Chases. From 1810 Nash would take very few private commissions and for the rest of his career he would largely work for the Prince. His employment by the Prince Regent enabled Nash to embark upon a number of grand architectural projects.

His first major commissions in (1809–1826) from the Prince were Regent Street and the development of an area then known as Marylebone Park. With the Regent's backing, Nash created a master plan for the area, put into effect from 1818 onwards, which stretched from St James's northwards and included Regent Street, Regent's Park (1809–1832) and its neighbouring streets, terraces and crescents of elegant townhouses and villas. Nash did not design all the buildings himself. In some instances, these were left in the hands of other architects such as James Pennethorne and the young Decimus Burton.

=== The Rotunda at Carlton House (1814) ===
In 1814, Nash designed and erected a remarkable temporary structure known as the 'Polygon Room' or Rotunda in the gardens of Carlton House for the Prince Regent's Wellington Fête of 21 July. This 116-foot diameter structure employed pioneering structural techniques including:

- Laminated timber construction with specialized iron connectors
- An innovative divided tie-beam truss system, likely the first of its kind in Britain
- A self-supporting catenoidal (tent-shaped) structure spanning without internal columns

The building survived the celebrations and was dismantled in 1818, then re-erected at Woolwich where it served as the Royal Artillery Museum until 2001. The structural innovations developed for the Rotunda directly influenced Nash's subsequent designs for the tent roofs at the Royal Pavilion, Brighton (1817), where similar laminated timber construction was employed.

Nash later proposed converting the Rotunda structure into a church for the Church Building Commission, demonstrating its potential for economical construction at £6,893 compared to the typical £10,000 budget for new churches.

Nash went on to re-landscape St. James's Park (1814–1827), reshaping the formal canal into the present lake, and giving the park its present form. A characteristic of Nash's plan for Regent Street was that it followed an irregular path linking Portland Place to the north with Carlton House, London (replaced by Nash's Carlton House Terrace (1827–1833), to the south. At the northern end of Portland Place Nash designed Park Crescent, London (1812 and 1819–1821), this opens into Nash's Park Square, London (1823–24), this only has terraces on the east and west, the north opens into Regent's Park.

The terraces that Nash designed around Regent's Park though conforming to the earlier form of appearing as a single building, as developed by John Wood, the Elder, are unlike earlier examples set in gardens and are not orthogonal in their placing to each other. This was part of Nash's development of planning, a most extreme example of this was found when he set out Park Village East and Park Village West (1823–34) to the north-east of Regent's Park, here, a mixture of detached villas, semi-detached houses, both symmetrical and asymmetrical in their design are set out in private gardens railed off from the street, the roads loop and the buildings are both classical and gothic in style. No two buildings were the same, and or even in line with their neighbours. The park villages can be seen as the prototype for the Victorian suburbs.

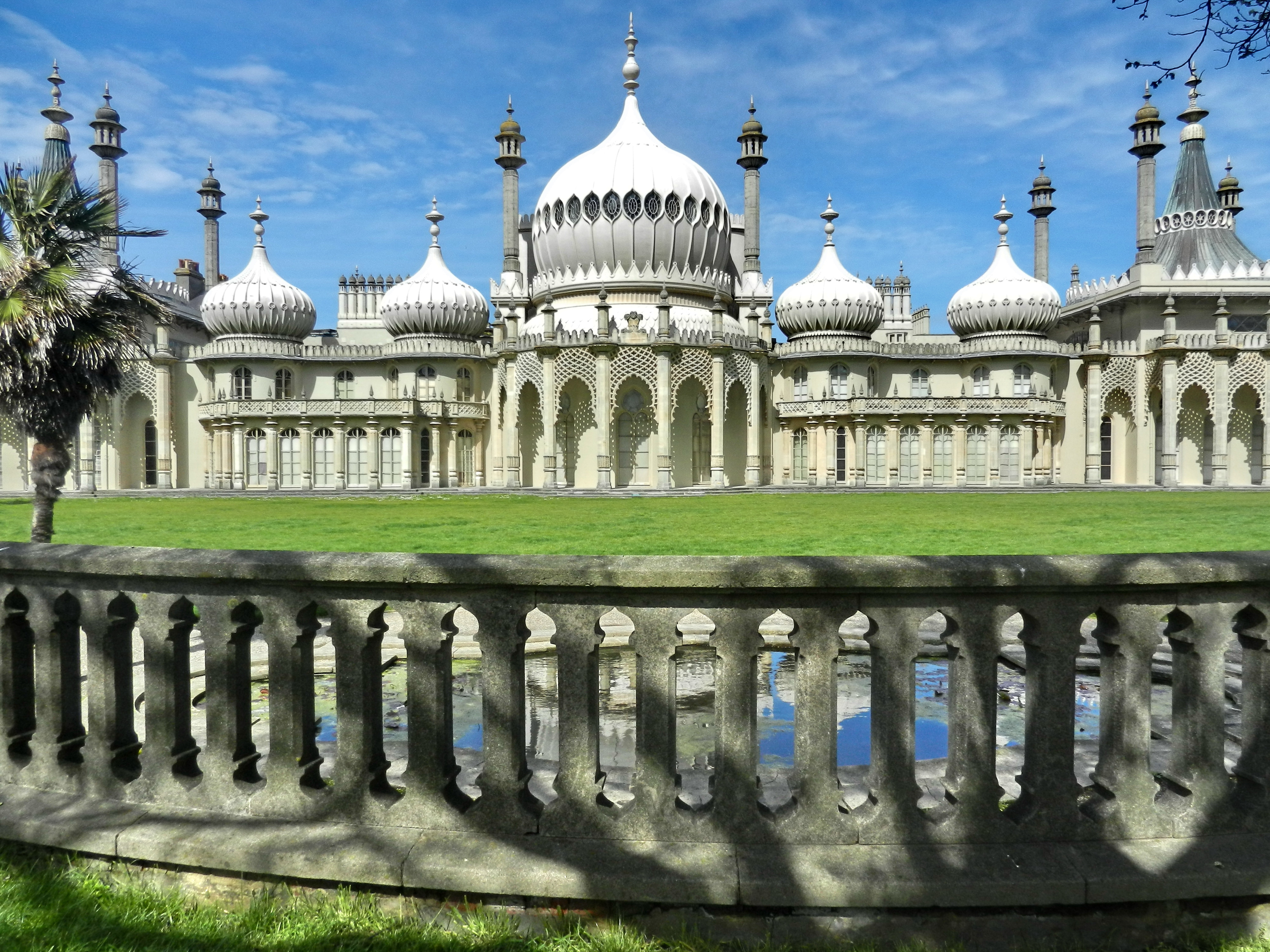
The Royal Pavilion, Brighton

Nash was employed by the Prince from 1815 to develop his Marine Pavilion in Brighton, originally designed by Henry Holland. By 1822 Nash had finished his work on the Marine Pavilion, which was now transformed into the Royal Pavilion. The exterior was based on Mughal architecture, giving the building its exotic form, the Chinoiserie style interiors are largely the work of Frederick Crace.

Nash was also a director of the Regent's Canal Company set up in 1812 to provide a canal link from west London to the River Thames in the east. Nash's master plan provided for the canal to run around the northern edge of Regent's Park; as with other projects, he left its execution to one of his assistants, in this case James Morgan. The first phase of the Regent's Canal was completed in 1816 and finally completed in 1820.

Together with Robert Smirke and Sir John Soane, he became an official architect to the Office of Works in 1813 (although the appointment ended in 1832) at a salary of £500 per annum (£57,810 in 2020 money). Following the death in September of that year of James Wyatt, this marked the high point in his professional life. As part of Nash's new position, he was invited to advise the Parliamentary Commissioners on the building of new churches from 1818 onwards. Nash produced ten church designs, each estimated to cost around £10,000 (£1.2 million in 2020 money) with seating capacity for 2000 people; the style of the buildings were both classical and gothic. In the end, Nash only built two churches for the Commission: the classical All Souls Church, Langham Place (1822–24), terminating the northern end of Regent Street, and the gothic St. Mary's Haggerston (1825–27), bombed during The Blitz in 1941.

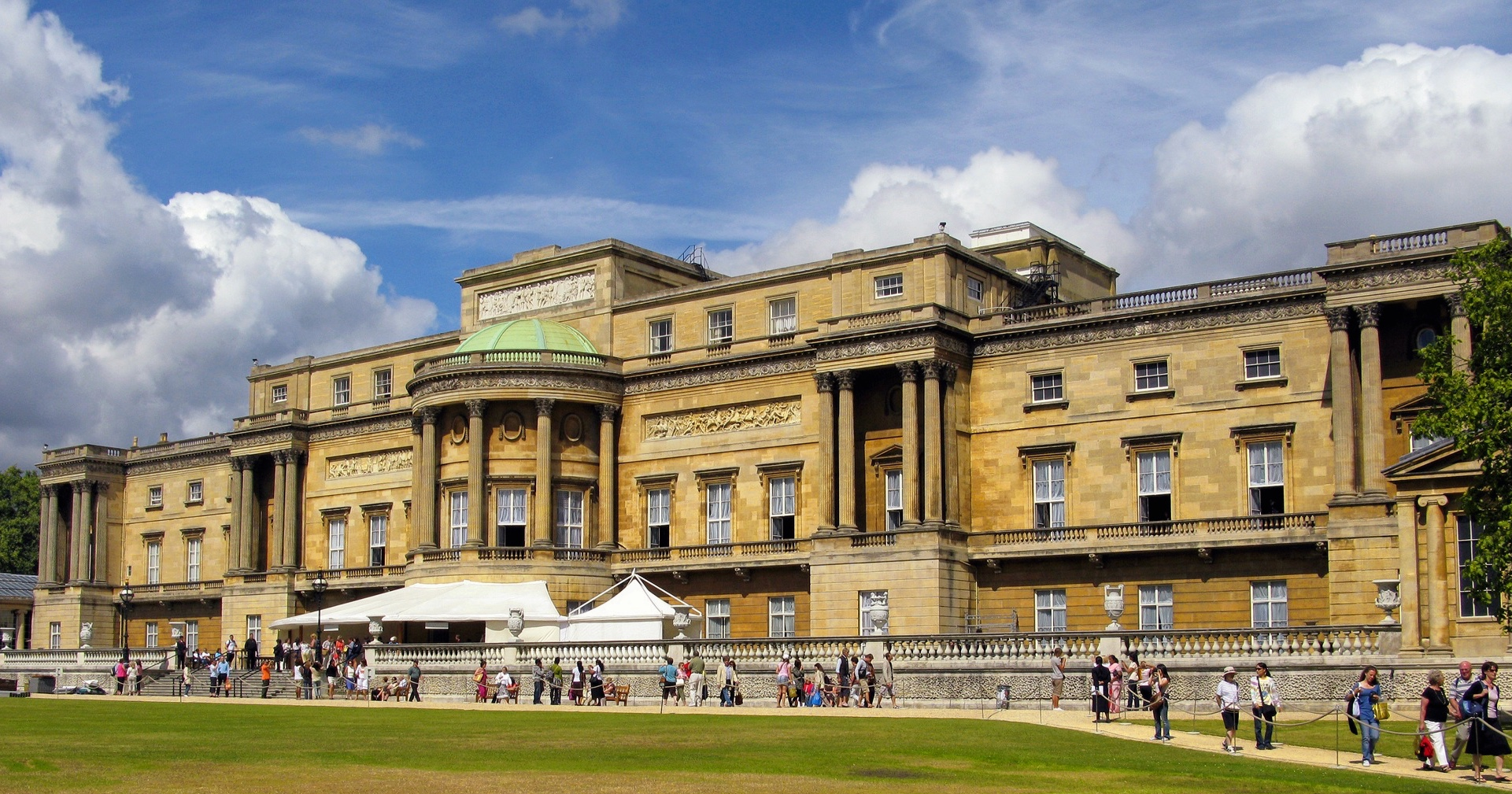
West front of Buckingham Palace

Nash was involved in the design of two of London's theatres, both in Haymarket. The King's Opera House (now rebuilt as Her Majesty's Theatre) (1816–1818) where he and George Repton remodelled the theatre, with arcades and shops around three sides of the building, the fourth being the still surviving Royal Opera Arcade. The other theatre was the Theatre Royal Haymarket (1821), with its fine hexastyle Corinthian order portico, which still survives, facing down Charles II Street to St. James's Square, Nash's interior no longer survives (the interior now dates from 1904).

In 1820 a scandal broke, when a cartoon was published showing a half-dressed King George IV embracing Nash's wife with a speech bubble coming from the King's mouth containing the words "I have great pleasure in visiting this part of my dominions". Whether this was based on just a rumour put about by people who resented Nash's success or if there is substance behind is not known. Further London commissions for Nash followed, including the remodelling of Buckingham House to create Buckingham Palace (1825–1830), and for the Royal Mews (1822–24) and Marble Arch (1828). The arch was originally designed as a triumphal arch to stand at the entrance to Buckingham Palace. It was moved when the east wing of the palace designed by Edward Blore was built, at the request of Queen Victoria whose growing family required additional domestic space. Marble Arch became the entrance to Hyde Park and the Great Exhibition.

== Work with James and Decimus Burton ==
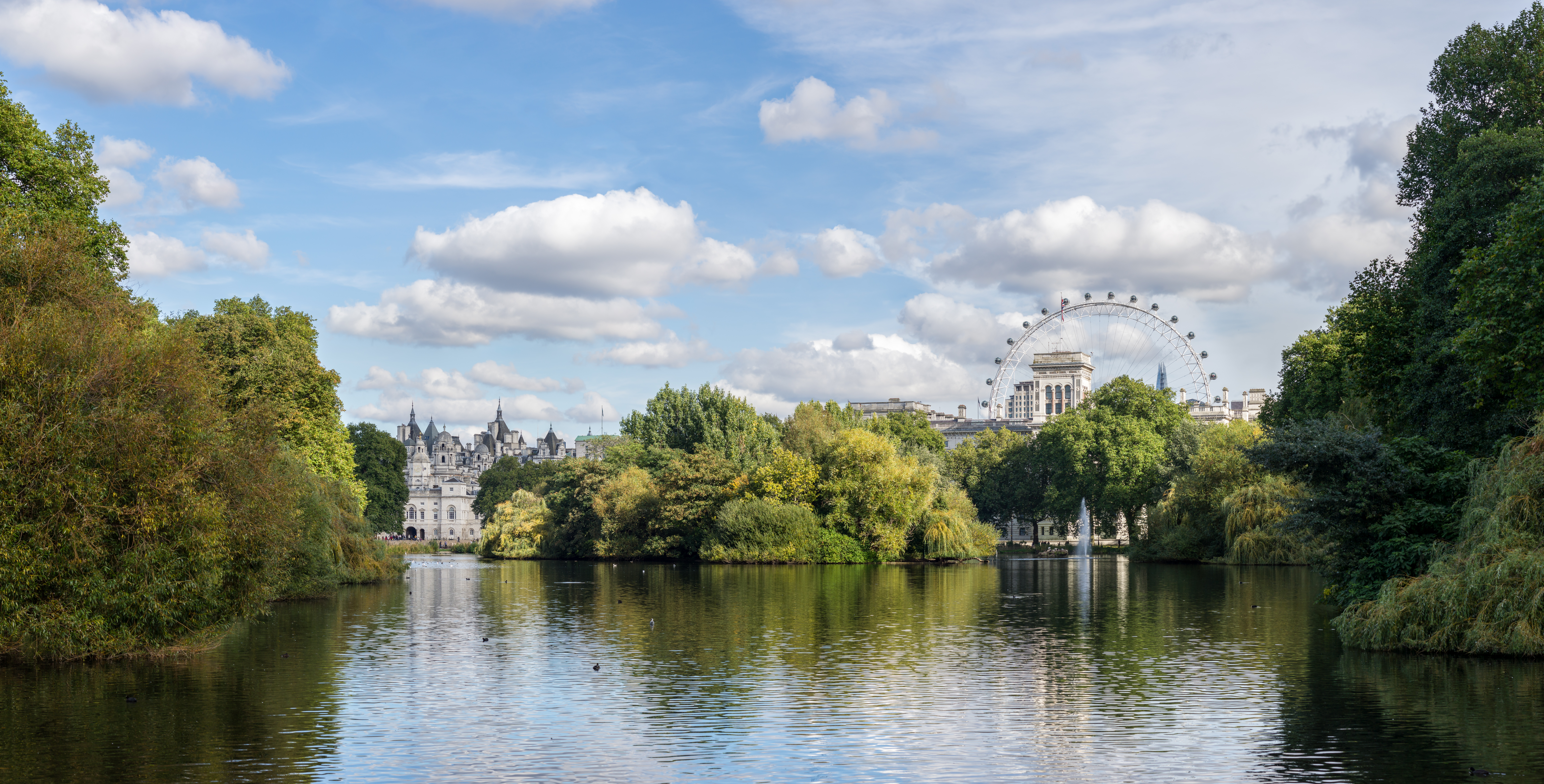
Lake in St James's Park

The parents of John Nash, and Nash himself during his childhood, lived in Southwark, where James Burton worked as an "Architect and Builder" and developed a positive reputation for prescient speculative building between 1785 and 1792. Burton built the Blackfriars Rotunda in Great Surrey Street (now Blackfriars Road) to house the Leverian Museum, for land agent and museum proprietor James Parkinson. However, whereas Burton was vigorously industrious, and quickly became "most gratifyingly rich", Nash's early years in private practice, and his first speculative developments, which failed either to sell or let, were unsuccessful, and his consequent financial shortage was exacerbated by the "crazily extravagant" wife whom he had married before he had completed his training, until he was declared bankrupt in 1783.

To repair his finances, Nash cultivated the acquaintance of James Burton, who consented to patronize him. James Burton responsible for the social and financial patronage of the majority of Nash's London designs, in addition to for their construction. Architectural scholar Guy Williams has written, "John Nash relied on James Burton for moral and financial support in his great enterprises. Decimus had showed precocious talent as a draughtsman and as an exponent of the classical style... John Nash needed the son's aid, as well as the father's".

Subsequent to the Crown Estate's refusal to finance them, James Burton agreed to personally finance the construction projects of Nash at Regent's Park, which he had already been commissioned to construct. Consequently, in 1816, Burton purchased many of the leases of the proposed terraces around, and proposed villas within, Regent's Park and, in 1817, Burton purchased the leases of five of the largest blocks on Regent Street. The first property to be constructed in or around Regent's Park by Burton was his own mansion: The Holme, which was designed by his son, Decimus Burton, and completed in 1818. Burton's extensive financial involvement "effectively guaranteed the success of the project". In return, Nash agreed to promote the career of Decimus Burton.

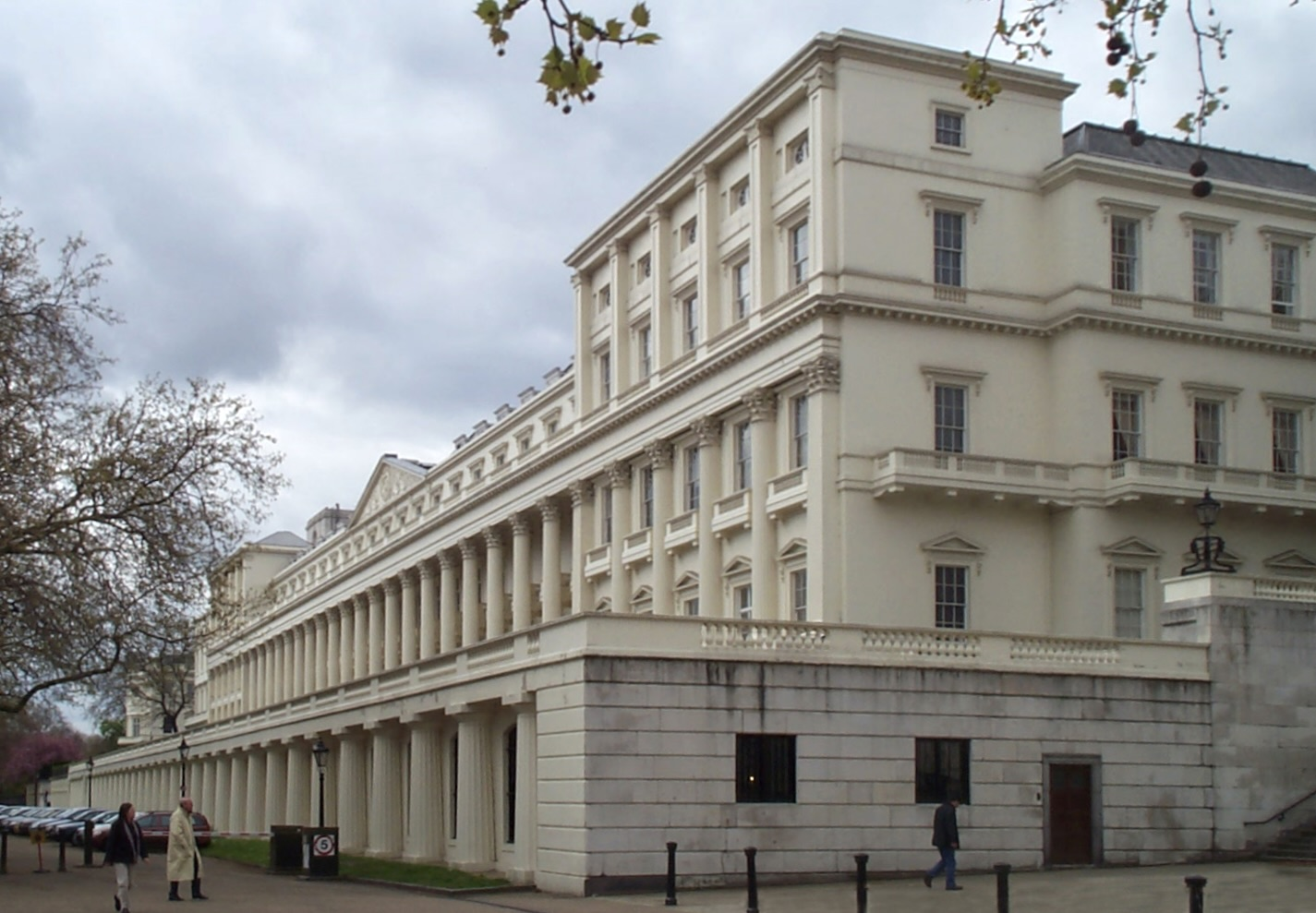
Carlton House Terrace

Nash was a vehement advocate of the neoclassical revival endorsed by John Soane, although he had lost interest in the plain stone edifices typical of the Georgian style, and instead advocated the use of stucco. Decimus Burton entered the office of Nash in 1815, where he worked alongside Augustus Charles Pugin, who detested the neoclassical style. Burton established his own architectural practice in 1821. In 1821, Nash invited Decimus Burton to design Cornwall Terrace in Regent's Park, and he was also invited by George Bellas Greenough, a close friend of the Prince Regent, Humphry Davy, and Nash, to design Grove House in Regent's Park.

Greenough's invitation to Decimus Burton was "virtually a family affair", for Greenough had dined frequently with Decimus's parents and brothers, including the physician Henry Burton. Greenough and Decimus finalized their designs during numerous meetings at the opera. The design, when the villa had been completed, was described in The Proceedings of the Royal Society as, "one of the most elegant and successful adaptations of the Grecian style to purposes of modern domestic architecture to be found in this or any country."

Subsequently, Nash invited Decimus to design Clarence Terrace, Regent's Park. Such were Decimus Burton's contributions to the Regent's Park project that the Commissioners of Woods described Burton, not Nash, as "the architect of Regent's Park". Contrary to popular belief, the dominant architectural influence in many of the Regent's Park projects – including Cornwall Terrace, York Terrace, Chester Terrace, Clarence Terrace, and the villas of the Inner Circle, including The Holme and the London Colosseum attraction (the latter to Thomas Hornor's specifications) all of which were constructed by James Burton's company – was Decimus Burton, not John Nash, who was appointed architectural "overseer" for Burton Jr.'s projects.

Decimus Burton, to Nash's chagrin, developed the Terraces according to his own style to the extent that Nash sought, unsuccessfully, to demolish and completely rebuild Chester Terrace. Decimus subsequently eclipsed his master and emerged as the dominant force in the design of Carlton House Terrace, where he exclusively designed No. 3 and No. 4. He also designed some of the villas of the Inner Circle: his villa for the Marquess of Hertford has been described as, "decorated simplicity, such as the hand of taste, aided by the purse of wealth can alone execute".

== Retirement and death ==
Nash's career effectively ended with the death of George IV in 1830. The King's notorious extravagance had generated much resentment, and Nash was now without a protector. The Treasury started to look closely at the cost of Buckingham Palace. Nash's original estimate of the building's cost had been £252,690, but this had risen to £496,169 in 1829; the actual cost was £613,269 (~£69.5 million in 2020 money), and the building was still unfinished. This controversy ensured that Nash would not receive any more official commissions, nor would he be awarded the knighthood that other contemporary architects such as Jeffry Wyattville, John Soane and Robert Smirke received. Nash retired to the Isle of Wight to his home, East Cowes Castle.

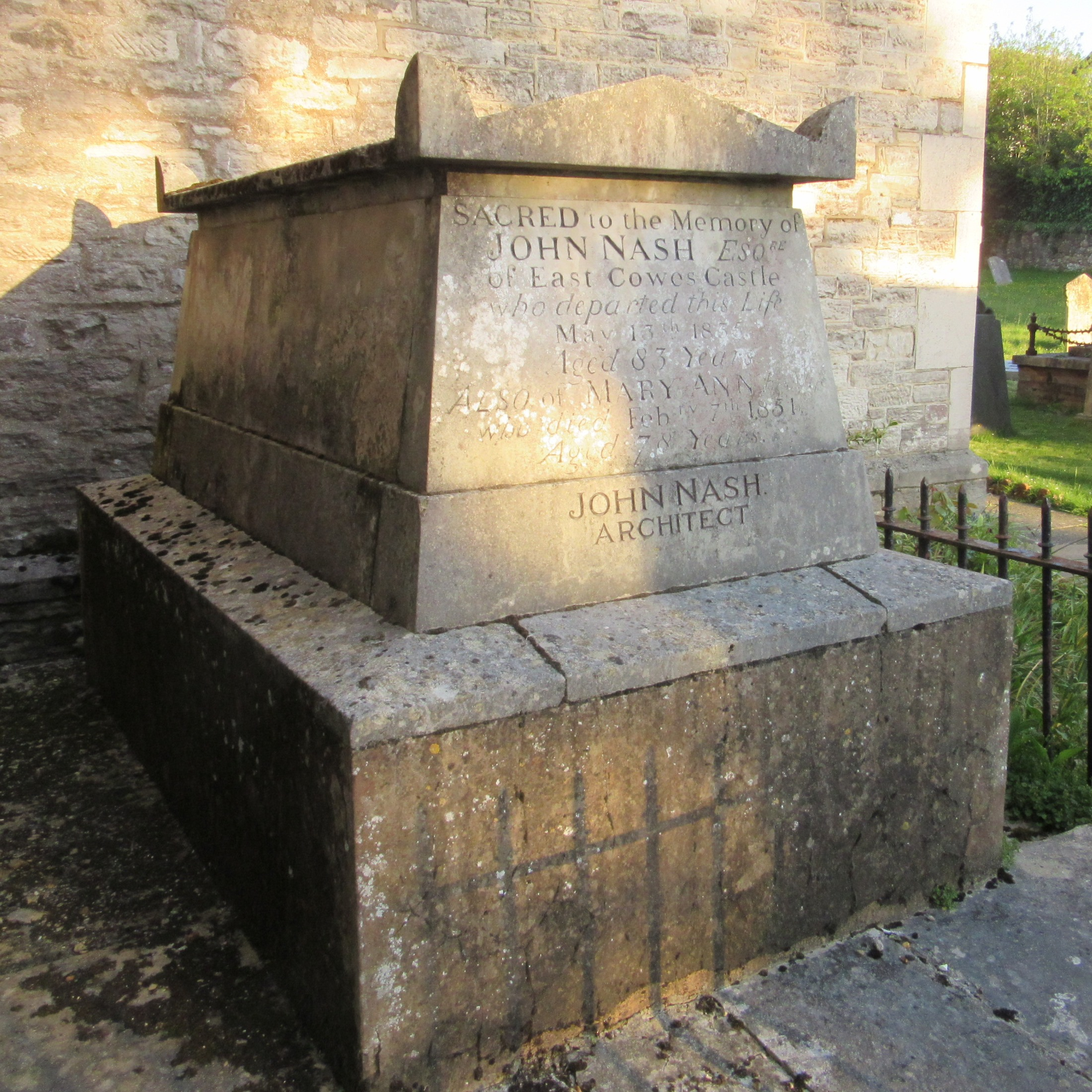
Nash's tomb at St James's Church, East Cowes

On 28 March 1835 Nash was described as "very poorly and faint". This was the beginning of the end. On 1 May Nash's solicitor John Wittet Lyon was summonsed to East Cowes Castle to finalise his will. By 6 May he was described as "very ill indeed all day", he died at his home on 13 May 1835. His funeral took place at St. James's Church, East Cowes on 20 May, where he was buried in the churchyard with a monument in the form of a stone sarcophagus. His widow acted to clear Nash's debts (some £15,000; £1.97 million in 2020 money), she held a sale of the Castle's contents, including three paintings by J. M. W. Turner painted on the Isle of Wight, four by Benjamin West and several copies of old master paintings by Richard Evans. These artworks were sold at Christie's on 11 July 1835 for £1,061 (~£139,500 in 2020 money). His books, medals, drawings and engravings were bought by a bookseller named Evans for £1,423 on 15 July (~£187,078 in 2020 money). The Castle itself was sold for a reported figure of £20,000 (~£2.63 million in 2020 money) to Henry Boyle, 3rd Earl of Shannon, within the year. Nash's widow retired to a property Nash had bequeathed to her in Hampstead where she lived until her death in 1851; she was buried with her husband on the Isle of Wight.

== Assistants and pupils ==
Nash had many pupils and assistants, including Decimus Burton; Humphry Repton's sons, John Adey Repton and George Stanley Repton; Anthony Salvin; John Foulon (1772–1842); Augustus Charles Pugin; F.H. Greenway; James Morgan; James Pennethorne; and the brothers Henry, James, and George Pain. A particularly important collaborator was William Nixon (d. 1826), whom Nash described as "the most diligent attentive and the most honest Clerk of the Works that I have ever met with". Nixon served as superintendent of works at Carlton House from 1811, and may have been responsible for resolving the structural details of the Rotunda's innovative roof. According to T. F. Hunt, writing in 1830, the Rotunda's roof "was designed or invented by, and executed under the direction of, the late William Nixon". Nixon later supervised Nash's works at Brighton Pavilion and served as superintending Clerk of the Works at Buckingham Palace until his death in 1826.

== Works ==
=== Works in London ===
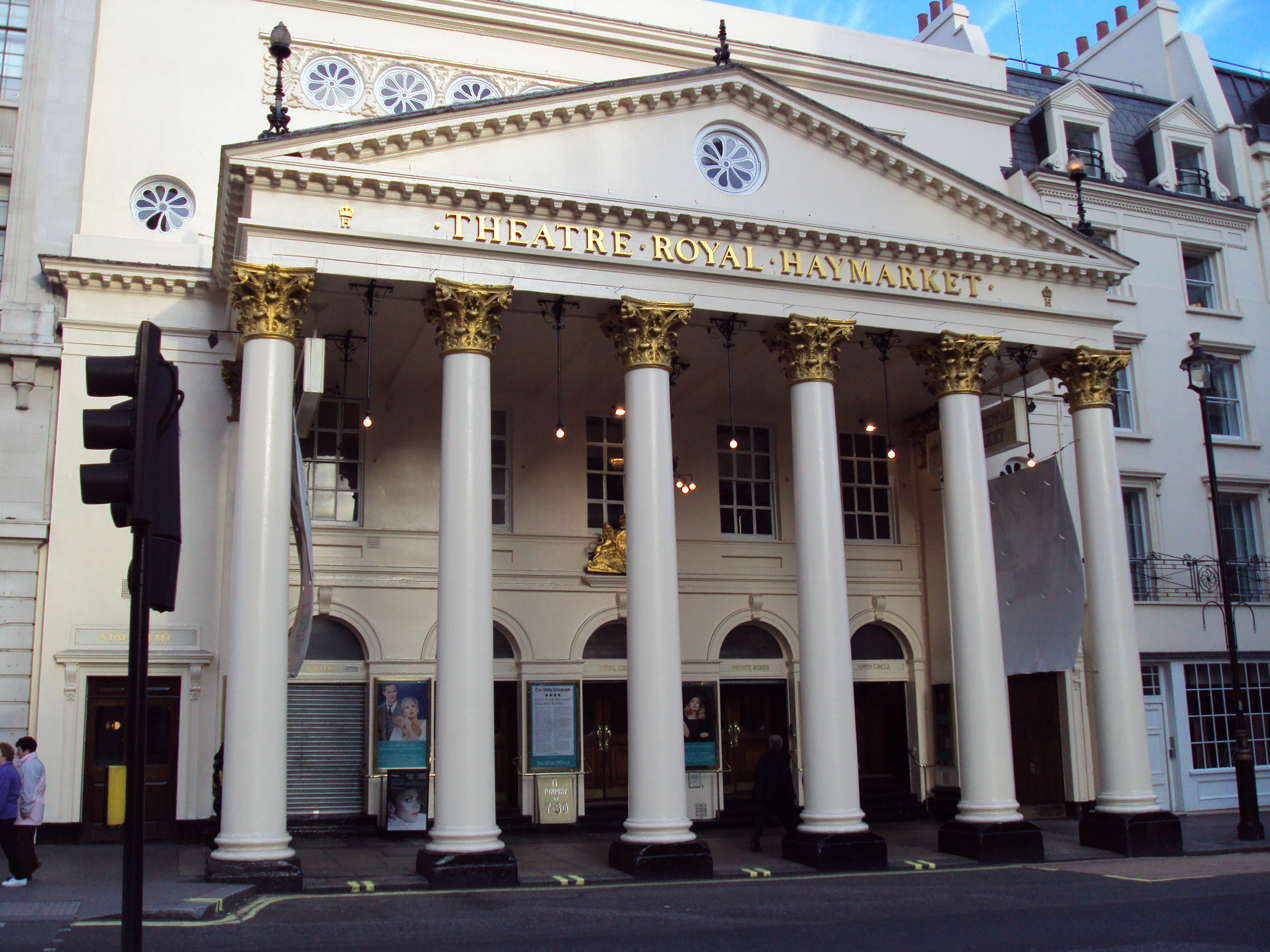
Haymarket Theatre

Works in London include: (Note: The lists of works are based on: John Nash: A complete catalogue by, Michael Mansbridge)

- Park Crescent, London (1806, 1819–21)
- Carlton House, alterations, demolished
- Southborough House, 14 Ashcombe Avenue, Southborough, Surbiton (1808)
- Southborough Lodge, 16 Ashcombe Avenue, Southborough, Surbiton (1808)
- 18 Ashcombe Avenue, Southborough, Surbiton (1808) Southborough House's summer house
- Regent Street (1809–26) rebuilt
- Regent's Canal (1811–20)
- Royal Lodge (1811–20) subsequently remodelled by Sir Jeffry Wyattville
- Carlton House, London remodelled several interiors, (1812–14) demolished 1825 to make way for Nash's Carlton House Terraces
- Trafalgar Square (1813–30) completely redesigned by Sir Charles Barry
- The Rotunda, Woolwich (1814; re-erected 1820)

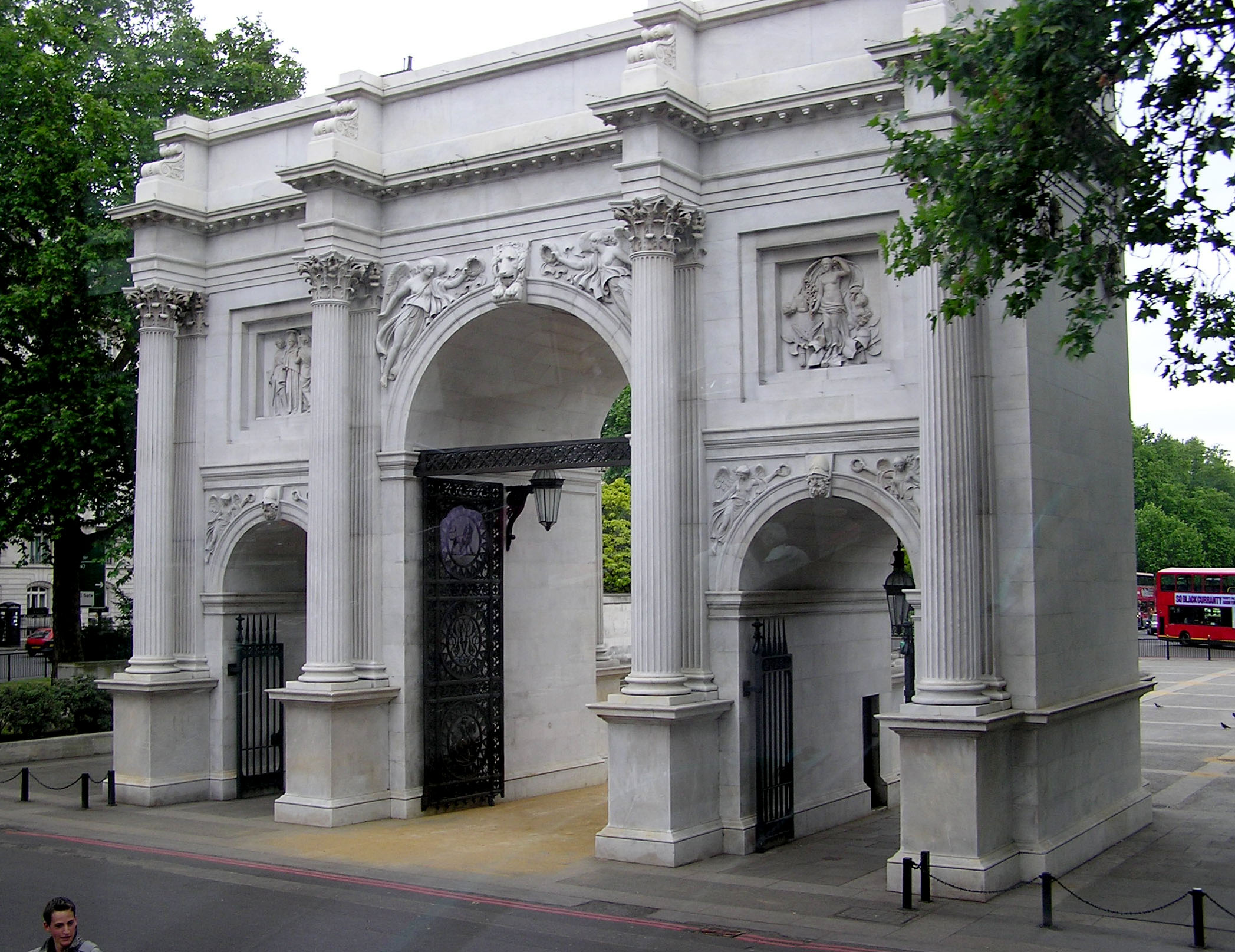
Marble Arch

- The King's Opera House, Haymarket, on the site of Her Majesty's Theatre. The Royal Opera Arcade is the only part presently standing (1816–18).
- Waterloo Place (1816) rebuilt
- The County Fire Office (1819) rebuilt
- Piccadilly Circus (1820) rebuilt
- Suffolk Place, Haymarket (1820)
- Haymarket Theatre (1820–21)
- 14–16 Regent Street (Nash's own house) (1820–21)
- York Gate (1821)
- The Church of All Souls, Langham Place (1822–25)
- Hanover Terrace (1822)
- Royal Mews (1822–24)

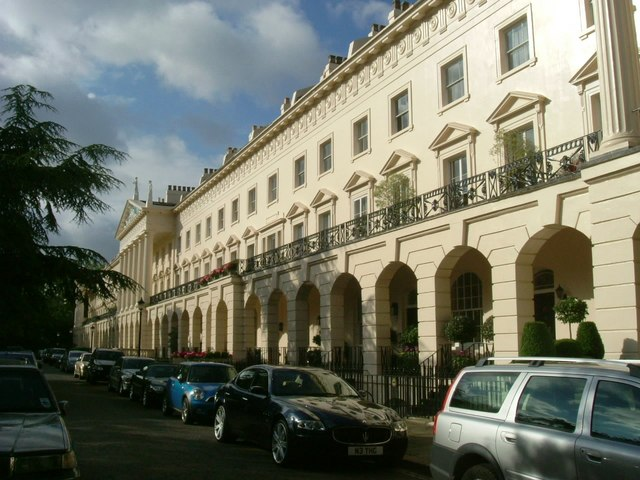
Hanover Terrace

- Sussex Place (1822–23)
- Albany Terrace, London (1823)
- Park Square, London (1823–24)
- Park Village East and West (1823–34)
- Cambridge Terrace (1824)
- Landscaping of King's Road (1824)
- Ulster Terrace (1824)
- Buckingham Palace. The state rooms and western front (1825–30), since much extended by James Pennethorne, Edward Blore, and Aston Webb
- Clarence House (1825–27)
- Cumberland Terrace (1826)
- Former United Services Club Pall Mall now Institute of Directors (1826–28)

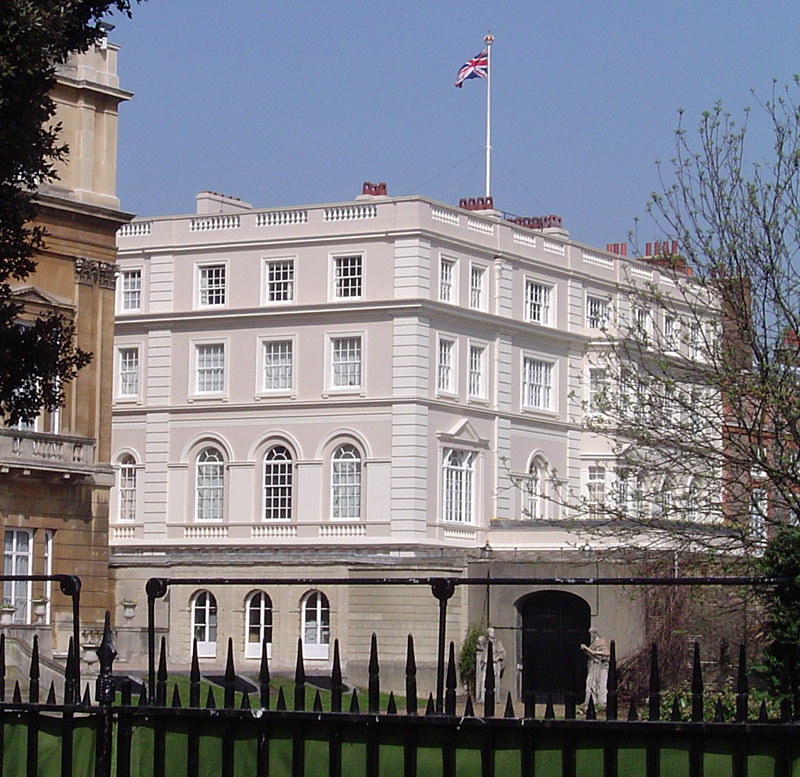
Clarence House

- Gloucester Terrace (1827)
- Marble Arch (1828)
- 430–449 Strand (1830)

==== With Decimus Burton ====
- Regent's Park (1809–32)
- York Terrace (1822)
- Chester Terrace (1825)
- Cornwall Terrace
- Clarence Terrace
- Carlton House Terrace (1827–33)
- St. James's Park (1814–27)

The changes made by John Nash to the streetscape of London are documented in the film John Nash and London, featuring Edmund N. Bacon and based on sections of his 1967 book Design of Cities.

=== Work in England outside London ===
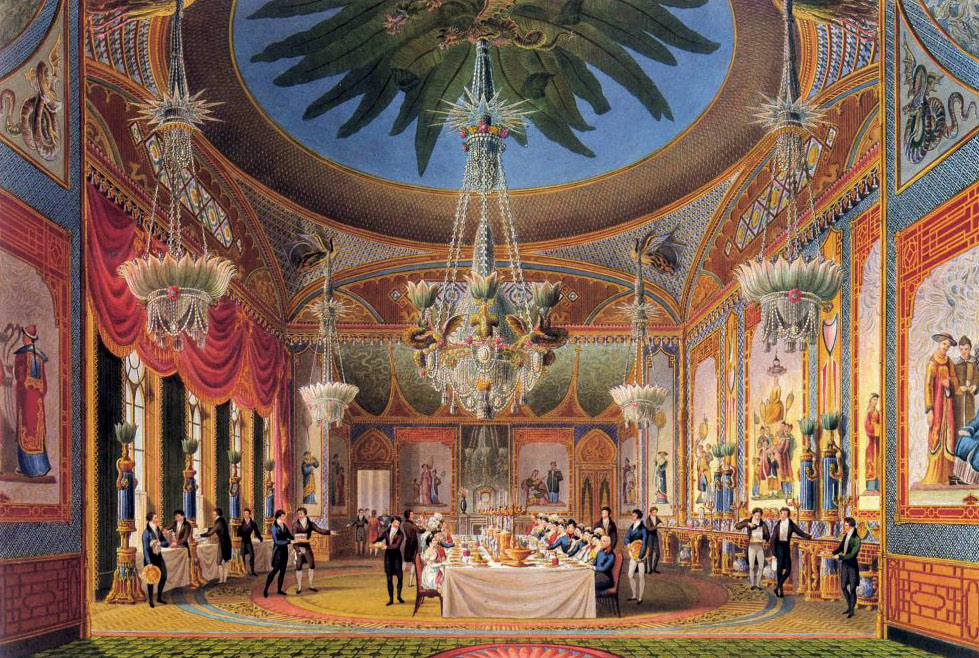
Banqueting Room, The Royal Pavilion Brighton

- Blaise Castle, additions, including the conservatory and various buildings in the grounds, dairy, gatehouses etc. (1795–c.1806)
- Kentchurch Court, Pontrilas (c.1795)
- Hereford Gaol (1796)
- Hereford Lunatic Asylum (c. 1796), no longer standing
- Corsham Court, remodelling work (1796–1813). Only his east front survives of the main house, but many of his garden buildings, including the bathhouse originally designed by Capability Brown and remodelled by Nash, are extant.
- Grovelands Park, Enfield, Middlesex (1797)
- Atcham, several houses in the village (1797)
- Attingham Park, new picture gallery and staircase, with further interiors, and entrance lodges (c.1797–1808)

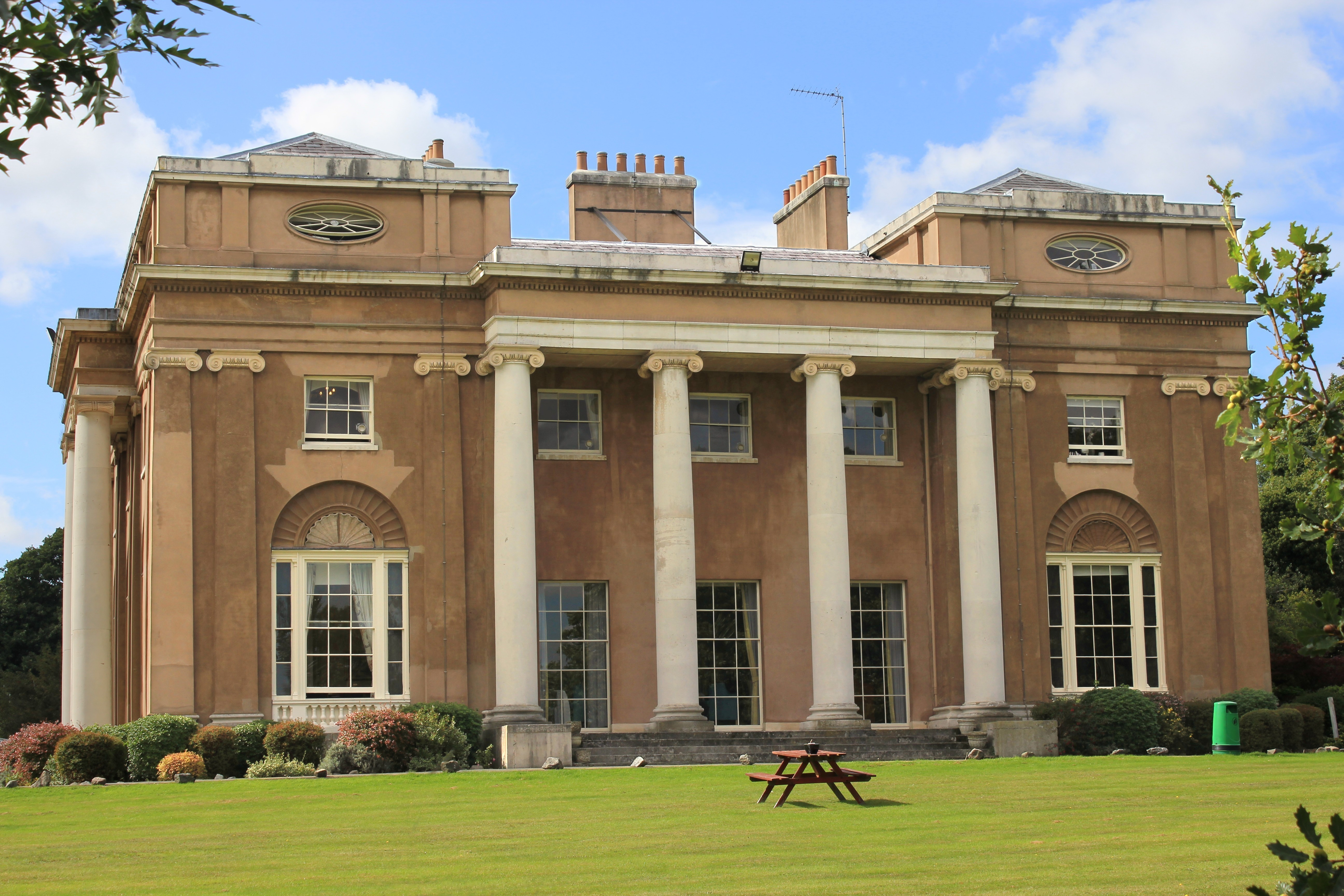
Grovelands Park

- East Cowes Castle on the Isle of Wight (1798–1802) – his home until his death in 1835, demolished 1960
- Sundridge Park, Sundridge, London, (1799)
- Chalfont Park, Chalfont St Peter, remodelled (1799–1800)
- Helmingham Hall, modernisation work (1800–03)
- Luscombe Castle (1800–04)
- Cronkhill, near Shrewsbury, Shropshire. The first Italianate villa in Britain (1802)
- Longner Hall, Atcham, remodelling and extension (1803)
- Nunwell House, Nunwell Isle of Wight (1805–07)

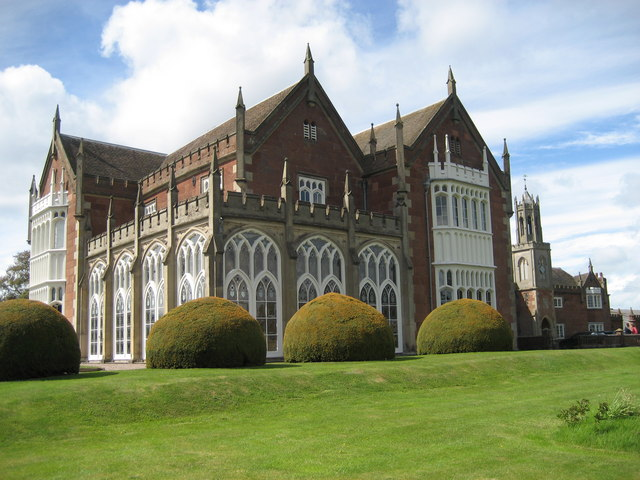
Longner Hall

- Sandridge Park (1805)
- Witley Court (1805–06)
- Market House Chichester (1807)
- Ravensworth Castle (1808)
- Caerhays Castle, Cornwall (1808)
- Ingestre Hall (1808–13) rebuilt later in the 19th century
- Knepp Castle, Sussex, c.1809
- Blaise Hamlet, Bristol (1810–11)
- Newport Guildhall, Isle of Wight (1814)
- Rebuilding of the Royal Pavilion at Brighton (1815–22) – the tented roofs over the Music and Banqueting Rooms were direct descendants of Nash's Rotunda at Carlton House, employing similar laminated timber construction

=== Work in Wales ===
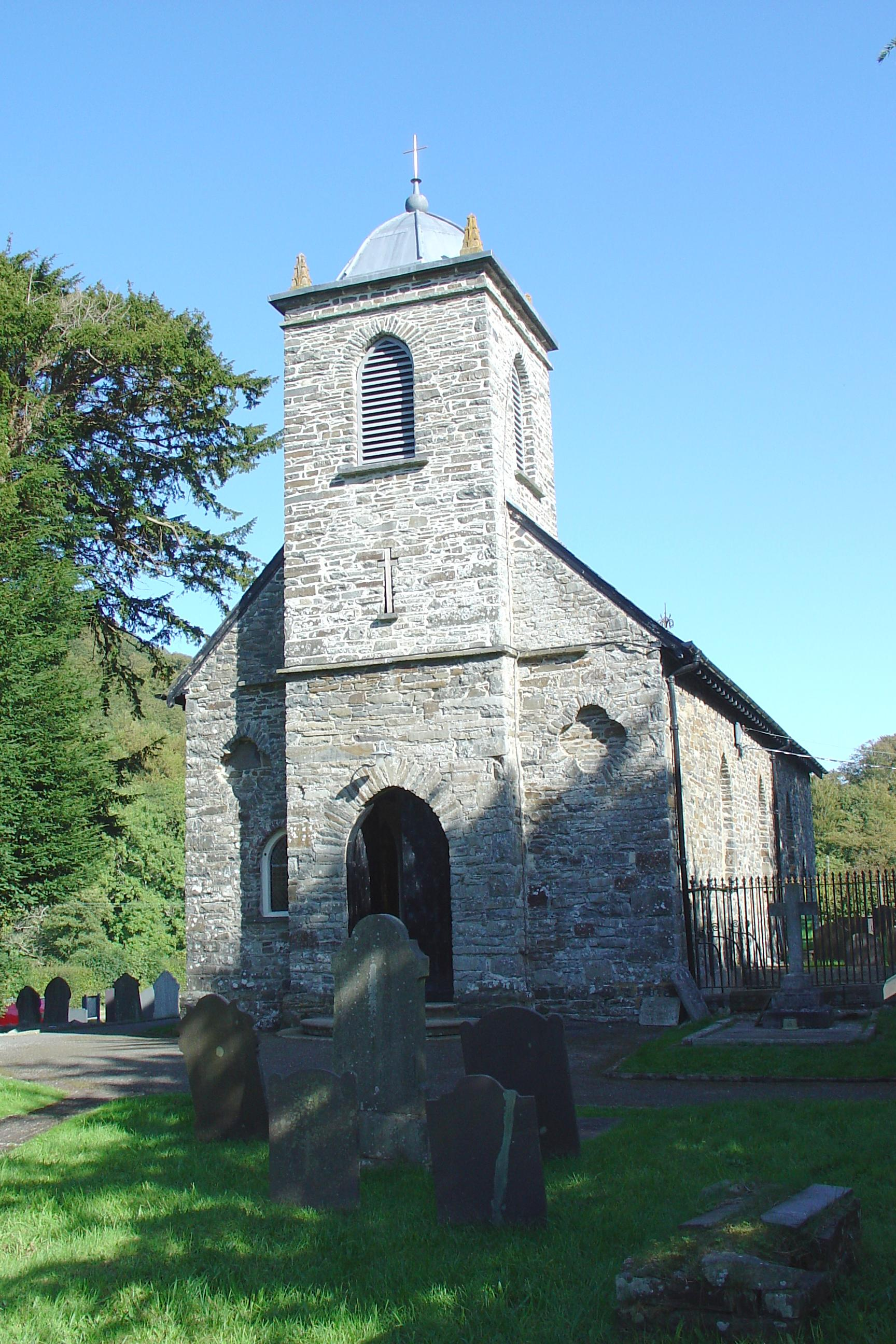
St. Non's Church Llanerchaeron

Work in Wales include:

- The stable block at Plas Llanstephan (1788)
- Golden Grove, Llanfihangel Aberbythych (1788)
- Priory House, Carmarthen (1788–89)
- Carmarthen Gaol, (1789–92)
- St Davids Cathedral, new west front (1789–91) completely remodelled by Sir George Gilbert Scott (1862)
- Glanusk Villa, Cadoxton-juxta-Neath (1790)
- Llanfechan house, Llanwenog, Cardiganshire c. 1790 attributed on stylistic grounds
- Meidrim Poor House (1791)
- Newport Bridge (1791–92) abandoned before completion
- Cardigan Gaol (1791–97)
- Ffynone, Boncath (1792–96)
- Sion House, Tenby (1792)
- South Sion Lodge, Tenby (1792)
- Emlyn Cottage, Newcastle Emlyn (1792–94) demolished 1881
- Dolaucothi House, Cynwyl Gaeo (1792–96) demolished (c. 1954)

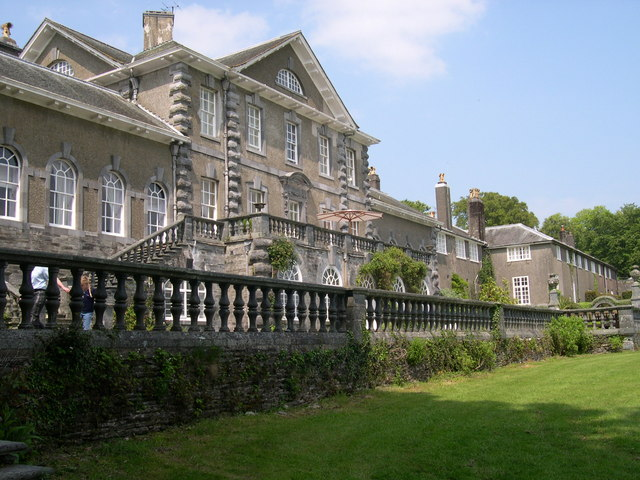
Ffynone House, wings added later not by Nash

- Tregaron Bridge (1793)
- Abergavenny Market Place (1794–46)
- Foley House, Haverfordwest, Pembrokeshire (1794)
- Hafod Uchtryd, remodelling including octagonal library (1794) demolished 1958.
- Herman Hill House, Haverfordwest (c. 1794)
- Llanerchaeron, Ciliau Aeron, Ceredigion (c. 1794)
- Llysnewydd, Henllan, Ceredigion (1795)
- Whitson Court, near Newport (1795)
- Glanwysc Villa, Llangattock (Crickhowell) (c. 1795)
- Llysnwydd house, Llangeler (c. 1795) attributed on stylistic grounds demolished 1971.
- Temple Druid House, Maenclochog (1795)
- Castle House, later replaced by Old College, Aberystwyth University, (1795)
- The Priory Cardigan, Ceredigion (1795)
- Clytha Park gates, (1797)
- Llanerchaeron, St Non's Church (1798) attributed on stylistic grounds
- Harpton Court, Old Radnor, remodelled (1805) demolished 1956 apart from the service range
- Hawarden Castle, enlargement (1807)
- Nanteos Mansion, planned replanning and new dairy and lodges (1814) not executed
- Rheola House, Resolven (1814–18)
- Picton Memorial, Carmarthen (1827–28) demolished 1846
- Extension block of Plas Gelli, Talsarn, Ceredigion

=== Work in Ireland ===
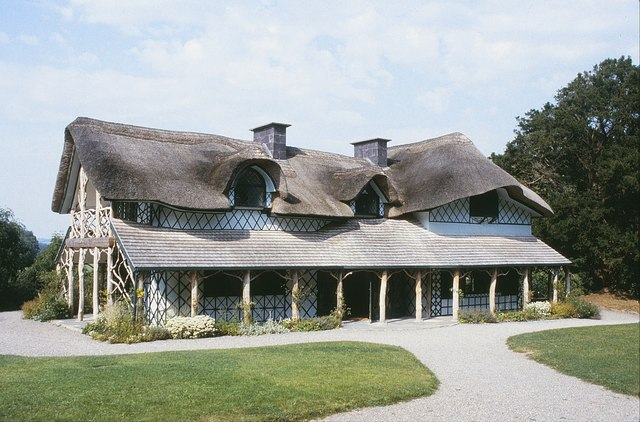
Swiss Cottage, Cahir

- House for Countess Shannon, County Cork (1796). Unbuilt.
- Ballindoon House (c. 1800) Kingsborough, Derry, County Sligo for Stafford-King-Harmon family. House and stable block.
- Killymoon Castle, near Cookstown, County Tyrone (1801–1807). Castle originally built in 1671. Rebuilt in Norman style by Nash for Col. William Stewart at an alleged cost of £80,000. Now well maintained as home of the Coulter family. The parkland is now used as a golf course.
- Lissan Rectory, County Tyrone (1807). Italianate Villa.
- Kilwaughter Castle, in Kilwaughter, near Larne, County Antrim (1807). New castellated mansion built for E. J. Agnew incorporating an earlier house (ruined 1951).
- Caledon House, County Tyrone (1808–1810), for the Du Pré Alexander, 2nd Earl of Caledon. Enlargement and embellishment of an earlier house (1779) by Thomas Cooley with two single storey domed wings connected by a colonnade of coupled Ionic columns; Nash redecorated the oval drawing room.
- Vice-Regal Lodge, Phoenix Park, Dublin (present-day Áras an Uachtaráin, public residence of the President of Ireland; 1808, entrance lodges only).
- St. John's Church of Ireland church Valentia Island (1815).
- St John's Church Caledon, Count Tyrone (1808). Alterations including timber spire. Spire replaced in stone to same design 1830.

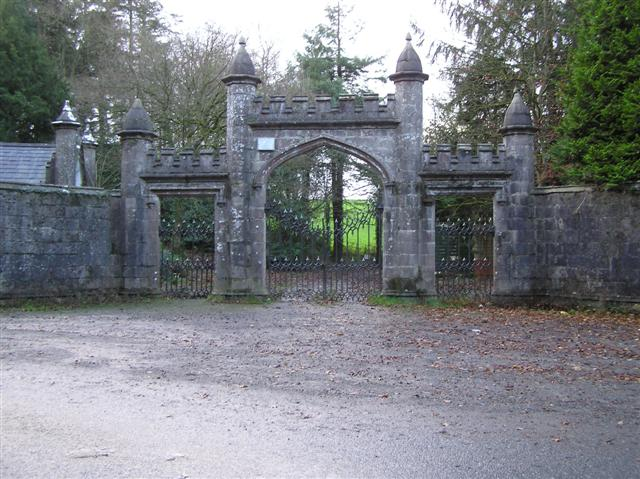
Gatehouse at Castle Leslie

- St. Paul's Church of Ireland church in Cahir, County Tipperary (1816–1818). Cruciform plan.
- Rockingham House, Boyle, County Roscommon (1810). Originally two-storey with curved central bow, fronted by a semi-circular Ionic colonnade, and surmounted by a dome. Built for the King Harmon family. Extra floor added by others. Burnt in fire 1957; subsequently demolished. Parkland now a public park and amenity.
- Rockingham lakeside gazebo.
- Rockingham Gothic Chapel. Roofless.
- Rockingham Castle. Nash may have contributed to picturesque island castle ruin.
- Swiss cottage, Cahir County Tipperary (1810–1814) Cottage ornée.
- City Gaol, Limerick, County Limerick (1811–1814).
- Lough Cutra Castle, Gort, County Galway (1811–1817). Built for Charles Vereker, subsequently Viscount Gort.
- Shane's Castle in Randalstown, County Antrim (1812–1816). Alterations to 17th century castle for Charles O'Neill, 1st Earl O'Neill, consisting of lakeside terrace, and battlemented conservatory with round headed windows, watch-tower and look-out. Burnt down in 1816 before Nash's plans were completed.
- Burne Lodge. Crawfordsburn Park, County Down (1812). 2-storey gate lodge with octagonal room at first-floor level.

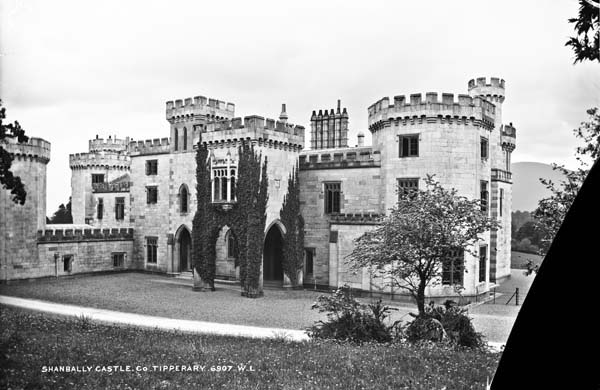
Shanbally Castle

- Shanbally Castle, near Clogheen, County Tipperary (1818–1819). Built for Cornelius O'Callaghan, 1st Viscount Lismore; largest of Nash's Irish Castles; demolished and dynamited 1960.
- Gracefield Lodge, County Laois, for a Mrs Kavanagh (1817).
- Erasmus Smith School, Cahir, County Tipperary (1818).
- Tynan Abbey, Tynan, County Armagh (1820). Remodelled in Tudor Gothic style for Sir James Stronge; gutted by fire 1980. Drawings destroyed after being photographed.
- St. Luran's Church of Ireland, Derryloran parish, Cookstown (1822). Cost £2,769.4s.71/2d. Early English style. Rebuilt 1859–61, apart from tower.
- Woodpark Lodge, Co. Armagh. Alterations (1830s).
- St. Beaidh church, Ardcarn, County Roscommon. Alterations including tower which was an eyecatcher to Rockingham House.
- Somerset House, Coleraine for a Mr Richardson. Date unknown. Unexecuted.
- Mountain Lodge, County Tipperary for Viscount Lismore. Date unknown. Now in a state of disrepair.
- Castle Leslie, County Monaghan. Date unknown. Gateways and gate lodge.
- 80–82 Chapel Street, Cookstown, County Tyrone. Dower house to Killymoon. Date unknown.
- Finaghy House, Belfast. Date unknown.

=== Work in Scotland ===
Nash's only known work in Scotland is:

- St. Mary's Isle, Kirkcudbright, an enclosure around family graves (1796)

== See also ==
- Buildings and architecture of Brighton and Hove

== Sources ==
- Arnold, Dana. "Burton, Decimus". Oxford Dictionary of National Biography (online ed.). Oxford University Press. doi:10.1093/ref:odnb/4125. (Subscription, Wikipedia Library access or UK public library membership required.)
- Arnold, Dana (2005). Rural Urbanism: London Landscapes in the Early 19th Century. Manchester University Press. ISBN 978-0-719-06820-1.
- Baker, J.N.L. (1954). "Jesus College". In Salter, H.E.; Lobel, Mary D. (eds.). A History of the County of Oxford Volume III – The University of Oxford. Victoria County History. Research, University of London. ISBN 978-0-7129-1064-4.
- Caves, R. W. (2004). Encyclopedia of the City. Routledge. ISBN 978-0-415-25225-6.
- Cherry, Bridget; Pevsner, Nikolaus (2002). London 4: North. The Buildings of England. New Haven, US and London: Yale University Press. ISBN 978-0-300-09653-8.
- Colvin, Howard (1978). A Biographical Dictionary of British Architects 1600–1840 (2nd ed.). New York: Facts on File, Inc. ISBN 0-87196-442-2.
- Colvin, Howard (1995). A Biographical Dictionary of British Architects 1600–1840 (3rd ed.). Yale University Press. ISBN 9780300060911.
- Curl, James Stevens (1999). The Dictionary of Architecture. Vol. 1 Aba - Byz. Oxford University Press. ISBN 978-0-19-860678-9.
- Davis, Terence (1966). John Nash: The Prince Regent's Architect. London: Country Life.
- "Decimus Burton". Dictionary of Scottish Architects. Archived from the original on 26 February 2020.
- "John Nash". Dictionary of Ulster Biography. Archived from the original on 5 July 2008.
- "John Nash (1752-1835)". English Heritage.
- "Decimus Burton and Richard Turner - Great Buildings Online". www.greatbuildings.com.
- Griffith, Rhys (2019). "Proceedings, 2019" (PDF). Transactions of the Woolhope Naturalists' Field Club. 67: 16–17. Archived (PDF) from the original on 29 December 2021.
- Harris, John; de Bellaigue, Geoffrey; Miller, Oliver (1969). Buckingham Palace and its treasures. London: Thomas Nelsons & Sons. OCLC 62972469.
- Hilling, John B. (2018). The Architecture of Wales: From the First to the Twenty-First Century. Cardiff: University of Wales Press. ISBN 978-1-78683-285-6.
- Historic England. "The Bath House (Grade I) (1182390)". National Heritage List for England.
- Historic England. "6, York Gate, 1-18 York Terrace, Regent's Park NW1 (Grade I) (1066044)". National Heritage List for England.
- Jones, Christopher (2017). Picturesque Urban Planning - Tunbridge Wells and the Suburban Ideal: The Development of the Calverley Estate 1825 - 1855. University of Oxford, Department of Continuing Education.
- Magill, Frank N. (2013). The 17th and 18th Centuries: Dictionary of World Biography. Vol. 4. London: Routledge. ISBN 978-1-135-92414-0.
- Major, Joanne; Murden, Sarah (2017). A Georgian Heroine: The Intriguing Life of Rachel Charlotte Williams Biggs. Pen and Sword. ISBN 9781473863460.
- Mansbridge, Michael (1991). John Nash: A Complete Catalogue. New York: Rizzoli. ISBN 0-8478-1308-8.
- ""James Burton [Haliburton]", Oxford Dictionary of National Biography". Oxford Dictionary of National Biography (online ed.). Oxford University Press. 2004. doi:10.1093/ref:odnb/50182. (Subscription, Wikipedia Library access or UK public library membership required.)
- Pevsner, Nikolaus; Radcliffe, Edith (1970) [1951]. Cornwall. Buildings of England. London: Penguin Books. ISBN 0-300-09589-9.
- Port, M.H. (2006). Six Hundred New Churches: The Church Building Commission 1818–1856 (2 ed.). Yale University Press. ISBN 978-1-904965-08-4.
- Rees, T. M. (1959). "John Nash (1752-1835)". Dictionary of Welsh Biography.
- Sherfield, Ian (1994). East Cowes Castle The Seat of John Nash Esq. A Pictorial History. Canon Press.
- Stern, Robert A.M.; Fishman, David; Tilove, Jacob (2013). Paradise Planned: The Garden Suburb and the Modern City. The Monacelli Press. ISBN 978-1580933261.
- Stroud, Dorothy (1962). Humphry Repton. London: Country Life.
- Stroud, Dorothy (1984). Sir John Soane, architect. London: Faber & Faber. ISBN 978-0-571-13050-4.
- Suggett, Richard (1995). John Nash Architect in Wales. Royal Commission on the Ancient and Historical Monuments of Wales. ISBN 1-871184-16-9.
- Summerson, John (1980). The Life and Work of John Nash, Architect. Cambridge, Mass.: The MIT Press. ISBN 0-262-19190-3.
- Torrens, H. S. "Parkinson, James (bap. 1730, d. 1813), land agent and museum proprietor". Oxford Dictionary of National Biography (online ed.). Oxford University Press. doi:10.1093/ref:odnb/21370. (Subscription, Wikipedia Library access or UK public library membership required.)
- Tyack, Geoffrey (2013). John Nash Architect of the Picturesque. English Heritage. ISBN 978-1-84802-102-0.
- Williams, Guy (1990). Augustus Pugin Versus Decimus Burton: A Victorian Architectural Duel. London: Cassell Publishers Ltd. ISBN 978-0-304-31561-1.
