= Studio Vista =

British publishing company

- Company type: Private
- Industry: Publishing
- Founded: 1961
- Founder: Cecil Harmsworth King
- Successor: Cassell & Co.
- Headquarters: London, United Kingdom
- Products: Books

Studio Vista was a British publishing company founded in 1961 that specialised in leisure and design topics. In the 1960s, the firm published works by a number of authors who went on to be noted designers.

The imprint was later integrated into Cassell.

== History ==
Studio Vista was founded by Cecil Harmsworth King and it was then purchased by the Rev. Timothy Beaumont, later Baron Beaumont of Whitley, with funding from Beaumont's fortune. In 1961, David Mark Herbert joined the firm, becoming its editorial director and then chief executive. After Beaumont entered politics, he sold his publishing interests and Studio Vista was bought by the American firm Collier Macmillan in 1968. In 1969, the publisher Frances Lincoln joined the firm as an editorial assistant, staying for six years and rising to the position of managing editor. In 1975, Frances Lincoln led a strike at the firm after the new owners threatened to make 40 people redundant.

In the late 1950s and early 1960s, some of Studio Vista's titles (including William Klein's 1959 photo essay on Rome) and series (such as the Vista Travel guides and The Pocket Poets) were published under the publisher names of "Vista Books" and "Edward Hulton".

== Books ==
Among the notable books published by the firm were The Nature of Design by the furniture designer David Pye (1964) and Graphics Handbook by the graphic designer Ken Garland (1966) (both in the Studio Vista/Van Nostrand Reinhold Art Paperbacks series edited by John Lewis), Norman Potter's What is a Designer: Education and Practice (1969), and Gillian Naylor's The Bauhaus (1968).

The firm also published a number of books by the Romanian architect Serban Cantacuzino.

== Book series ==
- Aquarium Paperbacks
- Blues Paperbacks (edited by Paul Oliver)
- Christie's South Kensington Collectors Series (in association with Christie's Contemporary Art)
- City Buildings
- Collectors' Blue Books
- Creative Sewing Series (in association with the Singer Company)
- Elements of Painting Series
- Facts of Print
- Field Sports Handbooks
- Gold Series
- Great Ages of World Architecture
- Great Drawings of the World
- Hadfield Anthologies
- Knowing and Doing
- Leaders of Modern Thought
- Movie Paperbacks (jointly published in the U.S. as Praeger Film Library by Praeger Publishing and by University of California Press)
- New Directions in Architecture
- Picturebacks (also referred to as: Studio Vista | Dutton Picturebacks) (published in the U.S. by E. P. Dutton)
- Planning and Cities
- Plan Your Home
- Pocket How-To-Do-Its (also known as: Pocket How To Do It) (jointly published in the U.S. by Watson-Guptill)
- The Pocket Poets
- Rockbooks
- Small Garden Library
- Studio Drawing Books
- Studio Handbooks
- Studio Paperbacks
- Studio Vista/Van Nostrand Reinhold Art Paperbacks
- Vision + Value Series
- Vista Travel
- Visual History of Modern Britain

== See also ==
- Diana Bloomfield
- Chris Marker
