= Mabel Alleyne =

British wood engraver

Mabel Charlotte Alleyne (31 March 1896 – 15 August 1961) was a British wood-engraver. She studied wood-engraving at the London County Council School of Photo-engraving and Lithography in Bolt Court, London, where her teacher was R. John Beedham, and exhibited with the Society of Wood Engravers.

== Biography ==
Alleyne was born in Southampton in 1896, the daughter and only child of Bouverie Colebrooke Alleyne, part of a wealthy family originally from Barbados, and Ada Clements. She studied at Goldsmiths College and the Royal Academy Schools. She appears not to have married.

== Wood engravings and other artistic output ==
Alleyne exhibited with the Society of Wood Engravers in 1933, 1936 and 1938. Her wood engravings were reproduced in the London Mercury; the September 1933 issue reproduced Night, and the July 1934 issue Flower Study. The 4th edition of Beedham's Wood Engraving (1935) reproduces Autumn Rain.

In 1926 the Saint Loup Press, San Remo, published an edition of 100 copies of Nursery Rhymes, written and illustrated by Alleyne with hand coloured wood engravings. In the 1930s she wrote, illustrated and printed The Angry Cheese and Other Queer Fancies; this was a very Private Press production with some 18 wood engravings, some hand coloured. She also presented to her friend Elizabeth Rivers a hand printed illustrated poem entitled Ethne.

She produced a colour dust jacket for The Way the World is Going (1928) by H. G. Wells, colour illustrations for Ivor Macleod's The Old Views and the New Vision (1929) and illustrations for The Singing Farmer: a translation of Vergil's "Georgics" (1947).

She also produced colour lithographs and oil paintings.

== Legacy ==
Mabel Alleyne is a minor figure in the wood engraving revival at the beginning of the twentieth century. She is almost invisible in the literature, and is recorded in the records of the Society of Wood Engravers, and in the credits in the London Mercury, as M. Alleyne rather than Mabel Alleyne.
