= Dorothy Stroud =

English museum curator and biographer (1910–1997)

Dorothy Nancy Stroud MBE
- Born: 11 January 1910; London, United Kingdom
- Died: 27 December 1997 (aged 87); London, United Kingdom
- Known for: Art History, Arts administration

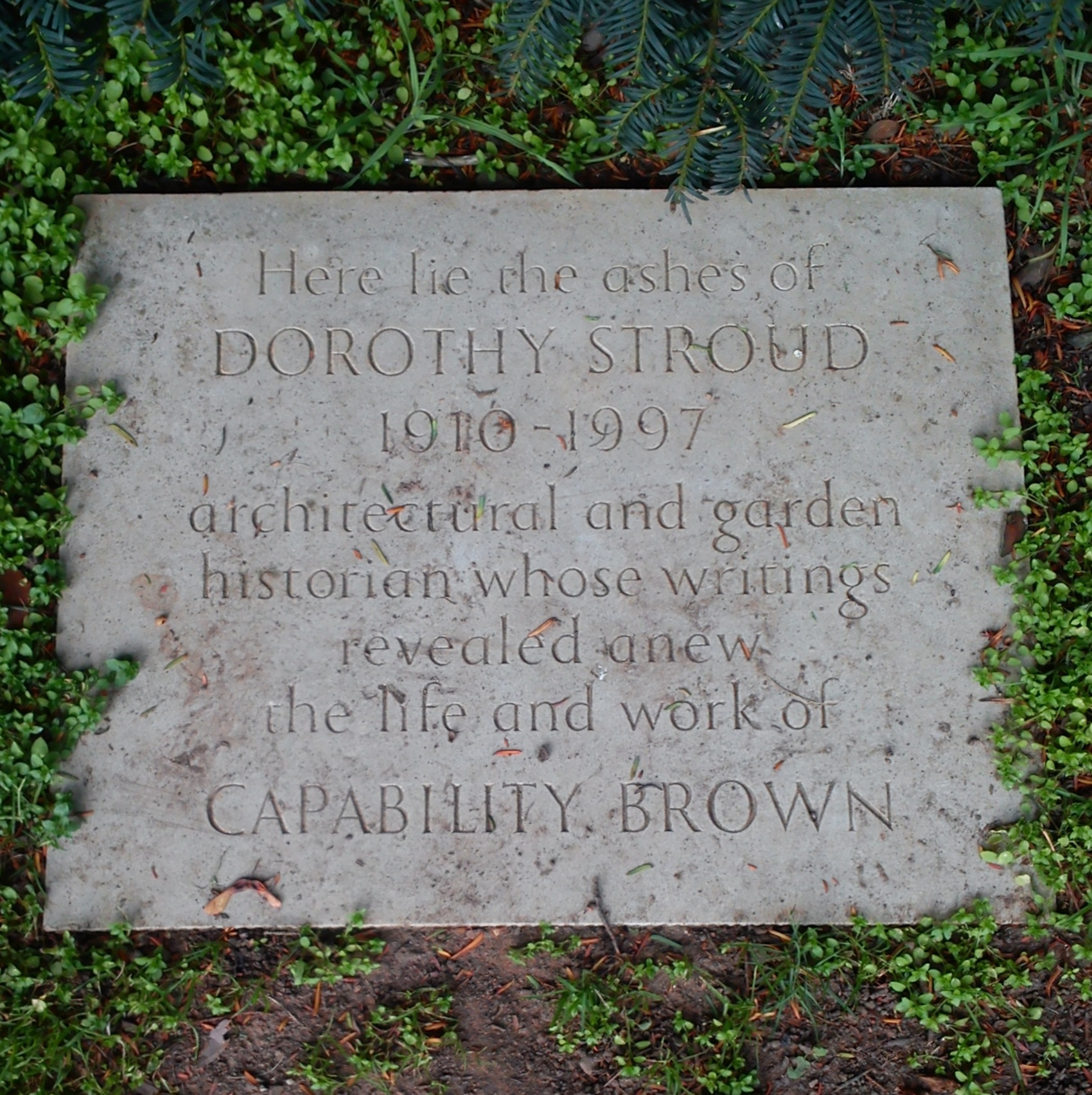
A memorial at Croome Park

Dorothy Nancy Stroud MBE (11 January 1910 – 27 December 1997) was an English museum curator and biographer.

After Stroud died in 1997, her ashes went to Croome Park. A plaque by the statue of Capability Brown records her role in renewing interest in his life and works.

== Selected publications ==
- Capability Brown. Country Life, 1950. (2nd, Country Life, 1957) (3rd, Faber & Faber, London, 1975)
- The architecture of Sir John Soane. Studio Books, 1961.
- Humphry Repton. Country Life, 1962.
- Henry Holland, his life and architecture. Country Life, 1966. ISBN 9781199539489
- George Dance, architect, 1741–1825. Faber & Faber, London, 1971.
