= Sandridge Park =

Country house in Devon, England

Coordinates: 50.3971°N 3.6054°W

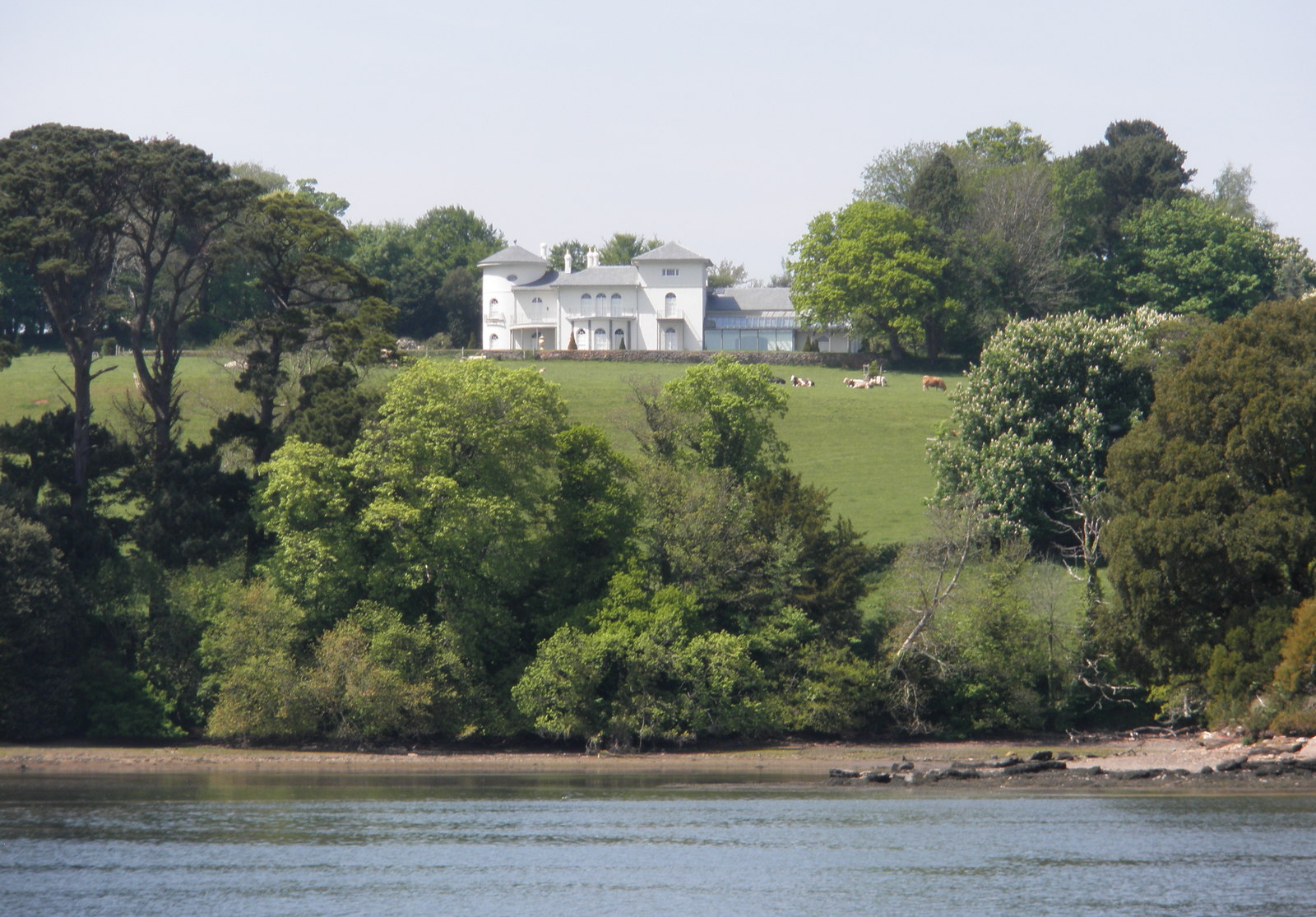
Sandridge Park

Sandridge Park, near Stoke Gabriel, Devon, is an English country house in the Italianate style, designed by John Nash around 1805 for the Dowager Lady Ashburton, née Elizabeth Baring, the wife of John Dunning, 1st Baron Ashburton. It is a Grade II* listed building. By 1822 it was leased to Sir Robert Newman.

It is considered to be a late intimation of Nash's development of the Italianate style. Commissioned by the dowager Lady Ashburton as a country retreat, this small country house clearly shows the transition between the picturesque of William Gilpin and Nash's yet to be fully evolved Italianism. While this house can still be described as Regency, its informal asymmetrical plan together with its loggias and balconies of both stone and wrought iron; tower and low pitched roof clearly are very similar to the fully Italianate design of Cronkhill.

== History ==
Sandridge, on high ground at the head of the River Dart estuary, was held by the Sandridges under the Bishop of Exeter in Henry II's reign. Captain John Davis, the great Elizabethan navigator and explorer, was probably born at Sandridge Barton, the manor farm, in 1543. The Nash house took the place of the former house, which belonged to the descendants of Sir Thomas Pomeroy until the eighteenth century. The house and estate came into the Gilbert family of Compton Castle, Devon, descendants of Sir Humphrey Gilbert (half brother of Sir Walter Raleigh), via the marriage of Humphrey Gilbert (died 1715) to Joan, daughter of Roger Pomeroy. Their son John Gilbert and grandson Pomeroy Gilbert owned the Sandridge house and estate with Pomeroy (died 1770) the owner in 1763; it was unoccupied in 1951, "the park ragged and decaying". Restoration included preservation of the existing fabric and the addition of pergolas to the east and west of the existing building. The work was awarded the Highly Commended, Single Dwelling Category Architect of the Year Awards 2006.
