= Serban Cantacuzino (architect) =

Romanian architect

Șerban Cantacuzino, CBE (6 September 1928 in Paris – 22 February 2018 in London) was a Romanian architect and the founder and president of Pro Patrimonio foundation.

Cantacuzino was the son of architect, painter and essayist Prince George Matei Cantacuzino, of the noble Cantacuzino family. His grandmother descended from the Wallachian ruler Gheorghe Bibescu and his mother Sanda was the daughter of Barbu Dimitrie Știrbei, also of a family of Romanian aristocrats. Following his parents' separation and his mother settling in England with her children in 1939, Cantacuzino was educated at Winchester College and Magdalene College, Cambridge. He was elected a Fellow of the Royal Institute of British Architects and was the secretary of the Royal Fine Arts Commission for more than a decade.

He was made a Commander of the Most Excellent Order of the British Empire (CBE) in the 1988 New Year Honours.

Cantacuzino was survived by his widow, Anne, and their daughters Ilinca and Marina.

== Selected publications ==
- Modern houses of the world. Studio Vista, London, 1966.
- Great modern architecture. Studio Vista, Dutton, 1966.
- New uses for old buildings. Architectural Press, London, 1975. ISBN 085139499X
- Wells Coates:A Monograph. Gordon Fraser, London, 1978. ISBN 0900406593
- Saving old buildings. Architectural Press, London, 1980. ISBN 0851394981
