= R. John Beedham =

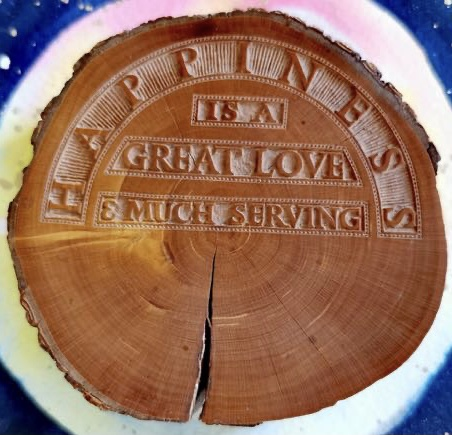
A small wood engraving by Ralph John Beedham.

Ralph John Beedham (1879–1975) was a British wood-engraver. He occupies a unique position in the history of twentieth-century wood-engraving because, being a formschneider, he was probably the last person in Britain to serve an apprenticeship as a professional reproductive wood-engraver.

== Biography ==
Beedham was born in 1879 in Whitecross Street, Cripplegate, London, and, at the age of 13, was apprenticed for six years to an old established firm of wood engravers, Hare & Company in Essex Street, Strand. By the end of his apprenticeship he found that the skills that he had acquired had been replaced by photo-mechanical processes of reproduction of images.

He was one of three professional reproductive wood engravers who found that he could use his skills for teaching. He taught evening classes in wood engraving at the London County Council School of Photo-engraving and Lithography in Bolt Court, where he taught, among others, Noel Rooke, Joan Hassall, Mabel Alleyne and Diana Bloomfield. The other two were Bernard Sleigh, who taught at the Birmingham School of Printing, and W.T. Smith, who taught at the Slade.

He was a lifelong vegetarian, pacifist and a conscientious objector, and found it impossible to work on the blocks that Robert Gibbings was engraving for The History of Bovril.

Ralph John Beedham married Dora Beedham (Dora Spong) in October 1910. Dora was a British Suffragette as were her mother and sisters, and also vegetarian. They had two children, Ruth and David.

He carried on engraving to the age of 83, and died in 1975, his ashes buried in the graveyard at Brill, Buckinghamshire, where he spent the final years of his life with his daughter Ruth and her husband Robert Wickenden.

== His work in wood engraving ==
In 1917 Beedham went to Ditchling, where he worked with Eric Gill at the Guild of St Joseph and St Dominic. Gill instructed him in lettering, and Beedham became his assistant until Gill died. He worked with Robert Gibbings and became friendly with both. The work that he carried out was the clearing of white areas from the block when Gill and Gibbings had finished the main engraving. This was a time-consuming process, and the two engravers would have been unable to produce the volume of wood engravings that they did without his help. He also engraved designs by Gill and others (he engraved Gill's initial letters for the Golden Cockerel Press edition of Lamia), and produced facsimile wood engravings. He reproduced the wood engravings for editions of Observationes Anatomicae Selectiores Amstelodamensium and The Book of Orders, printed by Gibbings in 1938 and 1940 at the University of Reading. When Gibbings was producing his engravings for the Limited Editions Club edition of The Voyage of HMS Beagle he cut out four engravings from his copy of the book for Beedham to reproduce.

He worked with John Farleigh doing the same work, and worked for the Saint Dominic's Press, the Gregynog Press, the Golden Cockerel Press and the Shakespeare Head Press among others. At the Saint Dominic's Press he wrote a book on the technical aspects of wood engraving which ran into seven editions.

== Overview of his life and work ==
Beedham was a man of contradictions. He was never out of work, although the trade for which he had spent six years training had disappeared.

He was a modest man and claimed he could not draw and never engraved any work that he had created. However, his own book on wood engraving contains his own drawings and diagrams that he engraved. At the Gregynog Press he engraved the blocks based on the designs by Edward Burne-Jones for the press's edition of Eros and Psyche by Robert Bridges. His faithful reproductions, however, lack the vigour and artistic sensitivity of blocks engraved by William Morris using the same designs.

In spite of this he played an important role in the revival of wood engraving at the beginning of the twentieth century. In 1904 he taught Noel Rooke, the father of modern wood engraving, the skills of wood engraving. He enabled Gill and Gibbings to produce a volume of engravings that would have been beyond them with his help. He was sympathetic to the modern generations of wood engravers, and wrote in a new chapter to the 5th edition of his book: "The modern revival of wood-engraving, which came just after the war, is quite different in style from any that preceded it. The artist and engraver are now one, as they should be where original work is to be done."

Gibbings paid him a tribute by dedicating his last book, Till I end my Song (1957), to him.

== Selected publications ==
- Wood Engraving (1929)
