= The Way the World Is Going =

1928 book by H. G. Wells

- First edition dust jacket
- Author: H. G. Wells
- Cover artist: Mabel Alleyne
- Language: English
- Genre: Nonfiction
- Publisher: Ernest Benn Ltd
- Publication date: 1928
- Publication place: United Kingdom
- Media type: Print (Hardback)
- Pages: 301

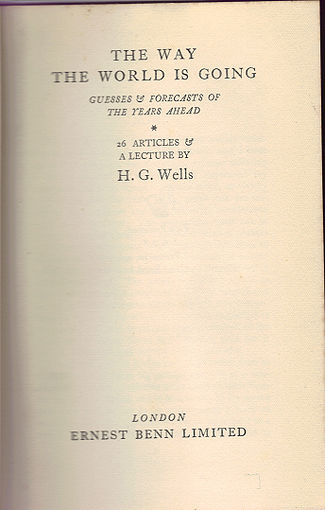
Title page

The Way the World Is Going is a 1928 nonfiction book written by British author H. G. Wells.

The book is a compilation of 26 articles and a lecture published in the United Kingdom and the United States throughout 1927. The topics range from politics to science and from social affairs to economics. Originally published in the Sunday Express in the UK, and the New York Times in the US, the articles provided Wells with the best medium to air his social and political agendas. In his opening notes to the book Wells expressed his frustration at the “editorial interference” that resulted in his work appearing only after, “suffering a certain amount of mutilation.” Although this introduction appeared in both the UK and US editions, Wells subsequently had to clarify that his complaints applied to the Sunday Express only, and not the New York Times, which published the articles essentially intact.

The articles are a mixture of predictions and commentary based on the science and politics of the time.

The book is similar to Wells' earlier 1925 work A Year of Prophesying. Unlike this earlier work, The Way the World Is Going is marked by both a dark disillusionment and decaying optimism over the state of the world at the time.

== Chapters ==
The following is a list of the Chapters (articles) with their original publication dates:

1. Man Becomes a Different Animal. Delusions about Human Fixity. (January 9, 1927)
2. What is Happening in China? Does it Foreshadow a New Government in the World? (January 23, 1927)
3. What is Fascism? Whither is it taking Italy? (February 9, 1927)
4. Doubts of Democracy. New Experiments in Government. (March 20, 1927)
5. Democracy under Revision: a Lecture delivered at Sorbonne on March 15, 1927.
6. The Absurdity of British Politics. A Shadow on the Whole World. What has to be Done about it? (August 7, 1927)
7. Baldwinism a Danger to the World. Wanted, a Coalition Government. The Deadlock and the Way out. (November 7, 1927)
8. Communism and Witchcraft. (August 21, 1927)
9. The Future of Labour. The Struggle between Capital and Labour. Controversial Hallucinations. (September 4, 1927)
10. What is the British Empire worth to Mankind? Meditations of an Empire Citizen. (September 18, 1927)
11. The Present uselessness and Danger of Aeroplanes. A Problem in Organization. (February 20, 1927)
12. Changes in the Art of War. Are Armies needed any longer? The Twilight of the Guards. (March 6, 1927)
13. Delusions about World Peace. The Price of Peace. (June 12, 1927)
14. The Possibility of War between Britain and America. Such a war is being prepared now. What are intelligent people to do about it? (October 2, 1927)
15. The Remarkable Vogue of Broadcasting: will it continue? (April 3, 1927)
16. The Silliest Film. Will Machinery make Robots of Men? (April 17, 1927 - review of Metropolis)
17. Is Life becoming Happier? (May 1, 1927)
18. Experimenting with Marriage. Legal Recognition of Current Realities. (June 26. 1927)
19. New Light on Mental Life: Mr. J.W. Dunne's Experiments with Dreaming. (July 10, 1927)
20. Popular Feeling and the Advancement of Science. Anti-vivisection. (July 24, 1927)
21. The New American People: what is wrong with it? (May 15, 1927)
22. Outrages in Defense of Order. The Proposed Murder of two American Socialists. (May 29, 1927)
23. Some Plain Words to Americans. Are the Americans a Sacred People? Is International Criticism restricted to the Eastward Position? (October 16, 1927)
24. Fuel Getting in the Modern World. (October 30, 1927)
25. The Man of Science and the Expressive Man. To Whom does the Future Belong? Some Thoughts about Ivan Pavloff and George Bernard Shaw. (November 13, 1927)
26. The Future of the Novel. Difficulties of the Modern Novelist. (11 December 1927)
27. Is a Belief in the Spirit World growing? Why many Sensible Men continue to doubt and disregard it. What is immortality? (December 25, 1927)

== Selected predictions and conjectures ==
1. The League of Nations. Wells predicted the collapse of the League of Nations. Wells described the League as "ill-planned and ill-supported" and "as a guarantee against graver quarrels, it is beneath contempt."
2. Second World War. Wells believed that the signs of a second world war were as clear in 1927 as they were in 1907. Wells believed that there was a high probability that the war would erupt between the United States and United Kingdom as a result of the growing competition over naval armament and "wholesome brotherly jealousy". He also believed that both nations would compete for an alliance with the Japanese Empire.
