= Joan Hassall =

British wood engraver and book illustrator (1906–1988)

Joan Hassall in 1980

Joan Hassall OBE (3 March 1906 – 6 March 1988) was an English wood engraver and book illustrator. Her subject matter ranged from natural history through poetry to illustrations for English literary classics. In 1972 she was elected the first woman Master of the Art Workers' Guild and in 1987 was awarded the OBE (Order of the British Empire).

== Biography ==
Born at 88 Kensington Park Road, Notting Hill, London, Joan Hassall was the daughter of the artist John Hassall, famous for his poster "Skegness is so bracing", and his second wife, Constance Brooke Webb.

Her letters show how close she was to her younger brother, Christopher Hassall, and his early death affected her greatly. She addressed him as 'Topher' in her letters to him, until his wife, Eve, objected, whereupon she switched to 'Bruth'. Her portrait of Christopher is now in the National Portrait Gallery.

She attended Parsons Mead School and then trained as a teacher at the Froebel Institute. Her experiences at a rough East London secondary school convinced her that she did not want to be a teacher. She worked as her father's secretary for two years and then attended the Royal Academy Schools from 1928 to 1933.

In 1931, to help a friend because numbers for the class were dropping, she began evening classes in wood engraving at the London Central School of Photo-engraving and Lithography in Fleet Street, where her teacher was R. John Beedham. The discovery of wood engraving had a profound influence on the rest of her life.

== The early years ==
She canvassed the London publishers for commissions for wood engravings, without success, until Heinemann commissioned her in 1936 to engrave the title page of her brother Christopher's book of poems, Devil’s Dyke. She later discovered that her £5 fee had been deducted from her brother's royalties. She went on to illustrate a number of her brother's books, but the most important outcome for her was the commission to illustrate Francis Brett Young's Portrait of a Village (1937). She spent a great deal of time travelling around the area of Evesham and Pershore to make preliminary drawings for her wood engravings and produced a book that is generally considered to be one of her best.

In 1940 Hassall produced an equally successful set of wood engravings to illustrate Cranford by Mrs Gaskell. She carried out a great deal of research into the costumes of the period, and was able to make preparatory drawings of a suitably slim friend wearing period costumes from the extensive collection of Cecil Willett Cunnington, who lived nearby.

== The years in Scotland ==
The Marriage of Robin Redbreast and the Wren, Saltire Chapbook No. 4 (1945)

During World War II John Kingsley Cook, a tutor of Book Illustration and Drawing at Edinburgh College of Art, suggested that Joan Hassall act as his replacement, a post that she accepted. This was a time that was, in many ways, profitable for Hassall. She was commissioned to produce a series of chapbooks for the Saltire Society, and established links with the publishers Oliver & Boyd that led to a number of commissions. She designed all aspects of the chapbooks, including the typography, and went on to be responsible for the overall design of some of her other books. She was, at times, very critical of how her work was reproduced in books, and turned down commissions from publishers in whom she did not have confidence.

When she returned to Kensington Park Road she had her own hand press and produced a range of ephemeral publications over the years – chapbooks, Christmas cards, fliers for the local Anglican church et al. – as well as using it to print her wood engravings. She took her press with her to Malham, and carried on pulling proofs of her wood engravings to present to visitors.

== The later years ==
The period after the war was one of great activity for Hassall. In 1946 she illustrated 51 Poems by Mary Webb, and then, in 1947, Our Village by Mary Russell Mitford. The wood engravings were, once again, based on drawings of models wearing authentic period costumes. 1947 saw the publication too of A Child's Garden of Verses by Robert Louis Stevenson, a charmingly illustrated book that was reprinted several times, and of Eric Linklater's Sealskin Trousers. The publisher Rupert Hart-Davis produced a limited edition of 50 copies of the latter, printed by Hague and Gill and bound by the London bookbinding firm of Sangorski & Sutcliffe. Hassall recalls that Linklater, after a rather liquid lunch, sat back after signing 20 copies and announced that he was going to sign the rest 'J. B. Priestley'. None of these copies, if they exist, has ever come onto the market. She designed a new cover for the royal Photographic Society's The Photographic Journal and the first of her design appeared with the January 1947 issue.

1950 saw the publication of The Strange World of Nature by Bernard Gooch, another book based on meticulous observation, Hassall's trademark. In the same year she created 43 illustrations for The Collected Poems of Andrew Young; the wood engravings were used for several later editions.

Her skill came out strongly in the 1955 edition of The Oxford Nursery Rhyme Book by Iona and Peter Opie, where she had to produce some 150 wood engravings to blend in with the period stock blocks used by the Oxford University Press.

Between 1957 and 1962 Hassall produced wood engravings for a seven-volume edition of the novels of Jane Austen by the Folio Society. The edition has been reprinted many times by the Folio Society. Hassall had already worked for the society, illustrating two works by Trollope.

Her last major work was an edition of the poems of Robert Burns for the Limited Editions Club.

== Malham and retirement ==
Hassall retired to Malham, Yorkshire, in 1976. She had always suffered from bad health, which made it difficult to complete commissions and make a living. She had continued to live in her parents' house at 88 Kensington Park Road, and had had to take in lodgers to help maintain the house. In 1973 she inherited Priory Cottage, Malham, from an old friend, Greta Hopkins, and in 1976 she decided to retire there. Her eyesight was failing, and she was overwhelmed by money problems. She said in a letter to Tim Coombs "I often think how wonderful it would have been to live in 88 with an adequate income, as it was such a beautiful house, but it was a 24-year struggle to make ends meet."

She had known Malham since 1932 and had many friends there. Friends made at London continued to visit her, she had her cats and she had her music (she played the spinet, the organ, the flute and the viol). She had the Methodist Chapel at Malham and the Anglican church at Kirkby Malham (her faith had always been important to her).

Malham was her life at the end and she invited two friends from there, Norman Cawood and Barbara Hudson, to be her guests when she went to Buckingham Palace to receive the OBE.

Brian North Lee, her executor, said at her funeral: "Joan’s retirement at Malham was arguably the most happy period of her life." The warmth of his address typifies the feelings that Hassall's friends had for her. Another close friend, and former lodger at 88 Kensington Park Road, Norman Painting, gave the eulogy at her memorial service at St Giles in the Fields.

== An overview of Hassall's work ==
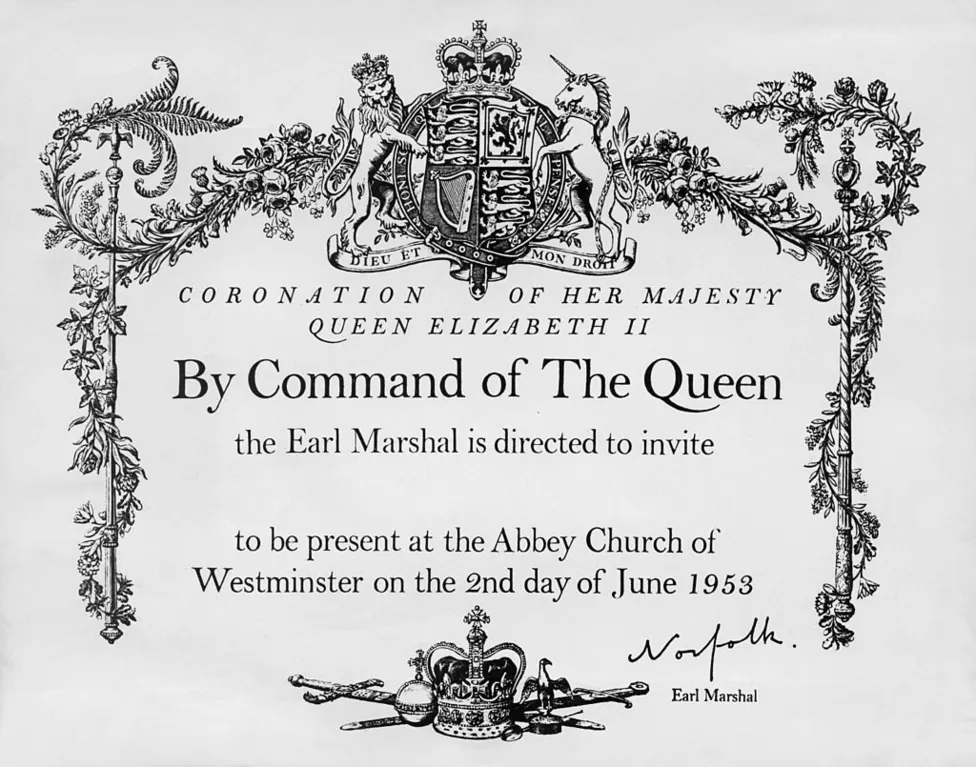
Queen Elizabeth II coronation invitation

Hassall's output consists largely of wood engravings. Some are independent engravings, mostly produced at the beginning of her career; the vast majority, however, are illustrations for books. Producing these illustrations, along with commercial commissions, was how Hassall earned her living. Her work tends to the small and meticulously observed, rather than the large and dramatic, the vignette rather than the full-page plate. Her place in the history of wood engraving is that of the highly skilled and valued practitioner rather than the innovator.

She produced many commercial and more ephemeral works – bookplates, letterheads, Christmas and other cards, menus and other printed material for British Transport Hotels, booklets for British Transport films, illustrations for magazines, etc.. Her style is easy to recognise, even when work is unsigned.

Most of her work is wood-engraved, but she also used scraperboard, line drawings, water colour and oils.

Some of her work was quite high-profile. In 1948 Hassall designed the £1 postage stamp issued in commemoration of the Royal Silver Wedding of King George VI and Queen Elizabeth; she was the first woman to have a stamp design accepted by the GPO.

She won the competition to design the invitation to the Coronation of Queen Elizabeth II; she had to use scraperboard to produce the final design as there was not enough time to produce a wood engraving for such a large and complex design. She also designed the personal invitation that Prince Charles received to the coronation.

David Chambers' book gives full listings of her work.
