= Temple Druid =

Coordinates: 51.910761°N 4.769129°W

Temple Druid: Welsh: Temple Druid
- Location within Pembrokeshire
- OS grid reference: SN0962927205
- Principal area: Pembrokeshire
- Preserved county: Dyfed
- Country: Wales
- Sovereign state: United Kingdom
- Post town: MAENCLOCHOG
- Postcode district: SA66
- Dialling code: 01437
- Police: Dyfed-Powys
- Fire: Mid and West Wales
- Ambulance: Welsh
- UK Parliament: Preseli Pembrokeshire

Temple Druid is a grade II listed John Nash house in west Wales, Pembrokeshire, Great Britain.

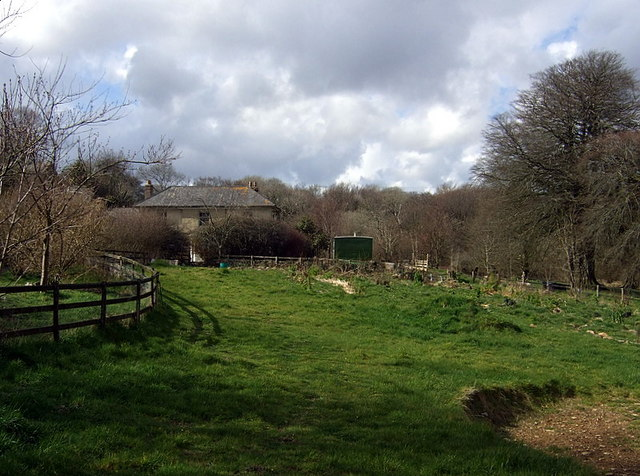
Temple Druid, the house

Temple Druid, named after a series of standing stones and cromlech, is a house located about 3/4 of mile (1.2 km) east of the village of Maenclochog.

== History ==
The house was designed and built for Henry Bulkeley by John Nash, architect to the Prince Regent, in c1795. The site was originally called Bwlch-y-Clawdd (Gap in the Hedge) but was renamed when the house was built. The house was designed as a hunting lodge, with stables and coach houses. The estate also included a farmhouse and three cottages which continue to be used.

Bulkeley lived in the house from 1806 until his death in 1821. Unfortunately the house was shortly after dismantled and the particulars of the house sold. The sales notice, described in the Cambrian Journal in 1821 states the following" An "excellent mansion house" on three floors, it contained six apartments for servants in the attic, eight bedrooms with three dressing rooms and a nursery on the first floor, and a "handsome drawing room", dining parlour, breakfast parlour, offices and "principal apartments fitted up with statuary marble chimney pieces" on the ground floor. The staircase is described as geometrical and made of stone, leading up to an elegant gallery."

The current house represents work done in c1830 when significant changes were made to the fabric of the building. The house suffered the loss of a wing and the stone staircase and gallery. However the front part of Nash's original square design remains intact. The associated farm buildings are grade II* listed and three cottages grade II.

== Standing Stones ==
There are many records attesting to the existence of a significant cromlech at Temple Druid. Apparently the cromlech had a headstone 13 ft (4.0 m) in diameter, raised 4 ft (1.2 m) above the ground on three supports. The time of destruction was c1800.

== Other Ancient Artifacts ==
In 1743 a stone was found with the inscription CURCAGNI FILI ANDAGELLI (Hiberno-Latin). In 1911 the stone was reported to be in the churchyard at Cenarth. The stone represent one of three found in the vicinity and appear to represent monuments in memory of three related family members. The two other stones (located at the nearby ruined church of Llandeilo) have inscriptions: ANDAGELLI FILI CAVETI and COIMAGMI FILI CAVETI (FILI meaning son of).
