= Diana Bloomfield =

Diana Bloomfield, née Wallace (25 November 1915 – 30 July 2010) was a British wood-engraver, best known for her bookplates and commercial work.

== Biography ==
Bloomfield grew up in Harrow, one of a family of four girls, and went to Harrow Art School. In 1934 she went to work at the Bank of England. There she met Kenneth Bloomfield, whom she married in 1938.

In 1947 she started to attend classes at the Hampstead Garden Suburb Institute, where she studied lettering with a pupil of Eric Gill and Edward Johnston, textile design, and wood-engraving.

== Her work in wood engraving ==
Bloomfield had one lesson from R. John Beedham who then fell ill. She experimented and began to engrave drawings from her sketch books. When she had been engraving for some time she was advised to send her work to Beatrice Warde, the editor of the Monotype Recorder. Warde was very encouraging and helpful, and recommended Bloomfield to a number of publishers, including the Oxford University Press and Penguin Books. She produced engravings for cover designs for the OUP World Classics and Standard Authors, and their quarterly Periodical. She also engraved cover roundels for the Penguin Classics and some 30 calligraphic titles for the Pocket Poets series published by Edward Hulton's Vista Books.

Another major part of her work was the 70-80 bookplates and letterheads that she engraved between 1953 and 1972. The major influence on this aspect of her work was Reynolds Stone, whom she described as the great master of engraved bookplates and engraved lettering, not just for this century, but for all time. Her bookplates rely on the flourishes and curlicues of Stone and Leo Wyatt rather than the classic simplicity and elegance of Eric Gill, Johnston and Philip Hagreen.

Bloomfield did produce wood engravings for some books. The first was a commission from Penguin - the Puffin Quartet of Poets (1958). This was followed by Come Hither (1960), a new edition of Walter de la Mare's classic anthology for children. The most elusive of her books with wood engravings is Twenty-five Poems by Evelyn Ansell (1963), published at the Vine Press in an edition of 100 copies. She illustrated nine books in all, seven with wood engravings, one - The Man's Book (1958) - with scraperboards and another - Great Palaces (1964) - with pen and ink drawings.

== Overview of her life and work ==
In terms of her training and later contacts Bloomfield, who was active in the 1950s, 1960s and early 1970s, stands rather apart from the mainstream of the wood engraving world of her period. She was not a member of the revived Society of Wood Engravers. Her work was largely commercial and she illustrated few books. She was, however, very highly regarded as an engraver of bookplates, and as a teacher of wood engraving at the City Literary Institute, London, the University of Sussex and the Lewes and District Visual Arts Association.
