= Norman Potter =

- Born: Norman Arthur Potter; 17 April 1923; London, England
- Died: 22 November 1995 (aged 72); Falmouth, Cornwall, England
- Occupations: Cabinetmaker, writer, educator
- Notable work: What is a Designer? (1969)

Norman Arthur Potter (17 April 1923 – 22 November 1995) was a cabinetmaker, political dissident, poet and author of What is a Designer?

== Life ==
By trade, Potter was a cabinetmaker and designer, a minimalist decades before the term became fashionable. He was a Christian anarchist and was imprisoned several times for his political actions. In 1949, he set up a workshop at Corsham in Wiltshire that produced modern furniture. In the late 1950s, Potter attained a full-time position teaching design at the Royal College of Art. In 1964, Potter, along with several colleagues, established a Construction School at the West of England College of Art and Design in Bristol. Potter sustained his political activism through this period, joining the student revolts of 1968. It was also in 1968 that Potter wrote What is a designer. A little over twenty years later, he followed up with Models & Constructs in 1990. Potter died of a heart attack in 1995 while bicycling in Falmouth.

== Books by Potter ==
"The first thing to learn about the deep structure of modern design is that it is relation-seeking and pleasurably so."

— Norman Potter, What is a designer, p.9
- What is a designer: things, places, messages. London: Hyphen Press, 2002. (ISBN 978-0-907259-16-9)
- Models & Constructs: margin notes to a design culture. London: Hyphen Press, 1990. (ISBN 978-0-907259-04-6)

In the late 1960s Potter taught at Chesterfield College of Art and Design and had a great effect on their Environmental Design where he showed that the ability to write reports and be creative with a typewriter was just as important as drawing and design.
