= Longner Hall =

Country house in Atcham, Shropshire, England

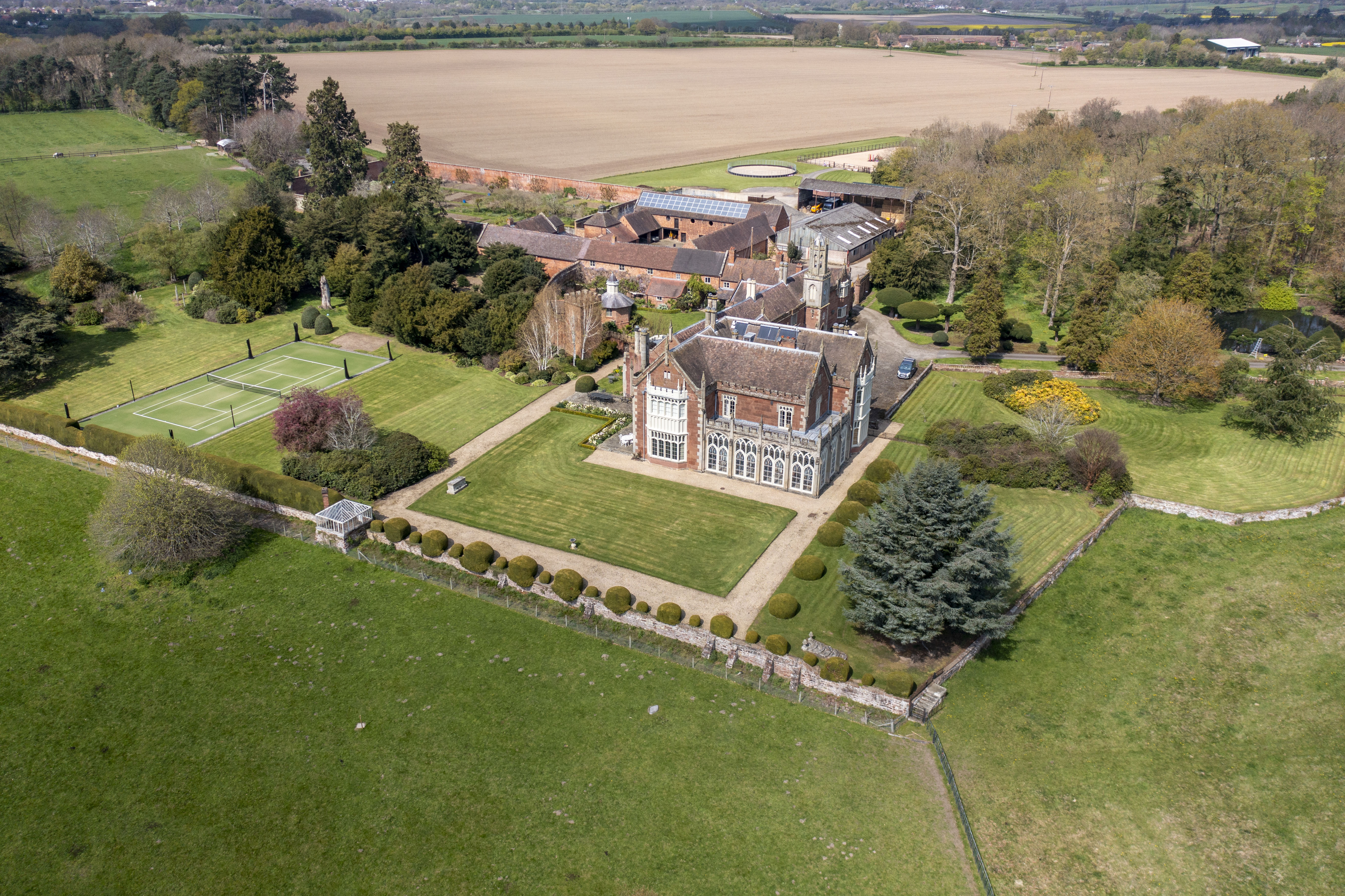
- Aerial view

- Location within Shropshire
- 52.6950°N 2.6987°W
- Location: Atcham, Shropshire

History
- Built: 1803
- Built for: Robert Burton

Site notes
- Architect: John Nash
- Architectural style: Tudor Gothic Revival
- Website: Official website

Listed Building – Grade I
- Official name: Longner Hall and short section of forecourt wall adjoining to north west
- Designated: 29 January 1952
- Reference no.: 1055105

National Register of Historic Parks and Gardens
- Official name: Longner Hall
- Designated: 1 December 1986
- Reference no.: 1001128

Longner Hall is a Grade I listed country house in Longner, Shropshire, England, some 2 miles (3 km) south-east of Shrewsbury in the civil parish of Atcham.

It is constructed of red sandstone ashlar in two storeys to an irregular L-shaped floor plan with a plain tile roof and stands in a 170-acre (70 hectare) landscaped park. The grade II listed chest tomb of an Edward Burton, refused burial at the then parish church of St Chad's, Shrewsbury, on his death in 1558, sits in the grounds.

The hall was built in the Tudor gothic style in 1803 on the site of an earlier house by architect John Nash for Robert Burton, who was High Sheriff of Shropshire for 1804–05. The Burton family had owned the land at Longner since mediaeval times. The gardens were landscaped at the same time by Humphry Repton. The estate was inherited in 1841 by banker Robert Burton, head of the banking firm of Burton, Lloyd, Salt, How and Co (otherwise known as the Salop Bank) and Mayor of Shrewsbury for a period in 1835 and again in 1843–44. He commissioned the Shrewsbury architect Edward Haycock to alter and extend the house and outbuildings in 1838.

As of 2016, the house is still privately owned by the Burton family, but guided tours are available on weekday afternoons, at 2 pm and 3.30 pm, from 30 May to 1 July, plus Easter Monday, Early May Bank Holiday and August Bank Holiday.

== See also ==
- Grade I listed buildings in Shropshire
- Listed buildings in Atcham
