= Anna Kingsford =

English physician and social reformer (1846–1888)

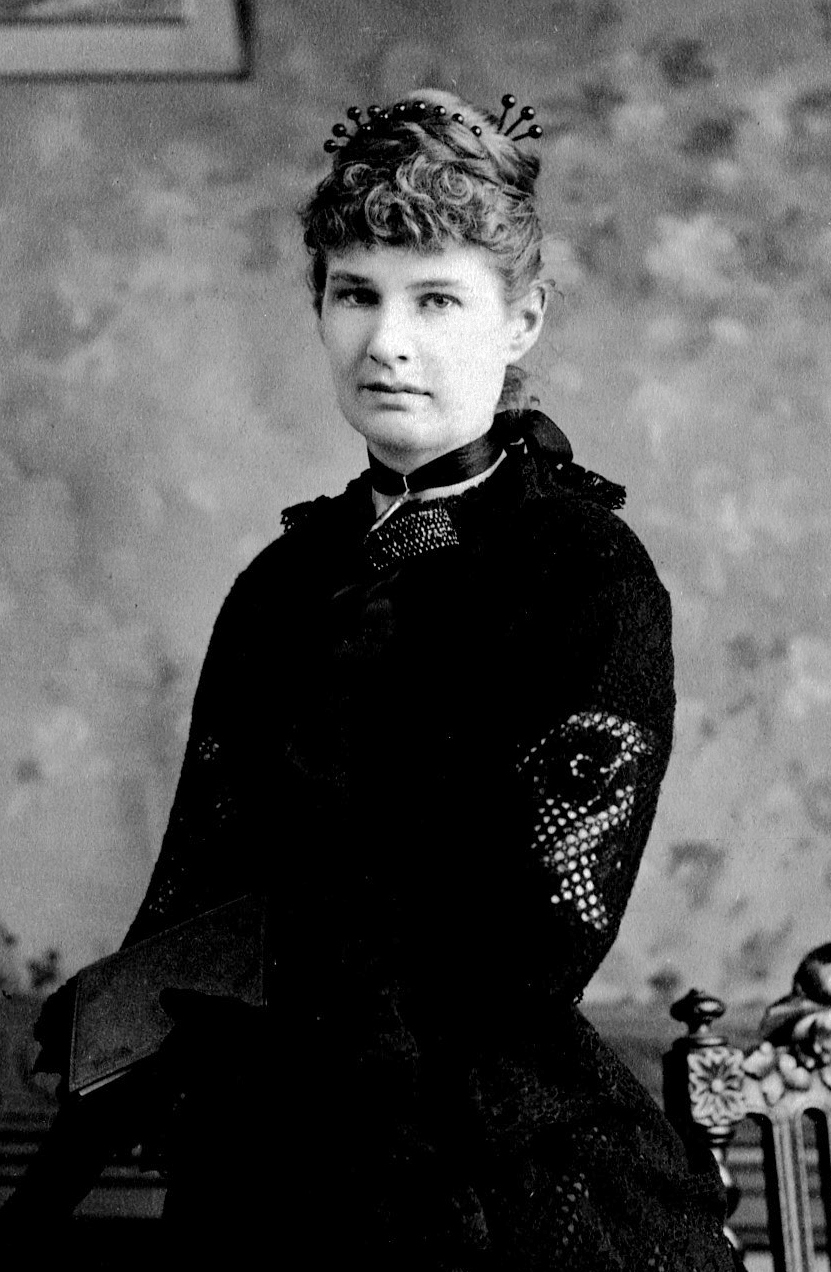
- Kingsford in the 1880s
- Born: Annie Bonus; 16 September 1846; Stratford, Essex (now London), England
- Died: 22 February 1888 (aged 41); London, England
- Resting place: Saint Eata's churchyard, Atcham
- Education: University of Paris (Medical degree)
- Occupations: Editor, The Lady's Own Paper
- Known for: Anti-vivisection, vegetarianism and women's rights activism
- Notable work: The Perfect Way in Diet (1881)
- Spouse: Algernon Godfrey Kingsford (m. 1867)
- Children: 1

Anna Kingsford (née Annie Bonus; 16 September 1846 – 22 February 1888) was an English anti-vivisectionist, Theosophist, a proponent of vegetarianism and a women's rights campaigner.

She was one of the first English women to obtain a degree in medicine, after Elizabeth Garrett Anderson, and the only medical student at the time to graduate without having experimented on a single animal. She pursued her degree in Paris, graduating in 1880 after six years of study, so that she could continue her animal advocacy from a position of authority. Her final thesis, L'Alimentation Végétale de l'Homme, was on the benefits of vegetarianism, published in English as The Perfect Way in Diet (1881). She founded the Food Reform Society that year, travelling within the UK to talk about vegetarianism, and to Paris, Geneva and Lausanne to speak out against animal experimentation.

Kingsford was interested in Buddhism and Gnosticism, and became active in the Theosophical movement in England, becoming president of the London Lodge of the Theosophical Society in 1883. In 1884 she founded the Hermetic Society, which lasted until 1887 when her health declined. She said she received insights in trance-like states and in her sleep; these were collected from her manuscripts and pamphlets by her lifelong collaborator Edward Maitland, and published posthumously in the book, Clothed with the Sun (1889). Subject to ill-health all her life, she died of lung disease at the age of 41, brought on by a bout of pneumonia. Her writing was virtually unknown for over 100 years after Maitland published her biography, The Life of Anna Kingsford (1896), though Helen Rappaport wrote in 2001 that her life and work are once again being studied.

== Early life ==
Kingsford was born Annie Bonus on 16 September 1846 in Maryland Point, Stratford, to Elizabeth Ann Schröder and John Bonus, a wealthy merchant. She was the youngest of seven children, with siblings Elizabeth, John, Henry, Albert, Edward, Joseph, and Charles William.

A precocious child, she wrote her first poem at the age of nine and, at thirteen, completed a longer work, Beatrice: a Tale of the Early Christians.

Accounts of her early life also describe experiences that later informed her spiritual outlook. Edward Maitland described her as a "born seer", attributing to her the ability to perceive apparitions and to intuit character and fortune, which she learned to keep private. She also took part in foxhunting, but is said to have abandoned it after experiencing a vision of herself as the fox.

By the late 1860s, Kingsford had begun to articulate her views on women's position in society. In an 1868 essay advocating female equality, she adopted the pseudonym "Ninon", invoking Ninon de l'Enclos, noted for her wit, independence, and intellectual reputation. In a letter of August 1873, also signed "Ninon", she explained: "much, you know is permitted to men which to women is forbidden. For this reason I usually write under some assumed name."

She contributed articles to Penny Post between 1868 and 1873. Supported by an annual income of £700 from her father, she purchased The Lady's Own Paper in 1872 and became its editor, a role that brought her into contact with prominent reformers, including the writer and anti-vivisectionist Frances Power Cobbe. An article by Cobbe on vivisection, published in the paper, prompted Kingsford's enduring interest in the subject.

== Marriage ==
Kingsford married her cousin, Algernon Godfrey Kingsford, on 31 December 1867, at the age of 21, shortly after reaching her legal majority. The match had previously been opposed by her family, who considered Algernon unsuitable due to his limited financial prospects and the social stigma surrounding his father's suicide. The fact that he was also her cousin, while legally permitted in Victorian England, attracted additional social scrutiny.

The timing of the marriage is significant. By waiting until she had reached legal adulthood, Kingsford was able to proceed without parental control and to negotiate the terms of the union herself. Before the marriage, Algernon agreed that she would retain personal autonomy and be free to pursue intellectual and professional work. These terms were supported by her independent income, inherited from her father, which remained legally her own and outside her husband's control. This financial independence gave her a degree of freedom that was unusual for women of her time.

The couple settled in Lichfield, where Algernon was preparing for Anglican orders. In 1868, Kingsford gave birth to their only child, a daughter, Eadith. The pregnancy was difficult, and her health declined afterward. Within the household, responsibilities developed in ways that diverged from prevailing Victorian norms: Algernon assumed responsibility for managing the household and its staff, while Kingsford increasingly directed her efforts toward writing, reform work, and later medical study.

The conjugal aspect of the marriage appears to have been limited. According to later accounts, particularly those of Edward Maitland, the couple came to live as brother and sister.

Taken together, these elements indicate that the marriage functioned less as a conventional domestic partnership and more as a structured arrangement that supported Kingsford's work. Her independent financial position, combined with agreed terms and a reconfiguration of household roles, enabled her to pursue a public and professional life that would otherwise have been difficult within the constraints of Victorian society. She converted to Roman Catholicism in 1870, despite her husband's position as an Anglican clergyman.

== Studies and research ==
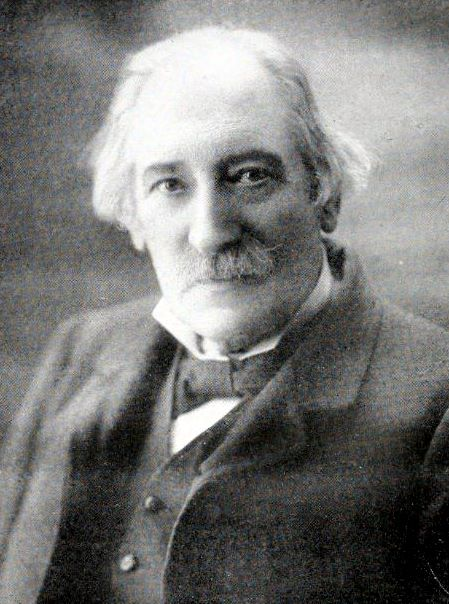
Edward Maitland, Kingsford's collaborator and biographer

In 1873, Kingsford met the writer Edward Maitland, a widower, who shared her rejection of materialism. With the blessing of Kingsford's husband, the two began to collaborate, Maitland accompanying her to Paris when she decided to study medicine. Paris was at that time the center of a revolution in the study of physiology, much of it as a result of experiments on animals, particularly dogs, and mostly conducted without anaesthetic. Claude Bernard (1813–1878), described as the "father of physiology", was working there, and famously said that "the physiologist is not an ordinary man: he is a scientist, possessed and absorbed by the scientific idea he pursues. He does not hear the cries of the animals, he does not see their flowing blood, he sees nothing but his idea ..."

Walter Gratzer, professor emeritus of biochemistry at King's College London, writes that significant opposition to vivisection emerged in Victorian England, in part in revulsion at the research being conducted in France. Bernard and other well-known physiologists, such as Charles Richet in France and Michael Foster in England, were strongly criticized for their work. British anti-vivisectionists infiltrated the lectures in Paris of François Magendie, Bernard's teacher, who dissected dogs without anaesthesia, allegedly shouting at them—"Tais-toi, pauvre bête!" (Shut up, you poor beast!) — while he worked. Bernard's wife, Marie-Francoise Bernard, was violently opposed to his research, though she was financing it through her dowry. In the end, she divorced him and set up an anti-vivisection society. This was the atmosphere in the faculty of medicine and the teaching hospitals in Paris when Kingsford arrived, shouldering the additional burden of being a woman. Although women were allowed to study medicine in France, Rudacille writes that they were not welcomed. Kingsford wrote to her husband in 1874:

Things are not going well for me. My chef at the Charité strongly disapproves of women students and took this means of showing it. About a hundred men (no women except myself) went round the wards today, and when we were all assembled before him to have our names written down, he called and named all the students except me, and then closed the book. I stood forward upon this, and said quietly, "Et moi aussi, monsieur." [And me, Sir.] He turned on me sharply, and cried, "Vous, vous n'êtes ni homme ni femme; je ne veux pas inscrire votre nom." [You, you are neither man nor woman; I don't want to write your name.] I stood silent in the midst of a dead silence."

Kingsford was distraught over the sights and sounds of the animal experiments she saw. She wrote on 20 August 1879:

I have found my Hell here in the Faculté de Médecine of Paris, a Hell more real and awful than any I have yet met with elsewhere, and one that fulfills all the dreams of the mediaeval monks. The idea that it was so came strongly upon me one day when I was sitting in the Musée of the school, with my head in my hands, trying vainly to shut out of my ears the piteous shrieks and cries which floated incessantly towards me up the private staircase ... Every now and then, as a scream more heart-rending than the rest reached me, the moisture burst out on my forehead and on the palms of my hands, and I prayed, "Oh God, take me out of this Hell; do not suffer me to remain in this awful place."

Kingsford adopted a vegetarian diet on the advice of her brother John Bonus. She was a vice-president of the Vegetarian Society.

== Death ==
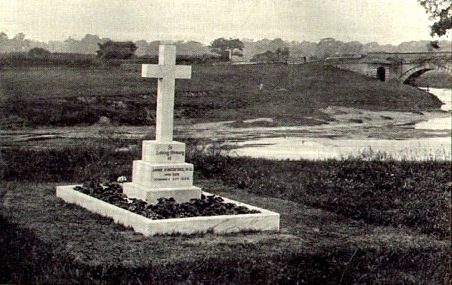
Kingsford's grave in Atcham, photographed c. 1896

Alan Pert, one of her biographers, wrote that Kingsford was caught in torrential rain in Paris in November 1886 on her way to the laboratory of Louis Pasteur, one of the most prominent vivisectionists of the period. She reportedly spent hours in wet clothing and developed pneumonia, then pulmonary tuberculosis. She travelled to the Riviera and Italy, sometimes with Maitland, at other times with her husband, hoping in vain that a different climate would help her recover. In July 1887, she settled in London in a house she and her husband rented at 15 Wynnstay Gardens, Kensington, and waited to die, although she remained mentally active.

She died on 22 February 1888, aged 41, and was buried in the churchyard of Saint Eata's, an 11th-century church in Atcham by the River Severn, her husband's church. Her name at death is recorded as Annie Kingsford. On her marriage in Sussex in 1867, her name was given as Annie Bonus.

== Works ==
=== Animal welfare and anti-vivisection ===
Kingsford's writings on animal ethics address vivisection, vegetarianism, and the moral status of non-human life.

- Kingsford, A. and Maitland, E. Addresses and Essays on Vegetarianism (1912), ethical vegetarian advocacy
- The Uselessness of Vivisection (1882), anti-vivisection argument
- Unscientific Science - Moral Aspects of Vivisection (1890), ethical critique of experimentation

=== Feminism and social reform ===
Kingsford's work in this area reflects her engagement with women's political rights and broader social reform movements.

- "An Essay on the Admission of Women to the Parliamentary Franchise" (1868), women's suffrage argument

=== Fiction and literary works ===
Her early and literary writings include poetry and prose fiction, often incorporating religious and symbolic themes.

- Beatrice; A Tale of the Early Christians (1863), early Christian historical fiction
- Dreams and Dream Stories (1888), visionary narratives and dream accounts
- River Reeds (1866), poetry collection
- Rosamunda the Princess, and Other Tales (1875), short fiction collection

=== Health, diet, and the body ===
These works address bodily health, hygiene, and dietary practice, often in relation to ethical and spiritual concerns.

- Health, Beauty and the Toilet: Letters to Ladies from a Lady Doctor (1886), women's health and hygiene guidance
- The Perfect Way in Diet (1881), vegetarianism and ethical diet

=== Religion and esoteric Christianity ===
Kingsford's theological writings explore mysticism, symbolism, and alternative interpretations of Christian doctrine.

- Astrology Theologised (1886), astrology and Christian mysticism
- Clothed with the Sun (1912), visionary spiritual theology
- The Credo of Christendom and Other Addresses and Essays on Esoteric Christianity (1916), esoteric Christian essays
- Kingsford, A. and Maitland, E. The Key of the Creeds (1875), comparative religious interpretation
- The Perfect Way, or the Finding of Christ (1909), mystical Christian doctrine

=== Shorter works (articles and contributions) ===
These shorter works include periodical writing and contributions to edited volumes.

- A Cast for a Fortune - The Holiday Adventures of a Lady Doctor (1877), travel narrative in periodical press
- The City of Blood (2003), symbolic and visionary prose

== See also ==
- Brown Dog affair
- Ecofeminism
- Hermetic Order of the Golden Dawn
- Isabelle de Steiger
- List of animal rights advocates
- Louise Lind-af-Hageby
- Theosophy and Christianity

== Bibliography ==
- Archbold, William Arthur Jobson (1900). “Kingsford, Anna,” Dictionary of National Biography, 1885-1900, vol. 31, pp. 174–175.
- Rudacille, Deborah (2000). The Scalpel and the Butterfly. University of California Press. ISBN 0520231546.
- Williamson, Lori (23 September 2004). “Kingsford [née Bonus], Anna [Annie] (1846–1888),” Oxford Dictionary of National Biography. (Subscription or UK public library membership required.)
