= Cronkhill =

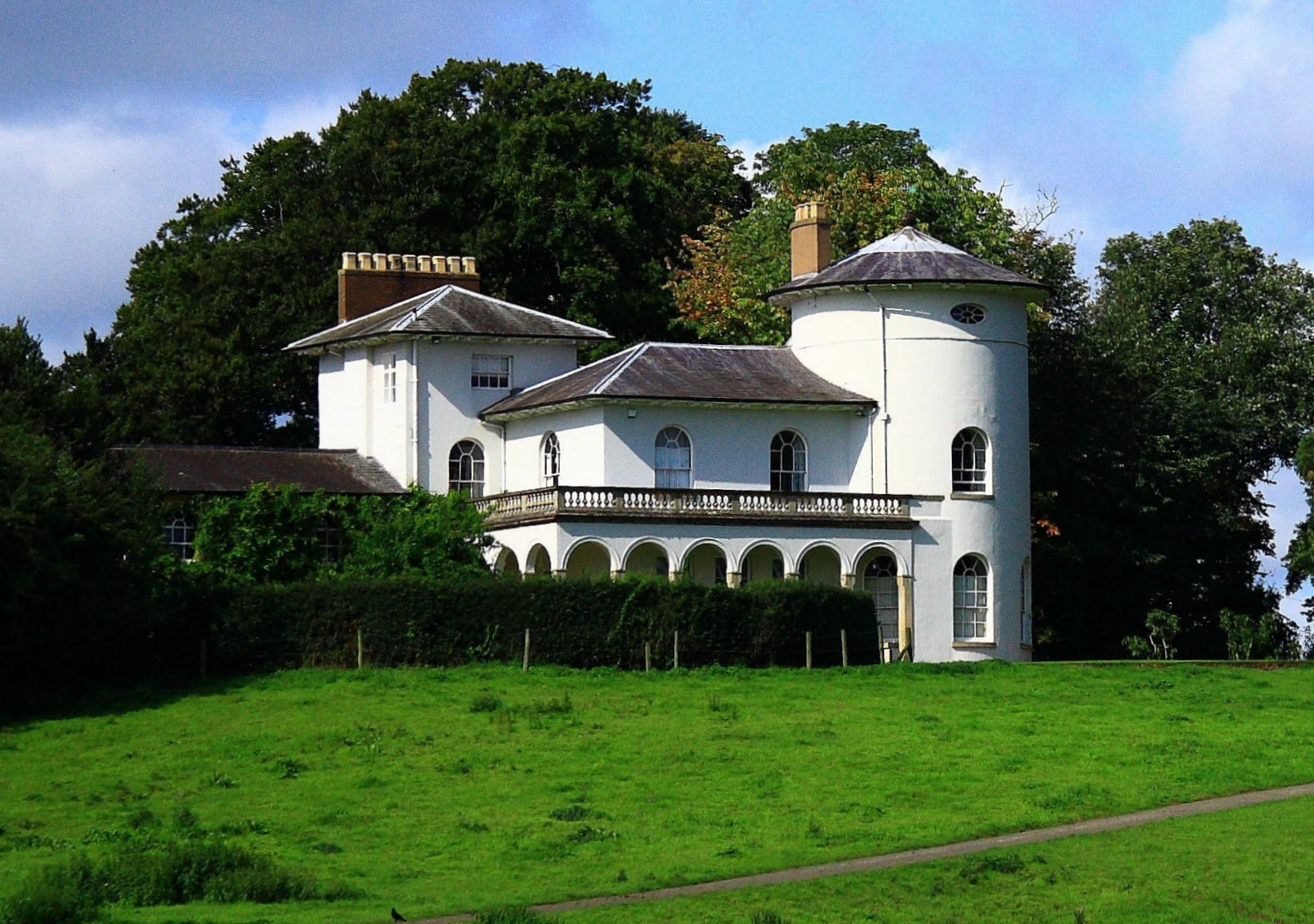
- Cronkhill
- Interactive map of the Cronkhill area

General information
- Type: Country house
- Architectural style: Italianate
- Location: Atcham, England
- Coordinates: 52.6703°N 2.6879°W
- Construction started: 1802

Design and construction
- Architect: John Nash
- Designations: Grade I

Cronkhill, Atcham, Shropshire, designed by John Nash, is "the earliest Italianate villa in England".

Drawing on influences from the Italian Campagna and the Picturesque, including the art of Claude Lorrain, it began an architectural style that was hugely influential in England in the first half of the nineteenth century. Major examples include Trentham Park and Osborne House. Nash's "most original building", it is Grade I listed.

== History ==
The house was designed by John Nash in 1802 for Francis Walford. Walford was a friend of Thomas Noel Hill, 2nd Baron Berwick, of nearby Attingham Park, and the agent for Berwick's Attingham estates. Michael Mansbridge considers that the design was "almost certainly inspired" by Claude Lorrain's painting "Landscape near Rome with a View of the Ponte Molle". Lord Berwick was the owner of two Claude landscapes. Walford lived at Cronkhill, managing Lord Berwick's Attingham interests, until their relationship ended acrimoniously in 1828, when Walford left the house. It was then occupied by members of the Berwick family, often when Attingham Park was let, until their final return to Attingham in the 1920s. Cronkhill, along with Attingham Park, was gifted to the National Trust in the post-war period. As a tenanted property, it is only open to the public on a limited number of days each year.

== Architecture ==
The body of the house is a rectangular two-storey block, with a circular, three-storey, tower to the north and a square, three-storey, tower to the west. A loggia links the two towers. The walls are now white stucco, although the colour may originally have been designed to imitate ashlar. Internally, the main reception rooms are simply decorated, comprising a drawing room in the round tower, a library in the square tower and a dining room in the body of the house. Although influential, the house, as with much of Nash's work, was subject to criticism, Davis describing the round tower as "merely a dramatic architectural trick, (containing neither) a circular staircase, nor even one circular room". In 2016, the National Trust undertook a major restoration of the house to "restore Cronkhill's appearance back to Nash's original design."

== See also ==
- Grade I listed buildings in Shropshire
- Listed buildings in Atcham
