= St Eata's Church, Atcham =

Coordinates: 52.6785°N 2.6804°W

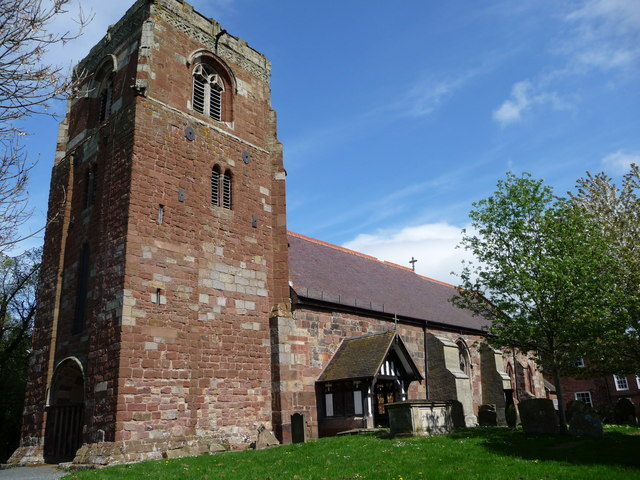
- St Eata's Church, Atcham, from the southwest

- Location in Shropshire
- OS grid reference: SJ 541 092
- Location: Atcham, Shropshire
- Country: England
- Denomination: Anglican
- Website: www.steatas.com

History
- Status: Parish church
- Dedication: Saint Eata

Architecture
- Functional status: Active
- Heritage designation: Grade I
- Designated: 13 June 1958
- Architectural type: Church
- Style: Norman, Gothic

Specifications
- Materials: Sandstone, tiled roofs

Administration
- Province: Canterbury
- Diocese: Lichfield
- Archdeaconry: Salop
- Deanery: Shrewsbury
- Parish: Atcham

Clergy
- Rector: The Rev'd Andrew Knight

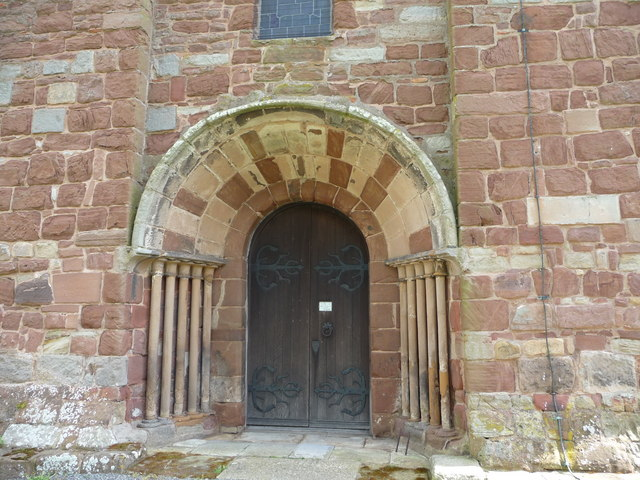
Norman doorway in the tower

St Eata's Church is in the village of Atcham, Shropshire, England. It is an active Anglican parish church in the deanery of Shrewsbury, the archdeaconry of Salop, and the diocese of Lichfield. Its benefice is united with that of St Giles-with-Sutton, Shrewsbury. The church is recorded in the National Heritage List for England as a designated Grade I listed building. Its dedication to Eata of Hexham is unique.

== History ==
The first church to St Eata is said to have been built in the eighth century but there is no longer any trace of this. A church was present on the site by 1075, the chronicler Orderic Vitalis being baptised there on the Easter Day of that year. The oldest part of the present church is in the nave and dates from the late Saxon or the early Norman era. The tower is probably from the 12th century, and the chancel from the late 13th century. The south porch is dated 1665. The church was restored in the late 19th century.

== Architecture ==
=== Exterior ===
The church is constructed in red and grey sandstone, and incorporates some large blocks of stone from the Roman city of Wroxeter. The roof is tiled. The plan of the church consists of a nave, a chancel, a south porch, and a west tower. The tower is in four stages, with buttresses. At the top of the tower is a quatrefoil frieze, corner gargoyles, a parapet with truncated pinnacles, and a small pyramidal cap. The bell openings are louvred, with a clock face over the opening on the north side. In the third stage are paired lancet windows, and the second stage contains a large lancet window on the west side. The bottom stage has a round-arched west doorway with five orders of shafts. In the north wall of the nave is an early, small, round-headed window; the other windows in the nave are Perpendicular in style. The chancel has an east window consisting of three stepped lancets under one arch. The windows on the north and south sides of the chancel contain Y-tracery.

=== Interior ===
In the south wall of the chancel is a tomb recess. The octagonal font is dated 1675, and the reading desk contains 17th-century panels depicting the Parable of the Prodigal Son. The choir stalls incorporate late medieval poppyheads and 17th-century reliefs. The stained glass in the east window dates from the 15th century, and there is 16th-century glass in a north nave window depicting Blanche Parry. In the north wall of the chancel is a window dated 1859 by William Wailes, and there are windows in the south walls of the chancel and the nave by Lavers and Westlake. The oldest monument dates from 1524. The two-manual pipe organ was built in 1858 by G. M. Holdich, restored in 1896 by Nicholson and Company, and overhauled in 1961 by Hawkins and Company. More pipes were added in 1976. Near the organ are two brass parish war memorial plaques, one listing nine men who died serving in World War I, the other two men who died in World War II. There is a ring of six bells, four of which were cast in 1709 by Abraham Rudhall I at Gloucester, and two in 1829 by Thomas Mears II at the Whitechapel Bell Foundry. A bellringing gallery, with mezzanine floor accessed by spiral stairway, was installed in 2014; it replaces the previous gallery that was badly damaged in a fire caused by a lightning strike in 1879 (which injured several children) and taken down in 1896.

== External features ==
In the churchyard to the south of the church are six structures that have been designated as Grade II listed buildings. The sundial probably dates from the 18th century. The Lawrence Memorial is dated 1789, the Howells Memorial dates from the early 19th century, and the Walford Memorial is dated 1814. There is a group of five coffin slabs probably dating from the 14th century, and a group of five chest tombs from the late 18th or early 19th century. There is an unlisted family vault for Noel Hill, 1st Baron Berwick and his descendants down to 1903.

Anna Bonus Kingsford, feminist writer and wife of a then vicar of Atcham, is buried in the churchyard, which also contains five Commonwealth war graves of airmen of the Second World War - two Britons, an Australian, a Canadian and a New Zealander.

== See also ==
- Grade I listed churches in Shropshire
- Listed buildings in Atcham
