= Internal environment =

Biological term for the interstitial fluid of multicellular organisms

The internal environment (or milieu intérieur in French; French pronunciation: [mi.ljø ɛ̃.te.ʁjœʁ]) was a concept developed by Claude Bernard, a French physiologist in the 19th century, to describe the interstitial fluid and its physiological capacity to ensure protective stability for the tissues and organs of multicellular organisms.

== Etymology ==
Claude Bernard used the French phrase milieu intérieur (internal environment in English) in several works from 1854 until his death in 1878. He most likely adopted it from the histologist Charles Robin, who had employed the phrase "milieu de l’intérieur" as a synonym for the ancient hippocratic idea of humors. Bernard was initially only concerned with the role of the blood but he later included that of the whole body in ensuring this internal stability. He summed up his idea as follows:

The fixity of the milieu supposes a perfection of the organism such that the external variations are at each instant compensated for and equilibrated.... All of the vital mechanisms, however varied they may be, have always one goal, to maintain the uniformity of the conditions of life in the internal environment.... The stability of the internal environment is the condition for the free and independent life.

Bernard's work regarding the internal environment of regulation was supported by work in Germany at the same time. While Rudolf Virchow placed the focus on the cell, others, such as Carl von Rokitansky (1804–1878) continued to study humoral pathology particularly the matter of microcirculation. Von Rokitansky suggested that illness originated in damage to this vital microcirculation or internal system of communication. Hans Eppinger (1879–1946), a professor of internal medicine in Vienna, further developed von Rokitansky's point of view and showed that every cell requires a suitable environment which he called the ground substance for successful microcirculation. This work of German scientists was continued in the 20th century by Alfred Pischinger (1899–1982) who defined the connections between the ground substance or extracellular matrix and both the hormonal and autonomic nervous systems and saw therein a complex system of regulation for the body as a whole and for cellular functioning, which he termed the ground regulatory (das System der Grundregulation).

== History ==
Bernard created his concept to replace the ancient idea of life forces with that of a mechanistic process in which the body's physiology was regulated through multiple mechanical equilibrium adjustment feedbacks. Walter Cannon's later notion of homeostasis (while also mechanistic) lacked this concern, and was even advocated in the context of such ancient notions as vis medicatrix naturae.

Cannon, in contrast to Bernard, saw the self-regulation of the body as a requirement for the evolutionary emergence and exercise of intelligence, and further placed the idea in a political context: "What corresponds in a nation to the internal environment of the body? The closest analogue appears to be the whole intricate system of production and distribution of merchandise". He suggested, as an analogy to the body's own ability to ensure internal stability, that society should preserve itself with a technocratic bureaucracy, "biocracy".

The idea of milieu intérieur, it has been noted, led Norbert Wiener to the notion of cybernetics and negative feedback creating self-regulation in the nervous system and in nonliving machines, and that "today, cybernetics, a formalization of Bernard's constancy hypothesis, is viewed as one of the critical antecedents of contemporary cognitive science".

=== Early reception ===
Bernard's idea was initially ignored in the 19th century. This happened in spite of Bernard being highly honored as the founder of modern physiology (he indeed received the first French state funeral for a scientist). Even the 1911 edition of Encyclopædia Britannica does not mention it. His ideas about milieu intérieur only became central to the understanding of physiology in the early part of the 20th century. It was only with Joseph Barcroft, Lawrence J. Henderson, and particularly Walter Cannon and his idea of homeostasis, that it received its present recognition and status. The current 15th edition notes it as being Bernard's most important idea.

=== Idea of internal communication ===
In addition to providing the basis for understanding the internal physiology in terms of the interdependence of the cellular and extracellular matrix or ground system, Bernard's fruitful concept of the milieu intérieur has also led to significant research regarding the system of communication that allows for the complex dynamics of homeostasis.

==== Work by Szent-Györgyi ====
Initial work was conducted by Albert Szent-Györgyi who concluded that organic communication could not be explained solely by the random collisions of molecules and studied energy fields as well as the connective tissue. He was aware of earlier work by Moglich and Schon (1938) and Jordan (1938) on non-electrolytic mechanisms of charge transfer in living systems. This was further explored and advanced by Szent-Györgyi in 1941 in a Koranyi Memorical Lecture in Budapest, published in both Science and Nature, wherein he proposed that proteins are semi-conductors and capable of rapid transfer of free electrons within an organism. This idea was received with skepticism, but it is now generally accepted that most if not all parts of the extracellular matrix have semiconductor properties. The Koranyi Lecture triggered a growing molecular-electronics industry, using biomolecular semiconductors in nanoelectronic circuits.

In 1988 Szent-Györgyi stated that "Molecules do not have to touch each other to interact. Energy can flow through... the electromagnetic field" which "along with water, forms the matrix of life." This water is related also to the surfaces of proteins, DNA and all living molecules in the matrix. This is a structured water that provides stability for metabolic functioning, and related to collagen as well, the major protein in the extracellular matrix and in DNA. The structured water can form channels of energy flow for protons (unlike electrons that flow through the protein structure to create bio-electricity). Mitchell (1976) refers to these flow as 'proticity'.

==== Work in Germany ====
Work in Germany over the last half-century has also focused on the internal communication system, in particular as it relates to the ground system. This work has led to their characterization of the ground system or extracellular matrix interaction with the cellular system as a 'ground regulatory system', seeing therein the key to homeostasis, a body-wide communication and support system, vital to all functions.

In 1953 a German doctor and scientist, Reinhold Voll, discovered that points used in acupuncture had different electrical properties from the surrounding skin, namely a lower resistance. Voll further discovered that the measurement of the resistances at the points gave valuable indications as to the state of the internal organs. Further research was done by Dr. Alfred Pischinger, the originator of the concept of the 'system of ground regulation', as well as Drs. Helmut Schimmel, and Hartmut Heine, using Voll's method of electro-dermal screening. This further research revealed that the gene is not so much the controller but the repository of blueprints on how cells and higher systems should operate, and that the actual regulation of biological activities (see Epigenetic cellular biology) lies in a 'system of ground regulation'. This system is built on the ground substance, a complex connective tissue between all the cells, often also called the extra-cellular matrix. This ground substance is made up of 'amorphous' and 'structural' ground substance. The former is "a transparent, half-fluid gel produced and sustained by the fibroblast cells of the connective tissues" consisting of highly polymerized sugar-protein complexes.

The ground substance, according to German research, determines what enters and exits the cell and maintains homeostasis, which requires a rapid communication system to respond to complex signals (see also Bruce Lipton).

This is made possible by the diversity of molecular structures of the sugar polymers of the ground substance, the ability to swiftly generate new such substances, and their high interconnectedness. This creates a redundance that makes possible the controlled oscillation of values above and below the dynamic homeostasis present in all living creatures. This is a kind of fast-responding, "short term memory" of the ground substance. Without this labile capacity, the system would quickly move to an energetic equilibrium, which would bring inactivity and death.

For its biochemical survival, every organism requires the ability to rapidly construct, destroy and reconstruct the constituents of the ground substance.

Between the molecules that make up the ground substance there are minimal surfaces of potential energy. The charging and discharging of the materials of the ground substance cause 'biofield oscillations' (photon fields). The interference of these fields creates short lived (from 10–9 to up to 10–5 seconds) tunnels through the ground substance. Through these tunnels, shaped like the hole through a donut, large chemicals may traverse from capillaries through the ground substance and into the functional cells of organs and back again. All metabolic processes depend upon this transport mechanism.

Major ordering energy structures in the body are created by the ground substance, such as collagen, which not only conducts energy but generates it, due to its piezoelectric properties.

Like quartz crystal, collagen in the ground substance and the more stable connective tissues (fascia, tendons, bones, etc.). transforms mechanical energy (pressure, torsion, stretch) into electromagnetic energy, which then resonates through the ground substance (Athenstaedt, 1974). However, if the ground substance is chemically imbalanced, the energy resonating through the body loses coherence.

This is what occurs in the adaptation response described by Hans Selye. When the ground regulation is out of balance, the probability of chronic illness increases. Research by Heine indicates that unresolved emotional traumas release a neurotransmitter substance P which causes the collagen to take on a hexagonal structure that is more ordered than their usual structure, putting the ground substance out of balance, what he calls an "emotional scar "providing" an important scientific verification that diseases can have psychological causes." (see also Bruce Lipton)

==== Work in the U.S. ====
While the initial work on identifying the importance of the ground regulatory system was done in Germany, more recent work examining the implications of inter and intra-cellular communication via the extra-cellular matrix has taken place in the U.S. and elsewhere.

Structural continuity between extracellular, cyst skeletal and nuclear components was discussed by Hay, Berezny et al. and Oschman. Historically, these elements have been referred to as ground substances, and because of their continuity, they act to form a complex, interlaced system that reaches into and contacts every part of the body. Even as early as 1851 it was recognized that the nerve and blood systems do not directly connect to the cell, but are mediated by and through an extracellular matrix.

Recent research regarding the electrical charges of the various glycol-protein components of the extracellular matrix shows that because of the high density of negative charges on glycosaminoglycans (provided by sulfate and carboxylate groups of the uronic acid residues) the matrix is an extensive redox system capable of absorbing and donating electrons at any point. This electron transfer function reaches into the interiors of cells as the cytoplasmic matrix is also strongly negatively charged. The entire extracellular and cellular matrix functions as a biophysical storage system or accumulator for electrical charge.

From thermodynamic, energetic and geometrical considerations, molecules of the ground substance are considered to form minimal physical and electrical surfaces, such that, based on the mathematics of minimal surfaces, minuscule changes can lead to significant changes in distant areas of the ground substance. This discovery is seen as having implications for many physiological and biochemical processes, including membrane transport, antigen–antibody interactions, protein synthesis, oxidation reactions, actin–myosin interactions, sol to gel transformations in polysaccharides.

One description of the charge transfer process in the matrix is, "highly vectoral electron transport along biopolymer pathways". Other mechanisms involve clouds of negative charge created around the proteoglycans in the matrix. There are also soluble and mobile charge transfer complexes in cells and tissues (e.g. Slifkin, 1971; Gutman, 1978; Mattay, 1994).

Rudolph A. Marcus of the California Institute of Technology found that when the driving force increases beyond a certain level, electron transfer will begin to slow down instead of speed up (Marcus, 1999) and he received a Nobel Prize in chemistry in 1992 for this contribution to the theory of electron transfer reactions in chemical systems. The implication of the work is that a vectoral electron transport process may be greater the smaller the potential, as in living systems.
