= The Perfect Way in Diet =

1881 treatise by Anna Kingsford

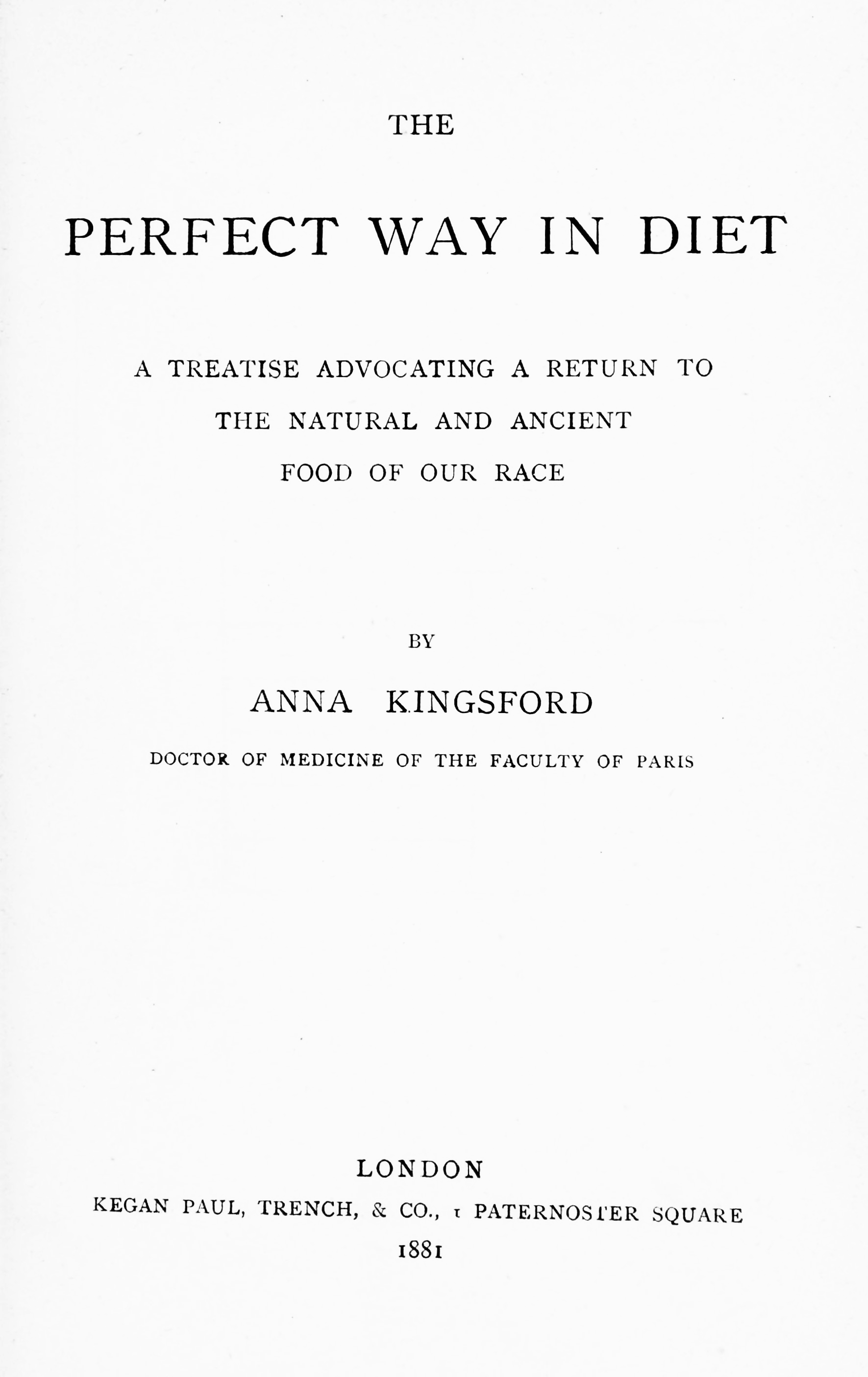
- First edition title page
- Author: Anna Kingsford
- Language: English
- Subject: Vegetarianism; Animal ethics
- Publisher: Kegan Paul, Trench, & Co.
- Publication date: 1881
- Publication place: United Kingdom of Great Britain and Ireland
- Media type: Print
- Pages: 121
- Text: The Perfect Way in Diet at the Internet Archive

The Perfect Way in Diet: A Treatise Advocating a Return to the Natural and Ancient Food of Our Race is an 1881 treatise on vegetarianism by the English physician and animal protection advocate Anna Kingsford. Published in London by Kegan Paul, Trench, & Co., it was a revised and expanded translation of her French medical thesis. Kingsford argues that humans are naturally suited to a vegetarian diet, drawing on anatomy, nutritional chemistry, historical examples and medical observations. She also examines the economic costs of meat production and the suffering of animals raised for food, connecting vegetarianism with moral and spiritual development. The book was promoted by the Vegetarian Society and appeared in several editions during the late 19th century.

== Background and publication ==
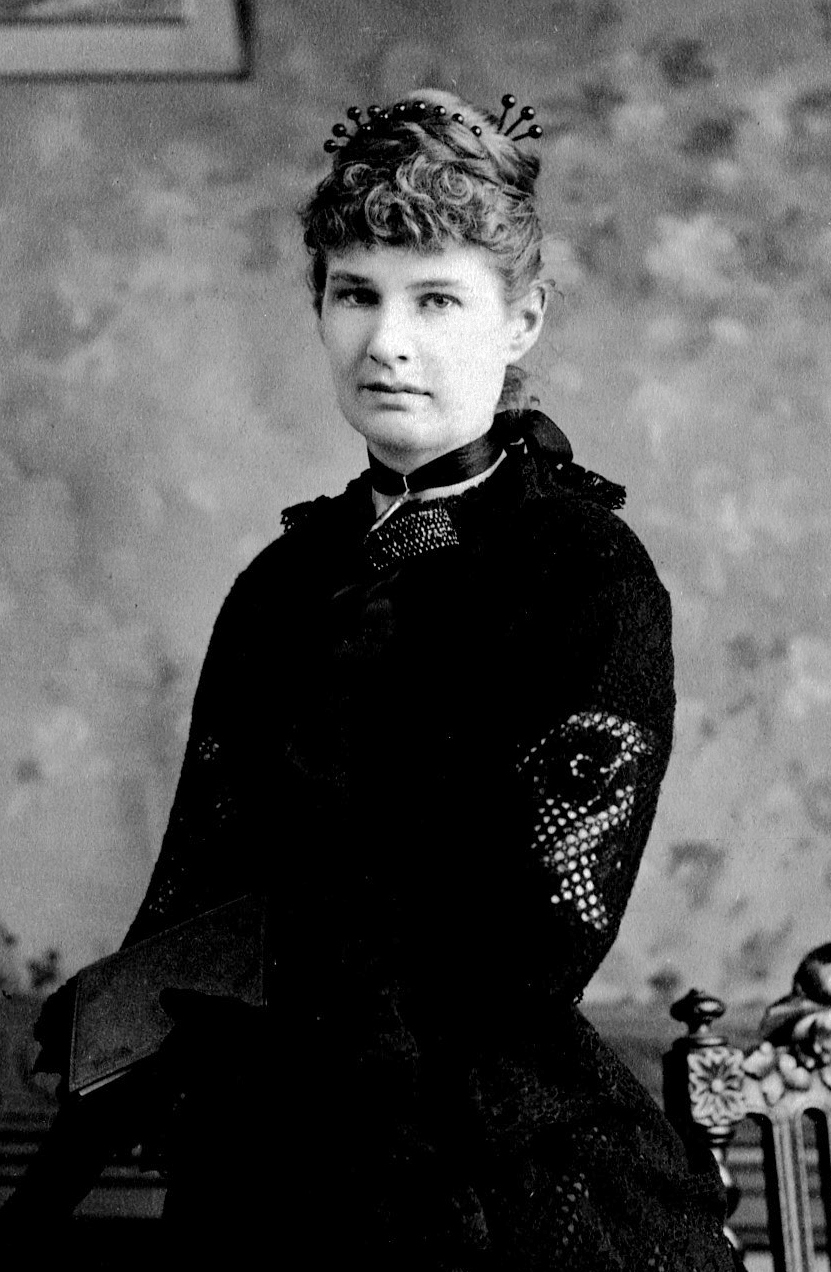
Anna Kingsford, c. 1880s

Anna Kingsford (1846–1888) was a vice-president of the Vegetarian Society and was active in the late Victorian vegetarian, anti-vivisection and spiritualist movements. According to literary scholar Natasha Rebry Coulthard, Kingsford credited her "vegetable and milk regimen" with preserving her health and helping her overcome difficulties during her medical studies.

The Perfect Way in Diet was based on Kingsford's medical thesis, De l'alimentation végétale chez l'homme, submitted to the Paris Faculty of Medicine in July 1880. In the preface, Kingsford describes the English work as a revised and enlarged translation of the thesis, which had already appeared in French and subsequently in German. According to historian Daniel Breeze, the thesis was initially rejected by the examiners because it included moral arguments; these passages were removed and later restored for the English publication.

The English edition was published in London in 1881 by Kegan Paul, Trench, & Co. and dedicated to the members of the Vegetarian Society. A fifth edition was published in 1892 by Kegan Paul, Trench, Trübner & Co. A sixth edition was advertised in the American periodical The Vegetarian in 1895.

Kingsford regarded the treatise as a precursor to her later esoteric work with Edward Maitland, The Perfect Way; or, The Finding of Christ (1882). In a letter reproduced by biographer Alan Pert, she described The Perfect Way in Diet as a "forerunner" of the later book, providing the physical foundation for its spiritual teachings.

== Contents ==
The Perfect Way in Diet advocates a return to what Kingsford considers the natural human diet, consisting primarily of fruits, grains and other vegetable foods. The book opens with an extract from Edwin Arnold's The Light of Asia, depicting the Buddha intervening to prevent an animal sacrifice. Kingsford subsequently develops her case for vegetarianism through physiological, medical, historical, economic and ethical arguments.

=== Physiology and nutrition ===
Kingsford rejects the view that meat-eating is natural or necessary for humans. Drawing on comparative anatomy, she compares human teeth, jaws and digestive organs with those of other mammals, particularly primates, and argues that humans are naturally frugivorous. She maintains that fruits and grains are better suited to human physiology than flesh.

The book examines the diets of different populations, citing accounts of agricultural labourers, soldiers and other physically active people who consumed little or no meat. Kingsford uses these examples to argue that physical strength and endurance do not depend on flesh-eating. She also compares the chemical composition and nutritional value of animal and vegetable foods, discussing proteins, fats and carbohydrates.

Although Kingsford presents plant foods as the ideal basis of human nutrition, she accepts the inclusion of milk, eggs, cream, butter and cheese in a vegetarian diet. She argues that these products are compatible with the dietary system she advocates and that their consumption does not, in itself, violate its moral principles.

=== Health and economics ===
Kingsford argues that meat has stimulating effects comparable to alcohol and associates its consumption with illness, excessive appetites and other habits she considers harmful. She discusses the possible relationship between diet and conditions including gout, digestive disorders and infectious diseases. The book also contains accounts of patients whose symptoms she reports as having improved after adopting vegetarian diets, alongside her own account of the health benefits she attributed to her dietary practices.

In discussing the economics of food production, Kingsford compares the costs of animal and vegetable foods and considers the amount of land required to sustain populations on different diets. She argues that growing crops for direct human consumption would provide food more economically and support a larger population than raising animals for meat.

=== Animal ethics and morality ===
The book condemns the suffering involved in raising, transporting and slaughtering animals for food. Kingsford criticises slaughterhouses and the occupation of butchery, arguing that killing animals for human consumption causes suffering to the animals and has harmful moral consequences for the people employed in the trade. She presents vegetarianism as a means of reducing this suffering and encouraging more compassionate relations between humans and other animals.

Kingsford also considers the treatment of animals beyond food production, discussing livestock breeding, the use of leather and fur, and hunting for sport. She questions the necessity of these practices and objects to the suffering and killing they involve.

In the concluding passages, Kingsford invokes figures including Pythagoras, Plutarch, Porphyry and Francis of Assisi as historical advocates of abstinence from flesh or compassion towards animals. The treatise closes with an extract from Ovid's account of Pythagoras condemning the killing and eating of animals.

Coulthard interprets Kingsford's vegetarian writing as treating diet as a means of shaping both individual character and social relations. She argues that Kingsford understood humans and nonhuman animals as materially and spiritually connected, although her writings also retained hierarchical assumptions about human superiority and moral progress.

== Reception and analysis ==
The book circulated within organised vegetarianism. It was listed for sale by the Vegetarian Society in The Dietetic Reformer and Vegetarian Messenger in November 1883. Coulthard notes that The Dietetic Reformer, the society's official publication, praised Kingsford's proposal for a vegetarian badge or symbol in September 1883 and promoted the book in October 1885 as fundamental to the vegetarian cause. She characterises the treatise as a Vegetarian Society "manifesto".

In her 2022 analysis, Coulthard situates The Perfect Way in Diet within late Victorian debates about human nutrition, evolution and the relationship between humans and other animals. She argues that Kingsford's conception of vegetarianism anticipated aspects of contemporary posthumanist dietary ethics by presenting food choice as a practice through which individuals could develop different relationships with animals and the environment. Coulthard also identifies tensions in Kingsford's thought between her recognition of human dependence on other species and her continued belief in human moral superiority.

== See also ==
- A Vindication of Natural Diet – 1813 pamphlet by Shelley
- Ethics of eating meat
- History of vegetarianism
- Vegetarianism and religion
- Women and vegetarianism and veganism advocacy
