= Listed buildings in Atcham =

Atcham is a civil parish in Shropshire, England. It contains 67 listed buildings that are recorded in the National Heritage List for England. Of these, four are listed at Grade I, the highest of the three grades, six at Grade II*, the middle grade, and the others are at Grade II, the lowest grade. The parish contains the village of Atcham and the surrounding countryside. In the parish are three country houses; each of these is listed at Grade I, and they are associated with a number of other listed buildings in the surrounding grounds. The other Grade I listed building is the parish church, and items in the churchyard are also listed. The Severn River runs through the parish and the older bridge crossing it is listed. Also listed is a bridge crossing a disused branch of the Shropshire Union Canal. The other listed buildings include houses and cottages in the village and countryside, farmhouses and farm buildings, two milestones, and a telephone kiosk.

== Key ==
Grade	Criteria
I	Buildings of exceptional interest, sometimes considered to be internationally important
II*	Particularly important buildings of more than special interest
II	Buildings of national importance and special interest

== Buildings ==
Name and location	Photograph	Date	Notes	Grade
St Eata's Church; 52.67854°N 2.68043°W		12th century	The earliest part of the church is the nave, the chancel dates from the late 13th century, the tower was added in about 1300 and later heightened, the porch dates from 1685, and the church was restored in the late 19th century. The church is built in sandstone, it incorporates large blocks of stone from the Roman city of Wroxeter, and the roof is tiled. It consists of a nave, a south porch, a chancel, and a west tower. The tower has four stages, buttresses, a quatrefoil frieze, gargoyles, a parapet with pinnacles, and a pyramidal cap with a weathervane. On the north wall of the nave is an early, small, round-headed window; the other windows in the nave are Perpendicular in style. The chancel has an east window consisting of three stepped lancets.	I
Group of five coffin slabs 52.67848°N 2.68055°W	—	14th century (probable)	The coffin slabs are in the churchyard of St Eata's Church, immediately to the south of the church. They are in grey sandstone, one has an incised Celtic cross and two others have raised crosses.	II
Home Farmhouse; 52.68675°N 2.67757°W	—	15th century	The core is a timber framed hall with cross-wings, which has been encased and extended in brick. It has a tiled roof, a plinth, two storeys, a central range of three bays and gabled wings. The doorway has a panelled architrave and a gabled latticed porch, and the windows are casements. There is a single storey lean-to on the right.	II
The Cottage; 52.67906°N 2.67924°W	—	15th or 16th century	The house was extended and remodelled in the 19th century. It is timber framed and contains cruck trusses. The house was extended in brick with quoins and an eaves cornice, and has a tile roof. There are two storeys, a main range of three bays, and a later rear wing. The windows are casements, and inside are remains of cruck framing.	II
Burton memorial 52.69483°N 2.69913°W	—	Mid 16th century	The memorial is in the grounds of Longner Hall, and is to the memory of Edward Burton who died in 1558 and was refused burial at the then parish church of St Chad in Shrewsbury. It consists of a chest tomb in grey sandstone and has a moulded plinth, a frieze, and a flat top. There is a long painted inscription on the north face and on a frieze that goes around the tomb.	II
Atcham Grange; 52.67733°N 2.68095°W	—	Late 16th or 17th century	A farmhouse, originally timber framed, later encased and extended in red brick, it has a dentil eaves cornice and a tile roof. Originally a hall with cross-wings, it was extended on both sides in the late 19th century. There are two storeys with attics, a canted bay window, and the other windows are casements.	II
No. 7, Atcham; 52.67935°N 2.67824°W	—	17th century	A pair of cottages, remodelled in the late 18th or early 19th century, and combined into one dwelling. It is timber framed with brick infill, rendered at the front, and has a thatched roof. There is one storey and an attic. In the ground floor are two doorways flanked by casement windows with ogee heads and containing Y-tracery, and above is a central eyebrow eaves dormer with diamond leading.	II
Chilton Grove; 52.67721°N 2.70068°W	—	1740	The house was refronted in Greek Revival style in the 1830s. It is in red brick, rendered at the front, on a plinth, with a moulded cornice, a coped parapet, and a tile roof. The house has an L-shaped plan, two and three storeys, and a front of seven bays, the end bays projecting slightly under pediments. The porch has pairs of unfluted Doric columns and an entablature. At right angles to the rear are two two0storey gabled wings.	II
Dovecote; 52.67726°N 2.70150°W	—	Mid 18th century	The dovecote is in the grounds of Chilton Grove. It is in red brick with a pyramidal tiled roof and a lead cap. The dovecote has a square plan, a doorway on the east side, and two blocked openings. Inside are 14 tiers of nesting boxes on each wall.	II
Sundial in churchyard 52.67839°N 2.68063°W	—	18th century	The sundial is in the churchyard of St Eata's Church. It is in sandstone and has a square plan, and a shaped baluster stem with a moulded base and cap. On the top is a copper dial plate and a pierced gnomon.	II
The Vicarage Cottage; 52.67839°N 2.67995°W		Mid 18th century	Originally part of the vicarage, later a separate dwelling, it was altered in the early 19th and 20th centuries. The house is in red brick with a tile roof and crowstepped gable ends. There are two storeys and an attic, and a front of four bays. The doorway has a segmental arch and a gabled porch, and the windows are sashes.	II
Emstrey Farmhouse; 52.68953°N 2.70192°W	—	1764	The farmhouse is in red brick with a dentil eaves cornice, and a tile roof with parapeted gables. It has two storeys and an attic, a front range of three bays, a single-storey extension at the left, and a two-storey rear wing. The door has a radial fanlight, a hood on fluted brackets, and a glazed porch. The windows are casements with segmental heads, and in the attic are three gabled dormers.	II
Atcham Bridge; 52.67953°N 2.68091°W		1769–71	A former road bridge over the River Severn, designed by John Gwynn, it is in sandstone. The bridge has a hump back and seven arches that have rusticated soffits, voussoirs, and triple keystones. The piers have cutwaters, and the bridge has a coped parapet with central pediments and datestones. At the ends are piers with pyramidal caps.	II*
Mytton and Mermaid Hotel; 52.67925°N 2.67981°W		c. 1775	The hotel is in red brick with a dentil eaves cornice and a hipped tile roof. There are three storeys with a basement, and a north front of seven bays. The doorway has Doric pilasters, an entablature with a dentil cornice, and a triangular pediment with a statue above. Over the door is a rectangular fanlight, and the windows are sashes. The west front has six bays and contains a three-bay bow window.	II
Barn, Atcham Grange; 52.67720°N 2.67979°W	—	Late 18th century	The barn is in red brick with a dentil eaves cornice and a tile roof, and has ten bays. It contains opposing cart entrances, round-arched blind arcading, openings with segmental heads, and vents in lozenge shapes.	II
Ice house 52.68490°N 2.66521°W	—	Late 18th century (probable)	The ice house is in the grounds of Attingham Park. It consists of a red brick dome covered in earth. There are two circular lights, and an L-shaped barrel vaulted tunnel with steps leading down to a doorway. Inside there is a barrel vaulted passage and a domed chamber.	II
Railings and retaining wall, Tern Bridge; 52.67969°N 2.66433°W	—	Late 18th century (probable)	The retaining wall to the west of the bridge is in red brick with grey sandstone coping, and it stretches for about 100 metres (330 ft). On the wall are wrought iron railings with spear heads and moulded bases.	II
Tern Bridge; 52.67964°N 2.66338°W		1777–80	The bridge carries the B5061 road over the River Tern, and was widened in 1932. It is built in grey sandstone, and consists of a single segmental arch with rusticated voussoirs and a central tripled fluted keystone with a carved face. The bridge has a frieze, a cornice, and a balustraded parapet. At each end is an arched niche flanked by paired rusticated Tuscan half-columns, and beyond these are carved retaining walls with square end piers and buttresses.	II*
Estate bridge 52.68489°N 2.66481°W		1780	The bridge crosses the River Tern in the grounds of Attingham Park. It is in grey sandstone, and consists of a single round arch. The bridge has a raised architrave with a projecting keystone, a string course, and a solid coped parapet. There are flanking square piers, and retaining walls curving out to square end-piers with chamfered caps.	II*
Attingham Park; 52.68498°N 2.66714°W		1783–85	A country house built for Noel Hill, with internal alterations in 1805–07 by John Nash. It is built in Grinshill sandstone with some red brick, and has hipped slate roofs. There is a central U-shaped block with set-back curving wings linking to pavilions. The main block has three storeys and a basement, a front of eleven bays, and six bays on the sides. In the centre is a portico with four unfluted Ionic columns, an entablature with a triangular pediment. The wings have twelve-bay colonnades, and the pavilions have two storeys and four bays.	I
Courtyard and gatehouse, Attingham Park; 52.68557°N 2.66754°W		1783–85	The rectangular courtyard at the rear of the house is enclosed by walls, and includes a former office range to the southeast, pavilions in the northwest and northeast corners, and a gatehouse in the centre of the north wall. The walls are in red brick with stone coping and are about 4 metres (13 ft) high. The office range is in brick with sandstone dressings, it has two storeys, a central block of seven bays, and recessed wings. The pavilions are in sandstone, and have one storey and pyramidal roofs. The gateway is in sandstone, with two storeys and three bays. The central bay projects and contains a central round-arched carriage entrance, with sash windows in the outer bays. In the upper storey is a clock face, and blind panels in the outer bays. On the top is a circular open cupola with eight Tuscan columns carrying an entablature and a lead dome.	II*
Kitchen garden walls, Attingham Park; 52.68947°N 2.67330°W		c. 1783–85	The walls enclose the kitchen garden, and are in red brick with sandstone coping and hinge blocks. They form a rectangular plan about 70 metres (230 ft) by 120 metres (390 ft). Two corners are curved, and spurs from the other two corners lead to square end piers. There is a segmental-headed doorway in the centre of each side.	II
Stable Block, Attingham Park; 52.68584°N 2.66964°W		1785	The stable block, later used for other purposes, is in red brick with dressings in grey Grinshill sandstone. It has a square courtyard plan with pyramidal-roofed corner pavilions, and there are parts with two storeys and parts with one storey and a loft. In the east range is a central block with an entrance and a coach house with a frieze, a moulded cornice, and a hipped roof. In the middle is a round carriage arch with a blind tympanum and a triangular pediment. In the south range is a central pavilion with a round carriage arch, now blocked, with paired Tuscan pilasters, a frieze, a moulded cornice, and an interrupted balustraded parapet. The windows are sashes.	II*
Lawrence memorial 52.67839°N 2.68045°W	—	1789	The memorial is in the churchyard of St Eata's Church, and is to the memory of Edward Lawrence. It is in sandstone and consists of a pedestal tomb with recessed panels, a moulded cornice, and an ogee cap.	II
Back Lodge, Attingham Park; 52.68619°N 2.67852°W		1796–99	The lodge is at the western entrance to the grounds. It is in brick, partly rendered, on a plinth, and has a slate roof. There are two storeys, a front of three bays, and a central projecting two-storey porch with an embattled parapet. The porch contains a first-floor circular window, and two doors in an arched recess containing an arched fanlight with Y-tracery. The flanking bays contain arched windows with Y-tracery, and quatrefoil windows above. Elsewhere are casement windows, and at the rear is a lower two-storey block.	II
Canal bridge 52.69664°N 2.68091°W	—	c. 1797	An accommodation bridge carrying a track over a disused branch of the Shropshire Union Canal. It is in brick with grey sandstone coping. The bridge consists of a single segmental arch with a projecting keystone, a string course, a curved parapet, and square end piers with pyramidal caps.	II
Ha-ha, Attingham Park; 52.68402°N 2.66774°W		c. 1798	The ha-ha is in the grounds to the southeast of the house. It is in red brick with sandstone coping. The ha-ha is about 200 metres (660 ft) long and 1 metre (3 ft 3 in) high.	II
Nos. 3–6 Atcham; 52.67940°N 2.67875°W		Late 18th or early 19th century	A row of four cottages in rendered brick with sandstone dressings and a tile roof. They have an L-shaped plan, and partly have one storey with attics, and partly two storeys. On the north front are gabled dormers with bargeboards and finials. On the west front is a canted bay window with ogee-headed windows containing Y-tracery.	II
Nos. 3 and 4 Berwick Wharf; 52.69361°N 2.67684°W	—	Late 18th or early 19th century	A pair of former canal workers' houses, they are timber framed with rendered infill and a hipped slate roof. The houses have two storeys, four bays, and a lean-to at the right. The windows are casements.	II
Coach house, stable block and wall, Cronkhill; 52.67037°N 2.68867°W	—	Late 18th or early 19th century (probable)	The building is in red brick with a hipped slate roof. There is a central block with two storeys and three bays, and recessed flanking one-storey wings. Some windows are cross-windows, and others are casements. In the centre is a porch with a parapeted gable and a segmental arch, and to the right is a door with a segmental-headed fanlight. To the east is a short section of wall with a quadrant curve and containing a doorway.	II
Group of five chest tombs 52.67825°N 2.68054°W	—	Late 18th or early 19th century	The chest tombs are in the churchyard of St Eata's Church, and are in sandstone. Each tomb stands on a plinth, and other features include balusters, panels, pilasters, cornices, and inscriptions.	II
Cronkhill; 52.67031°N 2.68782°W		1802	A country house designed by John Nash in Italianate style, and incorporating material from a previous house. It is in stuccoed brick on a plinth, with grey sandstone dressings and hipped slate roofs. There are two storeys, and a rectangular plan with a circular tower at the northeast and a square tower at the southwest. The main block has two bays at the front and one at the side, and in the ground floor is a balustraded loggia with six arches on the front and four on the side. The upper floor contains round-headed windows. The round tower also has round-headed windows with oeil-de-boeuf windows at the top, and a pyramidal roof with a globe finial and a weathervane. The windows are sashes. At the rear is some timber framing from the earlier house.	I
Cronkhill Lodge; 52.66895°N 2.68723°W	—	c. 1802	The lodge is in red brick on a plinth, with a hipped slate roof, and two storeys. It has a Y-shaped plan consisting of a central hexagonal core, and three projecting wings. The windows are casements with segmental heads.	II
Sundial, Cronkhill; 52.66994°N 2.68769°W	—	c. 1802	The sundial is in grey sandstone. It consists of a chamfered square shaft on a square plinth, with a moulded capital and a square top. The dial is missing.	II
Longner Hall and wall 52.69502°N 2.69867°W		1803	A country house designed by John Nash in Tudor Revival style. It is in red sandstone with dressings in grey sandstone, brick and rendered brick in the service wings, and a tile roof. The house has an L-shaped plan, the main block having two main ranges and a cross-wing, and a service wing projects from the northwest corner. The main block has a plinth, a moulded cornice, an embattled parapet, and pinnacles. The windows are casements, some with Y-tracery, and there are oriel windows, and two two-storey canted bay windows. Features in the service wing include a clock tower with an ogee lead dome and a weathervane.	I
Game larder, ice house, walls, and tower, Longner Hall; 52.69523°N 2.69922°W	—	c. 1803	The tower and courtyard walls were designed by John Nash, and the game larder dates from 1842. The walls are in red brick and sandstone with embattled coping, and are about 40 metres (130 ft) long. The tower is in rendered brick and has a square plan and an embattled parapet. The game larder and ice house are in red brick with a pyramidal tile roof. They have an octagonal plan, one storey and a semi-basement. On the top is an octagonal wooden cupola with an embattled parapet and an ogee lead dome.	II
Forecourt walls, gate piers and gate, Longner Hall; 52.69532°N 2.69779°W	—	c. 1803	The walls and gate piers are in red sandstone. The walls have a moulded plinth and chamfered coping. They are about 80 metres (260 ft) long, and have an L-shaped plan with a return to the northeast. The centre of each part is balustraded. In the southern part are square gate piers with moulded plinths, sides with arched panels, and pyramidal caps. In the northeast return are two octagonal gate piers with moulded plinths, battlemented pyramidal caps and wooden gates.	II
Kitchen garden walls and former kennels, Longner Hall; 52.69618°N 2.69986°W	—	c. 1803	The walls enclose the kitchen garden, they are in red brick with stone coping, and about 4 metres (13 ft) high. The garden is rectangular, measuring about 70 metres (230 ft) by 40 metres (130 ft), and in the south wall is a doorway. The former kennels are to the west and have pen walls in red sandstone, and there is a brick lean-to with a tile roof.	II
Wall and gate pier adjoining Longner Hall; 52.69547°N 2.69863°W	—	c. 1803	The short section of wall and the gate pier adjacent to the north of the hall were designed by John Nash in Tudor Revival style. They are in red sandstone, the wall is about 4 metres (13 ft) high and 4 metres (13 ft) long. It has a plinth, a string course, and embattled coping. The gate pier is octagonal with an embattled parapet and a pyramidal cap with a globe finial.	II
Wall and gate pier to north of Longner Hall; 52.69556°N 2.69860°W	—	c. 1803	The short section of wall and the gate pier to the north of the hall were designed by John Nash in Tudor Revival style. They are in red sandstone, the wall is about 4 metres (13 ft) high and 6 metres (20 ft) long. It has a plinth, a string course, and embattled coping. The wall contains a central chamfered arched doorway flanked by recessed Latin crosses. The gate pier is octagonal with an embattled parapet and a pyramidal cap with a globe finial.	II
Longner Lodge; 52.68201°N 2.67960°W		c. 1803	The lodge at the entrance to the drive to Longner Hall is in red brick with grey sandstone dressings, and is in Tudor Revival style. It is on a plinth and has a tiled roof with parapeted gables, moulded copings and tall finials. The windows are mullioned and transomed with hood moulds. The porch has a moulded four-centred arched head, a hood mould, and an embattled parapet with a shield. In the right return is a square bay window with an embattled parapet.	II
Gates, gate piers and walls, Longner Lodge; 52.68184°N 2.67955°W	—	c. 1803	The gate piers and walls are at the entrance to the drive to Longner Hall, and are in red sandstone. The piers are octagonal, and each has a moulded base, a frieze with shields and quatrefoil panels, a moulded top, an ogee cap, and a crocketed finial. Each wall has a straight section and a quadrant, with piers at the junctions and the ends.	II
Garden steps and urns, Longner Hall; 52.69473°N 2.69847°W	—	c. 1803–04	The garden steps are to the southeast of the hall. They consist of a flight of five steps with a pair of pineapple urns at the top, all in grey sandstone.	II
Ha-ha, Longner Hall; 52.69480°N 2.69960°W	—	c. 1803–04	The ha-ha runs to the south and east of the hall. It is in red sandstone and has an L-shaped plan. The ha-ha is about 200 metres (660 ft) long, and between 1 metre (3 ft 3 in) and 2 metres (6 ft 7 in) high, and has buttresses on the south side.	II
Sundial, Longner Hall; 52.69476°N 2.69890°W	—	c. 1803–04	The sundial is in the garden of the hall, and is in grey sandstone. It has a moulded base, and a twisted and fluted baluster-stem. The top is octagonal and has a copper dial plate and gnomon.	II
Urn, Longner Hall; 52.69501°N 2.69896°W	—	c. 1803–04	The urn is in the garden of the hall, and is in grey sandstone. It has a base in the form of an inverted capital, and the body of the urn is reeded.	II
North gates and gate piers, Attingham Park; 52.69312°N 2.67589°W	—	c. 1805–07	The gate piers are in grey sandstone and have chamfered corners and pyramidal caps. The gates are in wrought iron and have spearhead railings.	II
Screen wall and pier (east), Attingham Park entrance 52.67991°N 2.67898°W	—	c. 1805–07	The screen wall and end pier are to the east of the entrance. The wall is in red brick with a sandstone plinth and coping, and is about 20 metres (66 ft) long. The pier is in grey sandstone, and has banded rustication, a moulded plinth, a frieze, a moulded cornice, and a swagged urn finial.	II
Screen wall and pier (west), Attingham Park entrance 52.67999°N 2.67949°W	—	c. 1805–07	The screen wall and end pier are to the west of the entrance. The wall is in red brick with a sandstone plinth and coping, and is about 20 metres (66 ft) long. The pier is in grey sandstone, and has banded rustication, a moulded plinth, a frieze, a moulded cornice, and a swagged urn finial.	II
Walford memorial 52.67840°N 2.68033°W	—	1814	The memorial is in the churchyard of St Eata's Church, and is to the memory of members of the Walford family. It is a pedestal tomb in sandstone, and in Classical style. The memorial has a circular plan on a square stepped base. The drum has a plinth and an anthemion frieze, and it carries inscriptions.	II
Bee house, Attingham Park; 52.68860°N 2.67364°W	—	Early 19th century (probable)	The bee house is near the kitchen garden, and is in weatherboarded timber framing with a hipped slate roof. There is one storey, a front of six bays, and sides of three bays. It contains openings with depressed arches.	II
Former coach house and stables, Chilton Grove; 52.67737°N 2.70121°W	—	Early 19th century	The buildings are in red brick with stone sills and hinge blocks, and a tile roof hipped to the right. They have an L-shaped plan, and two storeys. The openings include doors, a coach house entrance, windows, and loft doors.	II
Bull pens, sheds, loose boxes, and walls, Cronkhill; 52.67013°N 2.68859°W	—	Early 19th century	Part of a model farm, the buildings are in red brick with stone hinge blocks, and hipped slate roofs. They have an F-shaped plan, with chamfered corners, and one storey. The bull pens and loose boxes have segmental-headed doorways, the shelter sheds have open fronts and cast iron columns, and the walls have stone copings.	II
Cow house, pigsties, shed and wall, Cronkhill; 52.67014°N 2.68824°W	—	Early 19th century	Part of a model farm, the buildings are in red brick with stone hinge blocks, and slate roofs, hipped over the cowsheds. They have one storey and contain doorways and windows. There are four pigsties with segmental-headed openings and pens with stone coping.	II
Stables, cow house, loose box, fodder room and accommodation, Cronkhill; 52.66993°N 2.68860°W	—	Early 19th century	Part of a model farm, the buildings are in red brick with stone hinge blocks, and roofs of slate and corrugated iron. They form an L-shaped plan and are partly in one storey and partly in two. The buildings contain various openings, including doors, windows, and pitching holes, and there is an external flight of nine steps to a loft door.	II
Howells memorial 52.67846°N 2.68061°W	—	Early 19th century	The memorial is in the churchyard of St Eata's Church, and is to the memory of members of the Howells family. It is in sandstone, and consists of a chest tomb. The tomb has a moulded plinth, panels with beading, fluted pilasters, a moulded cornice, and a chamfered top.	II
Farmbuildings, dovecote, walls and mounting block, Longner Hall; 52.69584°N 2.69908°W	—	Early 19th century	The farm buildings are in red brick with tile roofs, and form a U-shaped plan around a farmyard. The dovecote has a square plan, a pyramidal roof, and a square cupola with a pyramidal cap. A red sandstone wall encloses the farmyard to the south, and also encloses a semicircular pound in the farmyard. Adjoining the wall is a mounting block.	II
Stables, garages, former granary, and coach house, Longner Hall; 52.69549°N 2.69922°W	—	Early 19th century	The outbuildings are in red brick with stone dressings and tiled roofs. The form an L-shaped plan, and have a variety of openings, including doorways, windows, loft doors, and pitching holes. The stables have retained stalls.	II
Milestone, Atcham Bridge; 52.67955°N 2.68188°W	—	Early 19th century (probable)	The milestone is at the west end of Atcham Bridge, and is in cast iron. It has a triangular section and a chamfered top, and is inscribed with the distances in miles to London, to Shifnal and to "SALOP" (Shrewsbury).	II
Milestone, Emstrey Cottages; 52.68761°N 2.69926°W	—	Early 19th century (probable)	The milestone is near Emstrey Cottages, and is in cast iron. It has a triangular section and a chamfered top, and is inscribed with the distances in miles to London, to Shifnal and to "SALOP" (Shrewsbury).	II
The Old Vicarage; 52.67849°N 2.67988°W		Early 19th century	Part of a former vicarage, later a private house, it is in red brick on a plinth, with some stone dressings, a dentil eaves cornice, and a two-span tiled roof with coped parapeted gables. There are two storeys and four bays. On the front is a gabled porch, and the windows are sashes.	II
Barn, Cronkhill; 52.67006°N 2.68902°W	—	Early to mid 19th century	Part of a model farm, the barn is in red brick and has a hipped slate roof. It is partly in two storeys and partly in one. It contains cart entrances, doorways and windows, many with segmental heads, and five tiers of vents.	II
Pump, Cronkhill; 52.66889°N 2.68696°W	—	Early to mid 19th century	The pump is in cast iron. It has a fluted shaft, a splayed spout, a fluted top, a domed cap with a finial, and a straight handle.	II
No. 2 Atcham and Smithy; 52.67912°N 2.67891°W	—	Mid 19th century	The house and smithy are in red brick with tiled roofs. The house has a plinth, a band, and a dentil eaves cornice. There are two storeys with an attic, and two bays. In the ground floor the windows are sashes, and in the upper floor they are casements. Above the door is a segmental-headed fanlight. To the left is a single-storey smithy.	II
Entrance screen and lodges, Attingham Park; 52.67995°N 2.67920°W		1862	The structure is in grey sandstone, and has five arches flanked by screen walls. In the centre is a round-headed carriage arch flanked by Doric half-columns, and above it is an inscribed frieze. Outside are smaller pedestrian arches containing wrought iron gates. The outermost arches are part of the lodges that have two storeys, rusticated pilasters, narrow sash windows in the ground floor and lunettes above. On the top of the screen are urn finials.	II*
Pump, Longner Hall; 52.69564°N 2.69928°W	—	Mid to late 19th century	The pump is in cast iron. It has a circular shaft with moulded rings, a fluted top with a splayed spout, and a fluted domed cap with a finial. The handle is missing.	II
Telephone kiosk 52.67922°N 2.67893°W	—	1935	A K6 type telephone kiosk, designed by Giles Gilbert Scott. Constructed in cast iron with a square plan and a dome, it has three unperforated crowns in the top panels.	II
