= Marie Françoise Bernard =

French activist (1819–1901)

Marie Françoise "Fanny" Bernard
- Born: Marie Françoise Martin
- Known for: Anti-vivisection campaigner
- Spouse: Claude Bernard
- Children: Two daughters, Jeanne-Henriette and Marie-Claude, and a son who died in infancy

Marie Françoise "Fanny" Bernard (née Martin) (16 September 1819 – 9 October 1901) was a French anti-vivisection campaigner and creator of an anti-vivisection society. She was the wife of the pioneer in experimental research in physiology, Claude Bernard.

== Background ==
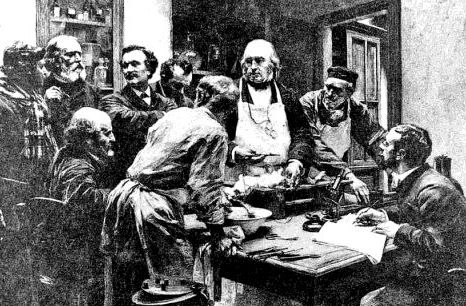
A painting by Léon Augustin L'hermitte of Claude Bernard (center) in his laboratory in the College de France, Paris.

Marie Françoise Martin married Claude Bernard on Wednesday 7 May 1845, and it was her dowry from her father, a physician, that allowed him to pursue his studies under François Magendie at the Collège de France in Paris. They had three children—Jeanne-Henriette, Marie-Claude, and a son who died in infancy.

Marie Françoise became opposed to her husband's research methods. Magendie, Claude Bernard and his fellow physiologists—men such as Charles Richet in France and Michael Foster in England—were strongly criticized for the vivisection they carried out on animals, particularly dogs. Anti-vivisectionists infiltrated Magendie's lectures in Paris, where he was dissecting dogs without anaesthetic, allegedly shouting "Tais-toi, pauvre bête!" ("Shut up, you poor beast!") while he worked on them.

She separated from Bernard in 1870.

== Arthur de Bretagne ==
At the age of 19 Claude Bernard wrote a play called Arthur de Bretagne, which was published only after his death. Marie Françoise and her daughters alleged that it contained a preface that defamed them. They are thought to have sued to have the copies of the play destroyed. However, there was a radio production in 1936, and a second edition appeared in 1943.

== Experimental Animals: A Reality Fiction ==
In 2016, the American author of experimental literature Thalia Field published Experimental Animals: A Reality Fiction, a thoroughly-researched novel in which she writes about Claude Bernard and the nineteenth-century animal rights movement from the point of view of Marie-Françoise "Fanny" Bernard.

== See also ==
- Brown Dog affair
- Frances Power Cobbe
- Anna Kingsford
- Caroline Earle White
