= Claude Bernard =

French physiologist (1813–1878)

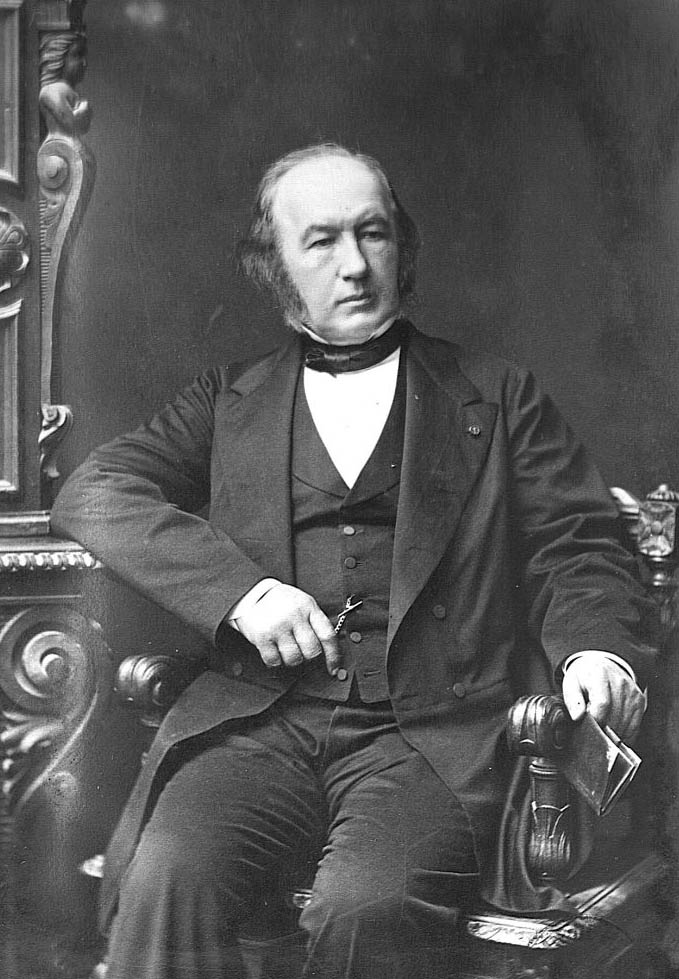
- Born: 12 July 1813; Saint-Julien, Rhône, France
- Died: 10 February 1878 (aged 64); Paris, France
- Education: University of Paris
- Known for: Milieu intérieur (internal environment)
- Spouse: Marie Françoise Martin (m. 1845; sep. 1869)
- Children: Two daughters, Jeanne-Henriette and Marie-Claude, and a son who died in infancy
- Awards: Baly Medal (1869); Copley Medal (1876)
- Scientific career
- Fields: Physiology
- Workplaces: Muséum national d'Histoire naturelle
- Patrons: Louis Napoleon
- Thesis: Recherches sur une nouvelle fonction du foie, considéré comme organe producteur de matière sucrée chez l'homme et les animaux (1853)

Claude Bernard (French: [klod bɛʁnaʁ]; 12 July 1813 – 10 February 1878) was a French physiologist. I. Bernard Cohen of Harvard University called Bernard "one of the greatest of all men of science". He originated the term milieu intérieur and the associated concept of homeostasis (the latter term being coined by Walter Cannon).

== Life ==
Bernard was born on 12 July 1813 in the village of Saint-Julien, near Villefranche-sur-Saône. He received his early education in the Jesuit school of that town, then attended college at Lyon, which he soon left to become assistant in a druggist's shop. He is sometimes described as an agnostic, and even humorously referred to by his colleagues as a "great priest of atheism". Despite this, after his death Cardinal Ferdinand Donnet claimed Bernard was a fervent Catholic, with a biographical entry in the Catholic Encyclopedia. His leisure hours were devoted to the composition of a vaudeville comedy, and the success it achieved moved him to attempt a prose drama in five acts, Arthur de Bretagne. The latter, a tragedy concerning Arthur I, Duke of Brittany, was published only after his death. A second edition appeared in 1943.

In 1834, at the age of twenty-one, he went to Paris to present this play to critic Saint-Marc Girardin, but was dissuaded from adopting literature as a profession. Girardin urged him to take up the study of medicine instead. Bernard followed his advice, later becoming an interne at the Hôtel-Dieu de Paris. There, he met physiologist François Magendie, who served as physician at the hospital. Bernard became preparateur (lab assistant) at the Collège de France in 1841.

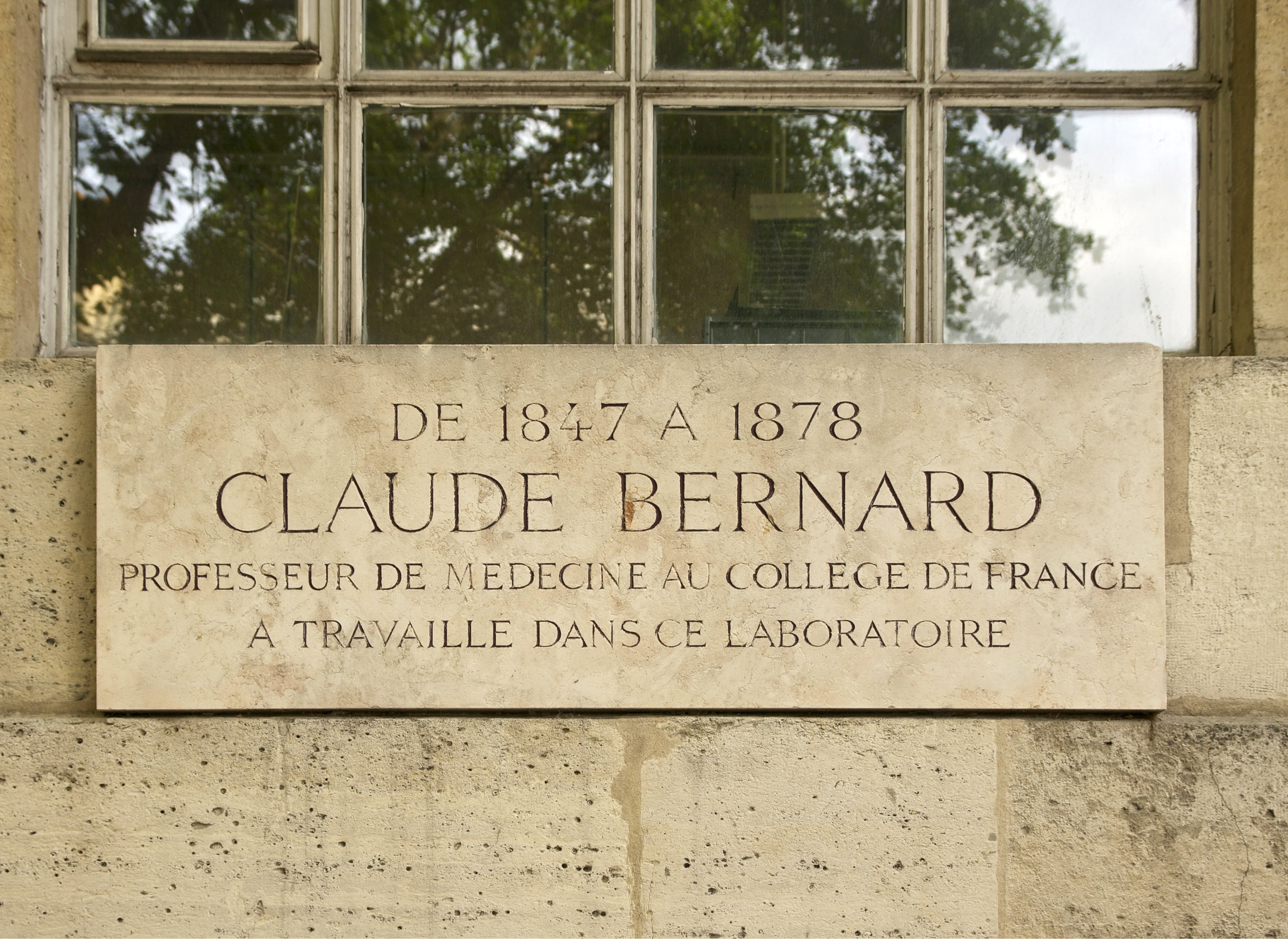
Memorial plaque in Paris marking the site of Claude Bernard's laboratory from 1847 until his death in 1878.

In 1845, he married Marie Françoise "Fanny" Martin for convenience; the marriage was arranged by a colleague and her dowry helped finance his experiments. In 1847 he was appointed Magendie's deputy-professor at the college, and in 1855 he succeeded him as full professor. In 1860, Bernard was elected an international member of the American Philosophical Society. His field of research was considered inferior at the time, and the laboratory assigned to him was a "regular cellar."

Bernard was chosen around this time to be the inaugural chair of physiology at the Sorbonne, but no laboratory was provided for his use. After speaking with Bernard in 1864, Louis Napoleon built a laboratory at the Muséum national d'Histoire naturelle in the Jardin des Plantes for him. At the same time, Napoleon III established a professorship which Bernard accepted, leaving the Sorbonne in 1868. In the same year, he was also admitted a member of the Académie Française and elected a foreign member of the Royal Swedish Academy of Sciences.

When he died on 10 February 1878, he was given a public funeral, which France had never allowed for a man of science. He was interred in Père Lachaise Cemetery in Paris.

== Career ==
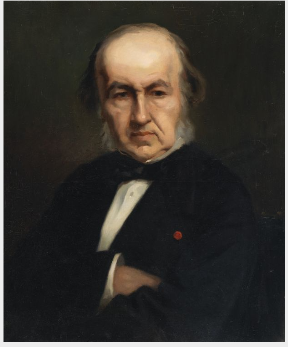
Portrait by Marcel Mangin

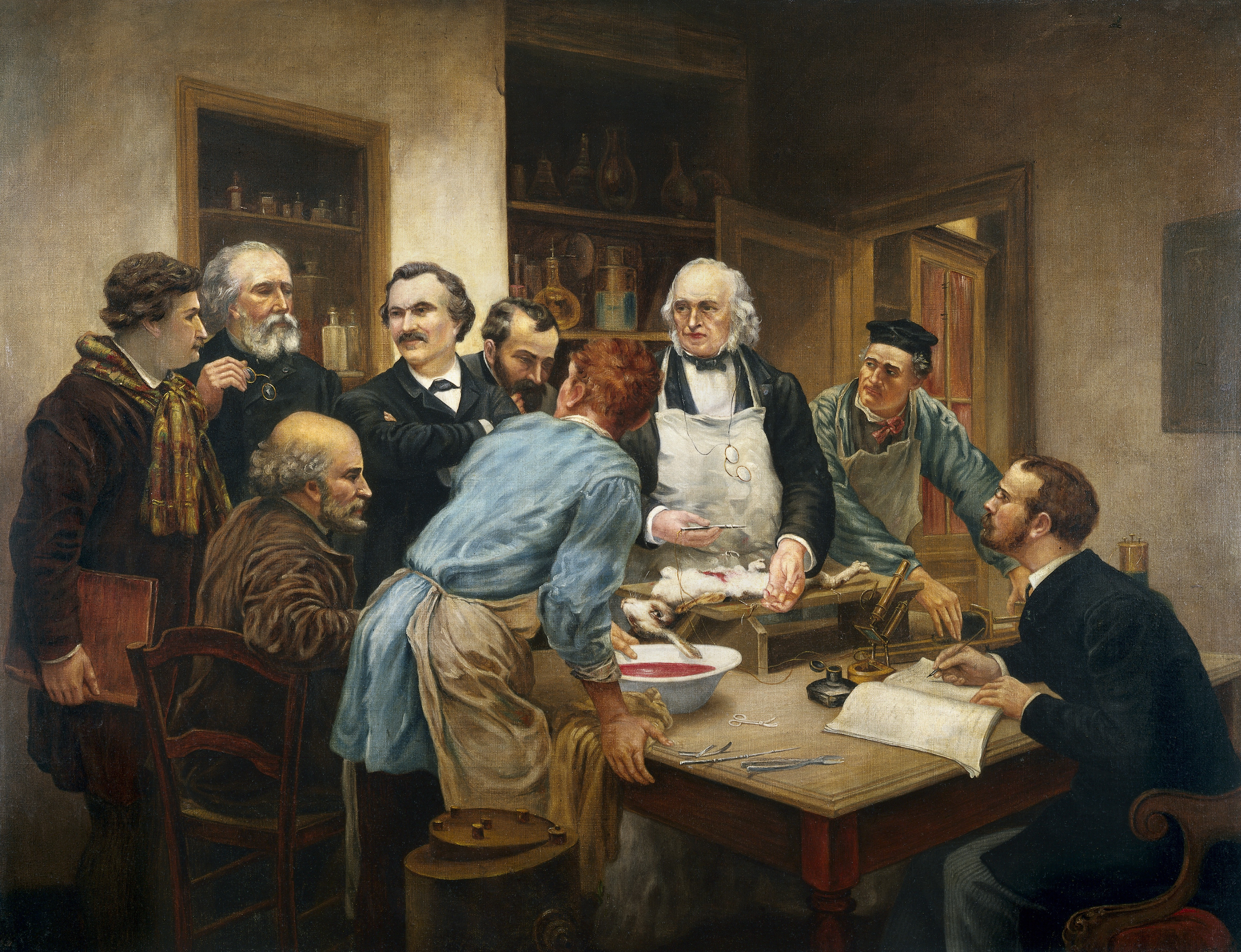
Oil painting depicting Bernard with his pupils

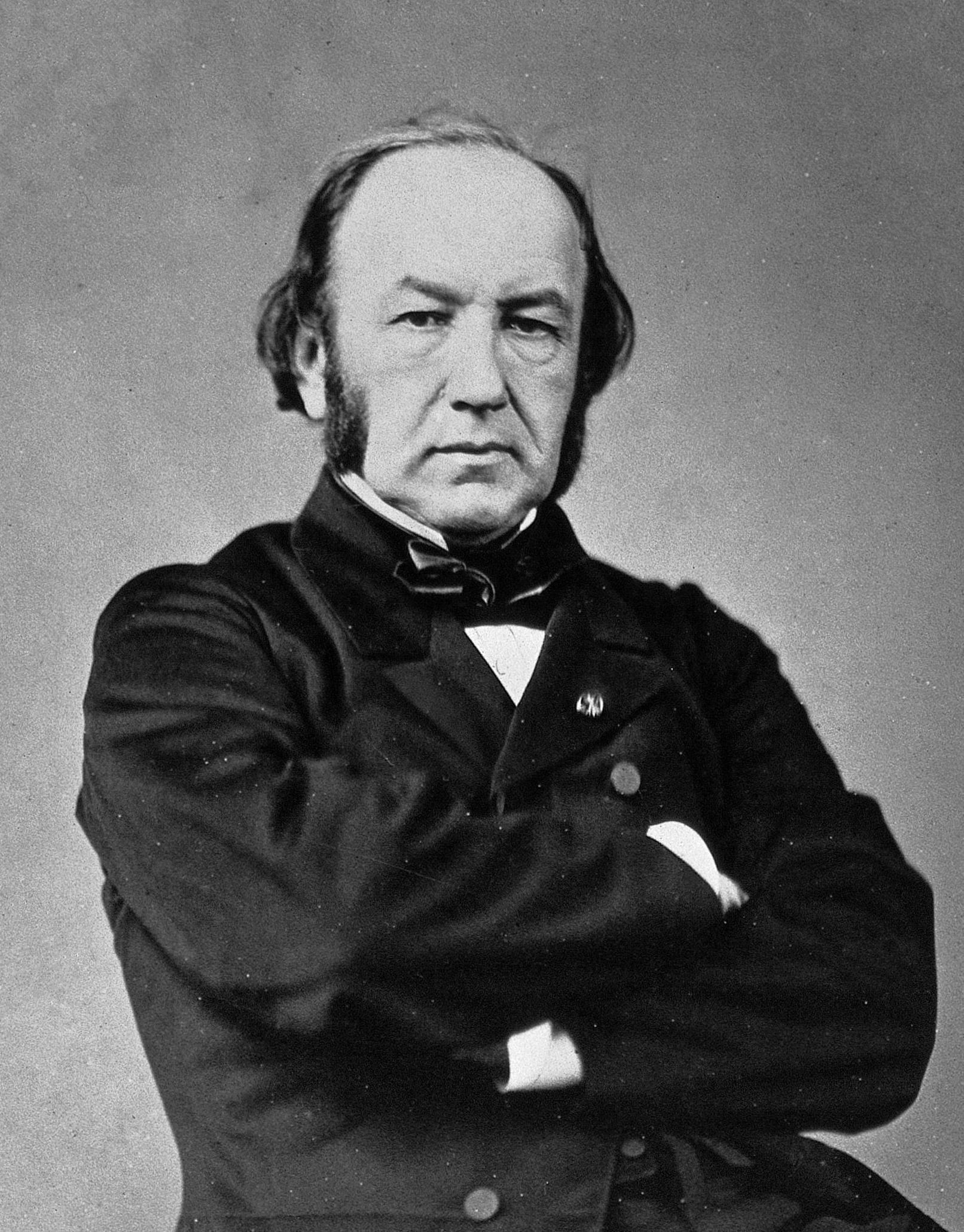
Claude Bernard

Bernard's first major work was on the functions of the pancreas. His discovery that the juices of the pancreas play a significant role in the digestive process won him the prize for experimental physiology from the French Academy of Sciences. His findings specifically showed that the pancreas secreted a fluid containing a lipolytic enzyme that split neutral fats into glycerol and fatty acids. Prior to his research, the function of the pancreas was poorly understood, with many physiologists considering it to be a gland of little significance. Bernard also discovered that introducing ether into the stomach or duodenum induced pancreatic secretions. The physiologist William Bayliss credited Bernard's work as influential in the former's discovery of secretin, the first hormone to be isolated.

In perhaps his most famous experiment, Bernard discovered the glycogenic function of the liver. The liver, in addition to secreting bile, also produces the sugars that can cause hyperglycemia, which helped advance study of diabetes mellitus and its causes. In 1851, while examining the effects produced in the temperature of various parts of the body by each section of the nerve or nerves belonging to them, Bernard noticed that division of the cervical sympathetic nerve resulted in more active circulation and more forcible pulsation of the arteries in certain parts of the head. A few months later, he observed that electrical excitation of the upper portion of the divided nerve had the contrary effect. This discovery of the vasomotor system also established the existence of both vasodilator and vasoconstrictor nerves.

Bernard's scientific discoveries were made through vivisection, of which he was the primary proponent in Europe at the time. In his description of the single-mindedness of scientists trying to prove their theories, he wrote: "[h]e does not hear the animals' cries of pain. He is blind to the blood that flows." His use of vivisection disgusted his wife and daughters, who returned at home once to discover that he had vivisected the family dog. The couple was officially separated in 1869 and his wife went on to actively campaign against the practice of vivisection. Some in the scientific community were also uncomfortable with the practice. The physician-scientist George Hoggan spent four months observing and working in Bernard's laboratory, later writing that his experiences there had "prepared [him] to see not only science, but even mankind, perish rather than have recourse to such means of saving it." Hoggan was a founding member of the National Anti-Vivisection Society in the mid-1870s.

Milieu intérieur, the "internal environment", is the key concept with which Bernard is associated. He explained that the body is "relatively independent" of the outside world, and that a healthy "internal environment" adapts to deficiencies in the surrounding environment, thus keeping the physiology balanced. This is the underlying principle of what would later be called homeostasis, a term coined by Walter Cannon.

Bernard was also interested in the physiological action of poisons, particularly curare and carbon monoxide gas. He is credited with first describing carbon monoxide's affinity for hemoglobin in 1857, although James Watt had drawn similar conclusions about hydrocarbonate's affinity for blood acting as "an antidote to the oxygen" in 1794 prior to the discoveries of carbon monoxide and hemoglobin.

Throughout his career, Bernard sought to establish the use in medicine of what would later become the scientific method. In An Introduction to the Study of Experimental Medicine (1865), he emphasized the importance of trusting evidence over clout, even if it "contradicts a prevailing theory," as "[t]heories are only hypotheses" proven or disproven by facts. He criticized scientists who cherry-picked their data only to prove their own hypotheses. Unlike many scientific writers of his time, Bernard wrote using the first person when discussing his own experiments and thoughts.

== Honors and awards ==
Bernard received numerous honours, including the Baly Medal of the Royal College of Physicians in 1869. His Introduction à l’étude de la médecine expérimentale (1865) outlined his philosophy of scientific method and remains a foundational text in experimental medicine. Upon his death in 1878, he was given a state funeral, an honour rarely granted to scientists.

== Scientific debates and critiques ==
Bernard's glycogenic theory drew criticism from Frederick Pavy, who argued that hepatic sugar originated from circulating blood rather than synthesis. The debate persisted for decades until biochemical evidence confirmed Bernard's interpretation. Later work by von Mering and Minkowski on pancreatic diabetes further refined his conclusions about glucose regulation.
