= Atcham =

Village in Shropshire, England

Coordinates: 52.6796°N 2.6799°W

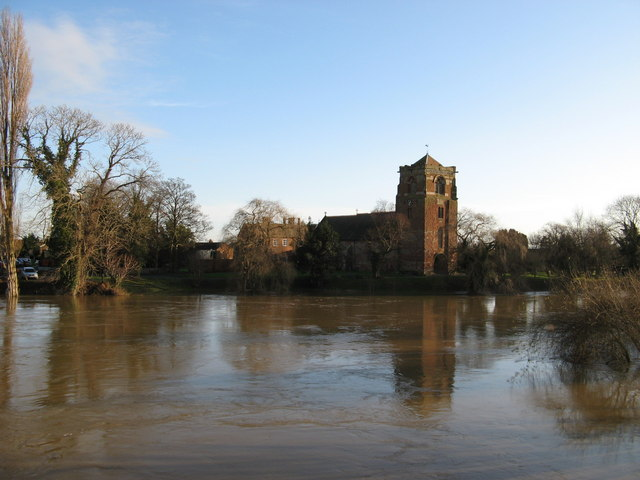
- River Severn at Atcham

- Location within Shropshire
- Population: 243 (2001)
- OS grid reference: SJ542092
- Civil parish: Atcham
- Unitary authority: Shropshire
- Ceremonial county: Shropshire
- Region: West Midlands
- Country: England
- Sovereign state: United Kingdom
- Post town: SHREWSBURY
- Postcode district: SY5
- Dialling code: 01743
- Police: West Mercia
- Fire: Shropshire
- Ambulance: West Midlands
- UK Parliament: South Shropshire

Atcham is a village, ecclesiastical parish and civil parish in Shropshire, England. It lies on the B4380 (once the A5), 5 miles south-east of Shrewsbury. The River Severn flows round the village. To the south is the village of Cross Houses and to the north-west the hamlet of Emstrey.

== Local governance ==
Atcham once belonged and gave its name to Atcham Rural District, before the village merged into the Borough of Shrewsbury in 1974 and came under Shrewsbury and Atcham Borough Council. From 2009, Shrewsbury and Atcham joined the other districts of non-metropolitan Shropshire under Shropshire Council. The Parliamentary constituency covering the borough remained as Shrewsbury and Atcham until under constituency boundary changes in 2024 it was redesignated as Shrewsbury, dropping the Atcham name. In population (243 in 2001), Atcham was the smallest village to be named in a UK Parliamentary constituency.

== History ==
The village has the only church in England dedicated to Saint Eata, Bishop of Hexham. The reason for the dedication is unclear, as there is no written record of Eata coming so far south. However, there is a crop photograph from the 1970s of a field in Attingham Park showing the site of a Saxon palace identical to one excavated near Hexham. "Atcham" is a contraction of "Attingham", meaning "the home of Eata's people". The church building dates from the 11th century.

The local airfield RAF Atcham, now returned to agriculture and light industry, was held by an American training unit for much of World War II. It used P-47 Thunderbolts and later P-38 Lightnings for operational training of fighter pilots posted in from the United States. Almost 50 pilots were lost in accidents flying from there.

The A5 London–Holyhead road once crossed the village, but now runs to the north on a dual-carriageway.

== Notable people ==
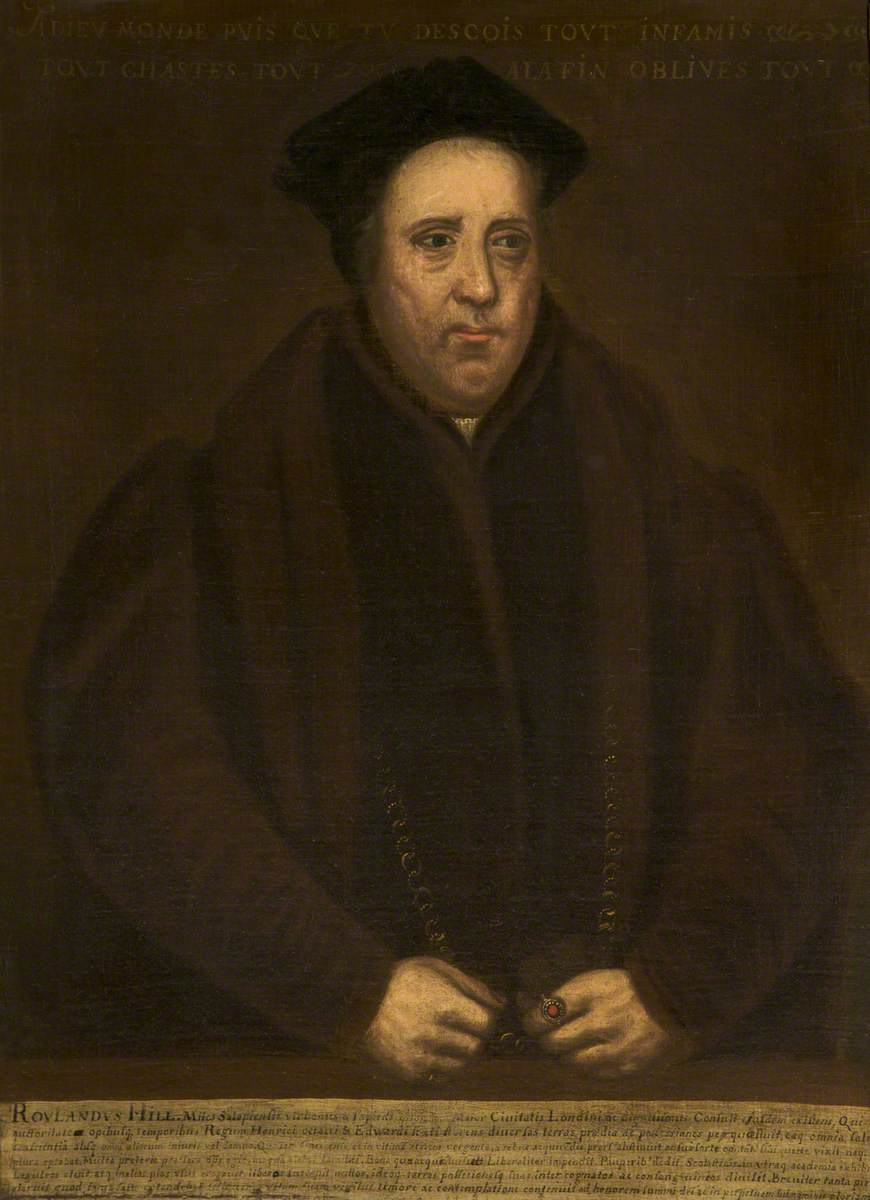
Sir Rowland Hill

In order of birth:

- Ordericus Vitalis (1075 – c. 1142), chronicler and Benedictine monk, was baptised in the village.
- Sir Rowland Hill of Soulton, convenor of the Geneva Bible translation, possible inspiration for the character Old Sir Rowland in Shakespeare's play As You Like built the first stone bridge over the river here as part of his wider civic projects across London and Shropshire.
- Noel Hill, 1st Baron Berwick (1745–1789), politician and landowner, builder of Attingham Park, was buried at the village church.
- Anna Kingsford (1846–1888), first female English medical graduate and vegetarian, was buried at the village church.
- Thomas Wallace Southam (1900–1990), businessman and amateur composer, was born in Atcham.
- Marjorie Chibnall (1915-2012), eminent medieval historian and editor of Orderic Vitalis' Historia Ecclesiastica.
- Digby Tatham-Warter (1917–1993), Second World War British Army officer famed for carrying an umbrella.
- Dick Sale (1919–1987), first-class cricketer and school headmaster, was born in the village.

== Features ==
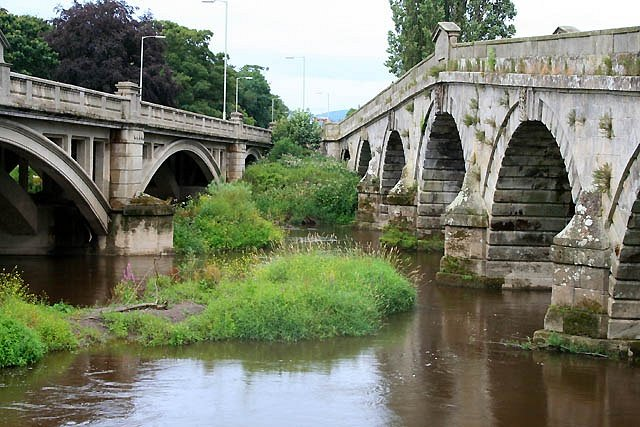
The two bridges at Atcham

Landmarks at Atcham include Attingham Park, seat of the Berwick barons until the title became extinct in 1953. The hall at Attingham Park is now the regional headquarters of the National Trust. Also on the estate is the Shropshire office of Natural England. Adjacent to Attingham Park is Home Farm, Attingham. Now separate from the hall that it traditionally supplied, it is a family-run organic farm and tearoom open to the public.

The older of the two bridges at Atcham, built in 1769–1771 by John Gwynn, is commonly known as Atcham Bridge. It is both Grade II* listed and a scheduled monument. Its replacement, opened in 1929, carries the old A5 (B4380) road over the River Severn.

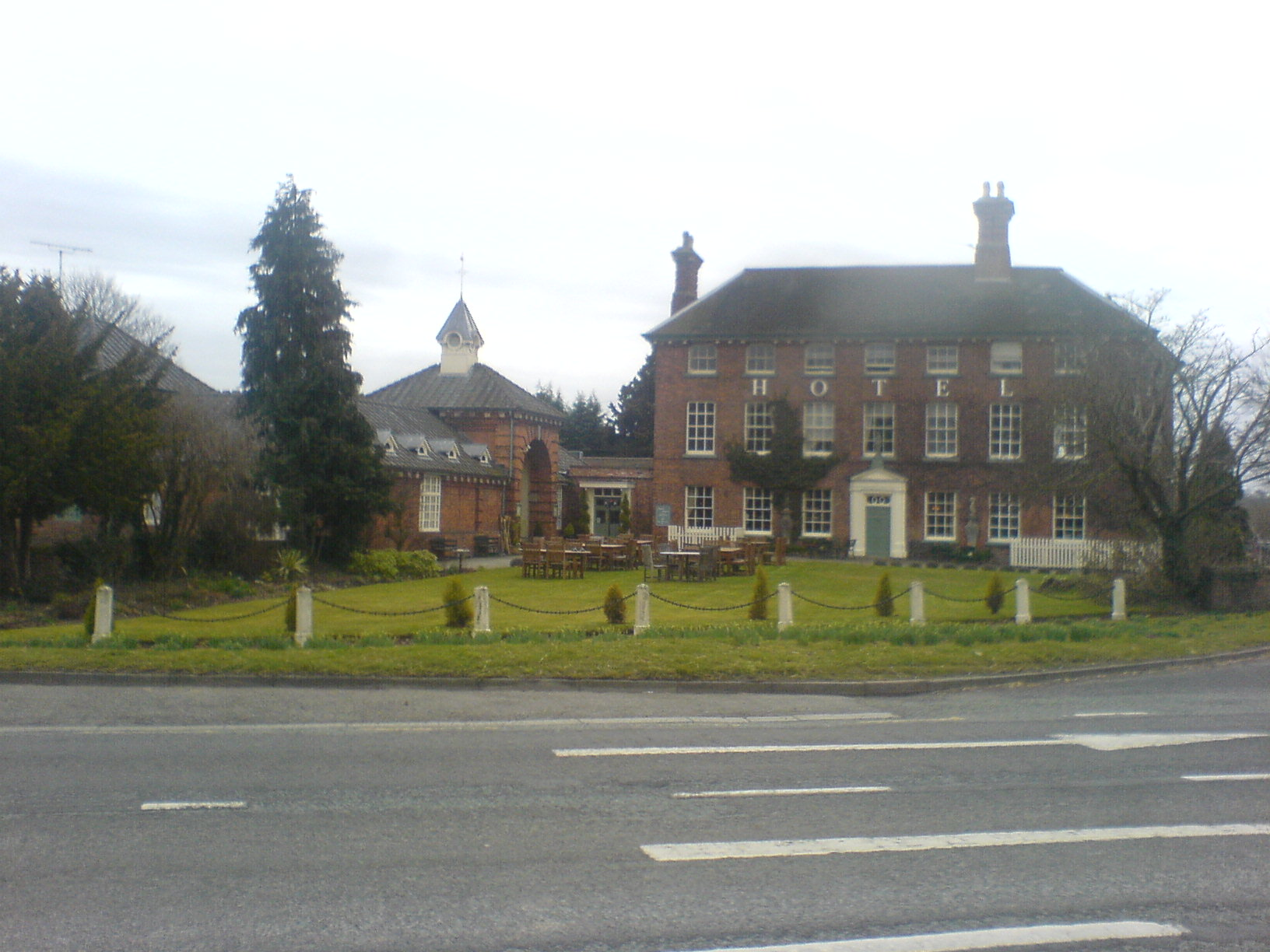
The Mytton & Mermaid, located in the centre of the village on the bank of the Severn

The village has a public house, the Mytton & Mermaid, owned at one time by Clough Williams-Ellis as a staging post to his iconic Italianate village of Portmeirion. The school closed half a century ago. The post office and petrol station, located adjacent to the old school, have also closed. The old school buildings and adjacent house were sold to Mr and Mrs Caswell in 1982, who have since run a small car sales and repair business.

Atcham has a timber-framed village hall, the Malthouse, built in the 17th century as such, but after disuse converted in the 19th century into a carpenter's shop for the Attingham estate. It was opened after restoration in 1925 as the village hall and dedicated to the memory of the men of Atcham who had died in First World War. It has a sprung floor bought from a dance hall in Shrewsbury.

Outside the parish to the east, is the village of Wroxeter, formerly a Roman town and currently the site of one of Shropshire's commercial vineyards. Also there is the Atcham Business Park/Industrial Estate on the site of the old airfield. Despite its name, it lies in the neighbouring civil parish of Wroxeter and Uppington, although after the Diocese of Lichfield made some boundary changes, it is now in the ecclesiastical parish of Atcham.

== See also ==
- Listed buildings in Atcham
