= Wem =

Town and civil parish in Shropshire, England

- Market town
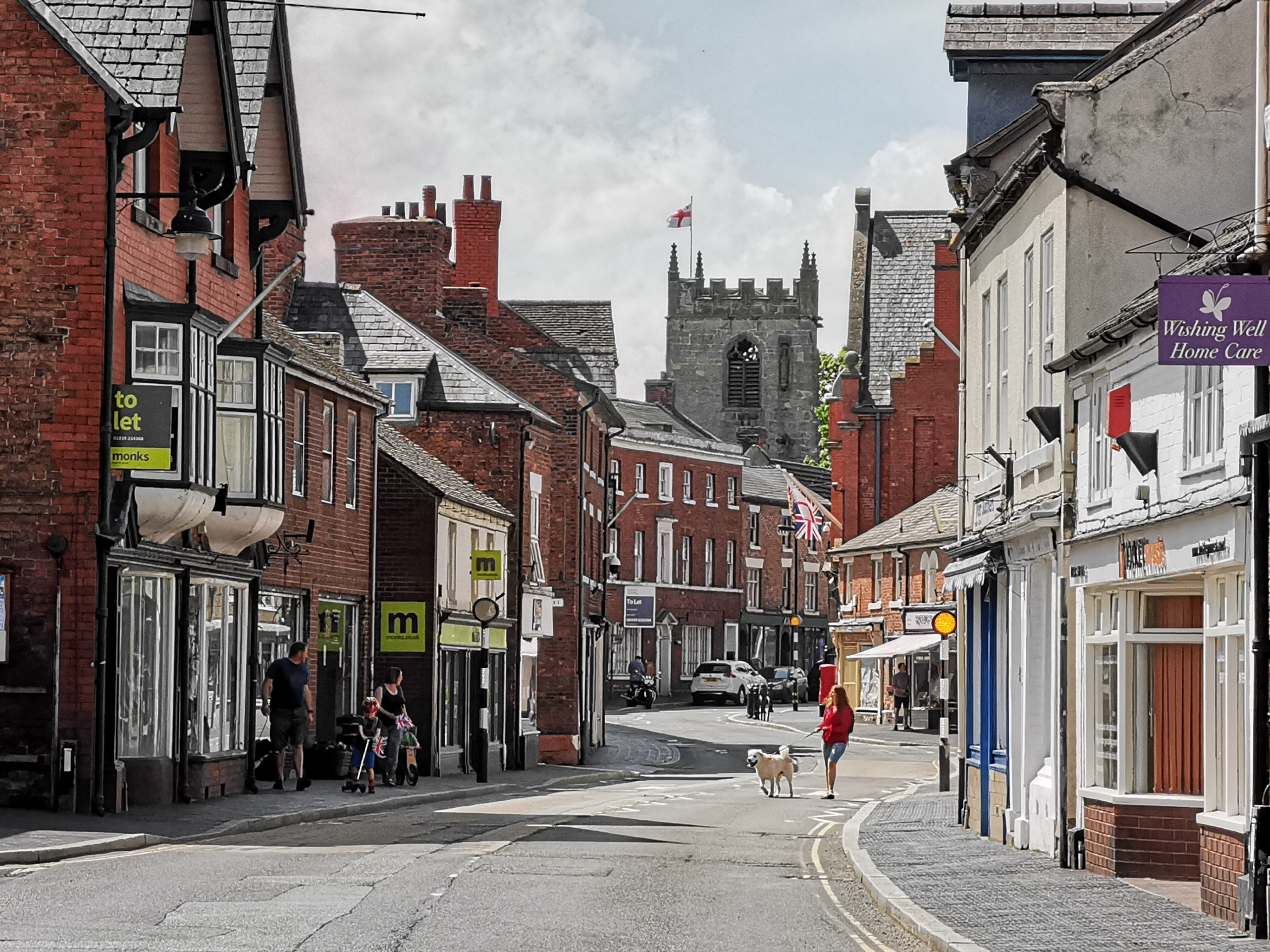
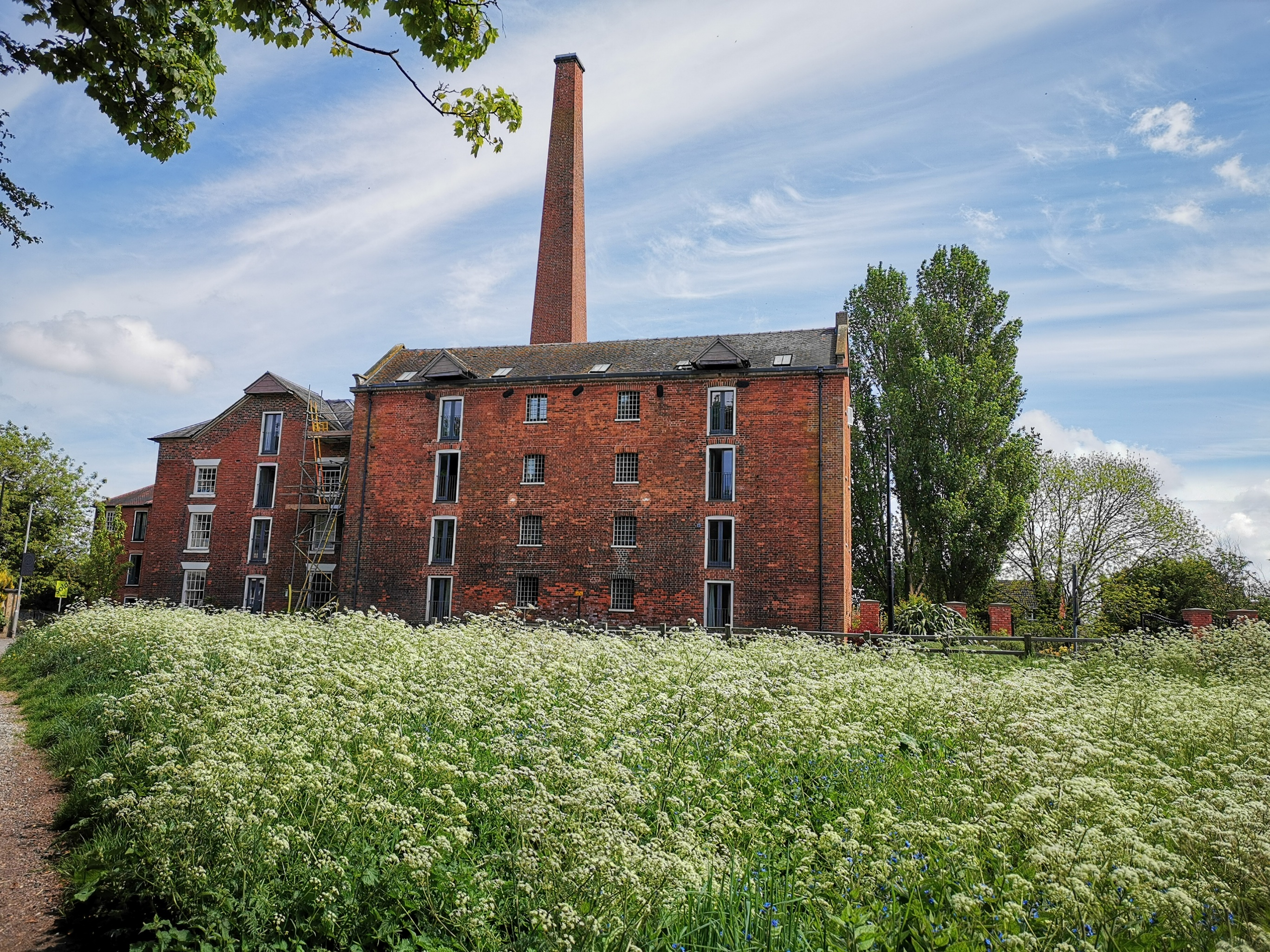
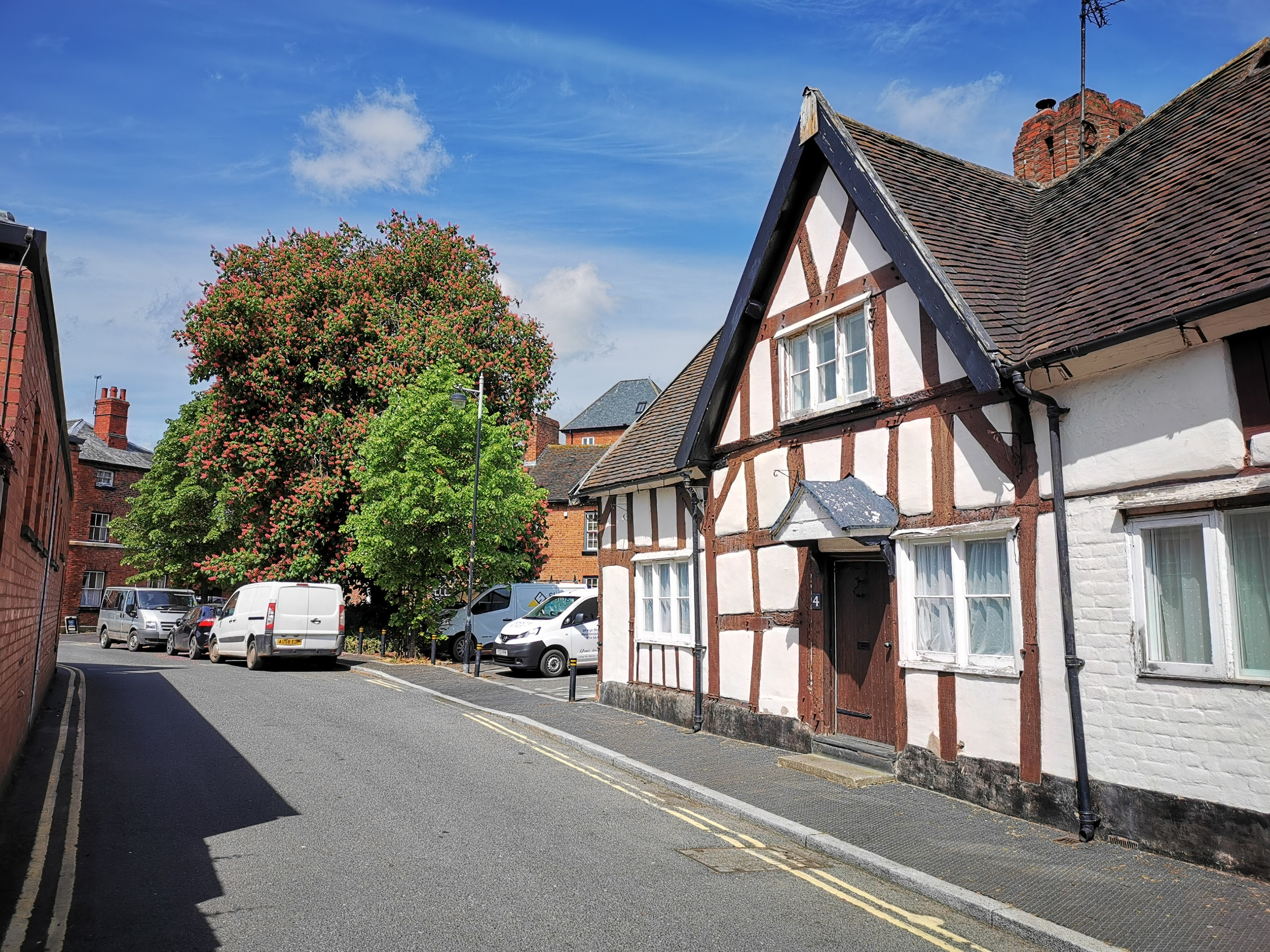
- Top: Wem High Street Bottom: The Old Wem Mill (left), Nobel Street (right),

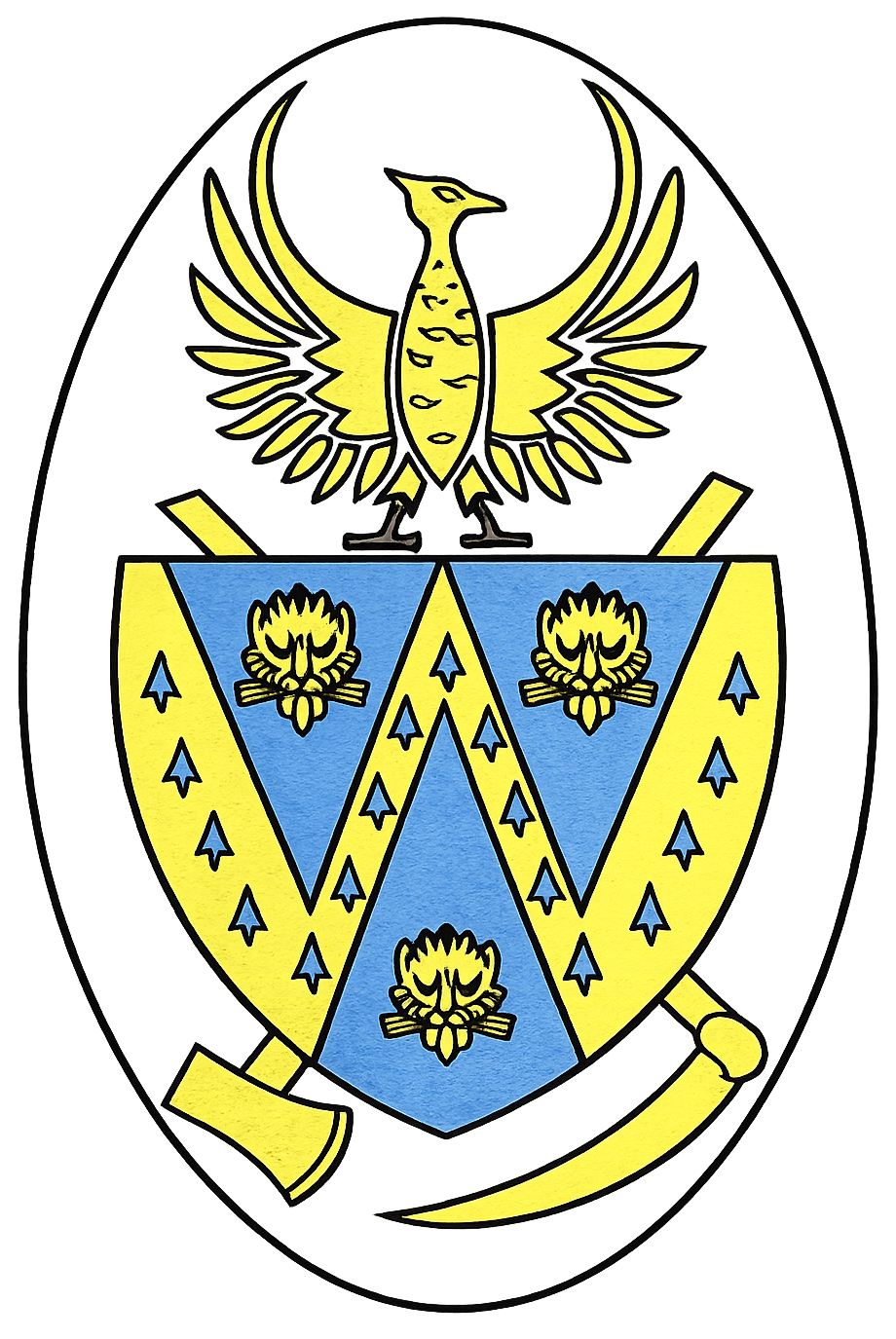
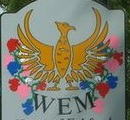
- Coat of arms Emblem

- Wem shown within Shropshire and England
- Coordinates: 52.8536°N 2.7267°W
- Sovereign state: United Kingdom
- Constituent country: England
- Region: West Midlands
- Ceremonial county: Shropshire
- Local government: Shropshire
- Website: Wem Town Council
- Norman Castle Town planned: c. 1066
- Market charter granted: 1202
- Seat: Edinburgh House

Government
  - Type: Town council
  - Governing body: Wem Town Council
  - UK Parliament: North Shropshire

Area
  - Total: 1.41 sq mi (3.66 km^{2})
- Elevation: 269 ft (82 m)

Population
  - Total: 6,100
- Demonym: Wemian
- Time zone: GMT
  - Summer (DST): BST
- Post code: SY4
- Area code: 01939
- Police force: West Mercia Police
- Fire service: Shropshire Fire
- Ambulance service: West Midlands
- Website: https://www.wem.gov.uk/

Wem is a market town in the civil parish of Wem Urban, in Shropshire, England, 9 miles (14 km) north of Shrewsbury and 9 miles (14 km) south of Whitchurch.

The name is derived from the Old English term wamm, meaning "marsh".

As a caput of a barony and a large manor and parish Wem was a centre for justice and local government for centuries, and the headquarters of the North Shropshire District Council until Shropshire became a unitary authority. From the 12th century revisions to the hundreds of Shropshire, Wem was within the North Division of Bradford Hundred until the end of the 19th century.

It is considered that the landscape around the town may be the inspiration for Shakespeare's play As You Like It, a belief reflected in cultural programming in the town.

== History ==
=== Prehistory and Roman era ===
The area now known as Wem is believed to have been settled prior to the Roman Conquest of Britain, by the Cornovii, Celtic Iron Age settlers: there is an Iron Age hillfort at nearby Bury Walls occupied over into the Roman period, and the Roman Road from Uriconium to Deva Victrix ran close by to the east at Soulton.

It is understood a lost Roman camp may have been in the area, called Rutunium.

=== Post-Roman period ===
The Wem Hoard, a collection of coins deposited in the post-Roman period, was found in land in the Wem area in 2019.

Arms of the Arden family - this ancient family held land at Wem before the Norman Conquest

The Arden family owned the manor of Wem prior to the Conquest.

=== Norman and late medieval periods ===
Weme was an Anglo-Saxon estate, which transitioned into a planned Norman castle-town established after the conquest, with motte-and-bailey castle, parish church and burgage plots. The town is recorded in the Domesday Book of 1086 as consisting of four manors in the hundred of Hodnet.

At Domesday the town comprised:

- Households: 4 villagers. 8 smallholders. 2 slaves.
- Land and resources: ploughland: 8 ploughlands. 1 lord's plough teams. 1 men's plough teams.
- Other resources: woodland 100 pigs.

with an annual value to lord: 2 pounds in 1086; up to 1 pound 7 shillings in 1066.

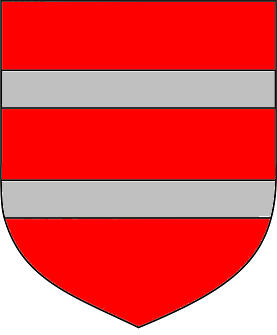
The arms of Guillaume Pantol/William Pantulf, first Lords of Wem after the Conquest

The Domesday Book records that Wem was held by William Pantulf (Guillaume Pantol in French) and is its first known Lord. Orderic Vitalis described Pantulf as:

kind to the poor, to whom he was liberal in alms, he was firm in prosperity and adversity, put down all his enemies, and exercised great power through his wealth and possessions.

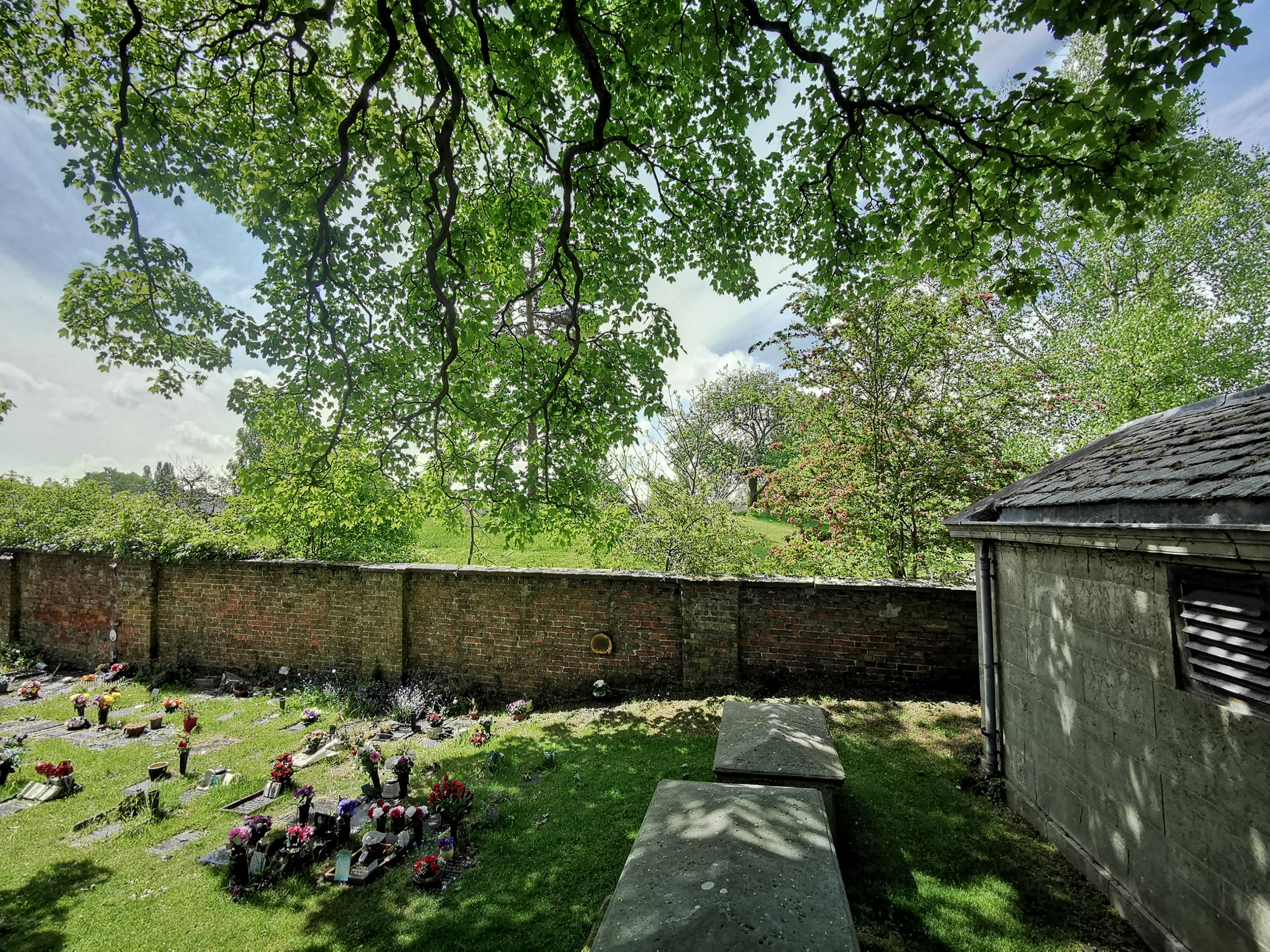
Site of Wem Castle Mound, seen from the church yard

Stafford Castle and Wem were granted to him with a further 28 manors in the area bounded by Clive, Ellesmere, Tilley and Cresswell, with some of the manors within this area belonging to other lords (Prees to the Bishop of Lichfield, and Soulton to the King's Chapel in Shrewsbury Castle, for example).

Pantulf refused to participate in an 1102 rebellion against King Henry I led by Robert de Belesme and assisted the crown defeating it, by marching with the king on Shrewsbury, during which the roads in the area were found to be bad, thickly wooded, providing cover for archers: 6000 foot soldiers cut down the woods and opened up the roads. Hugo Pantulf, a descendant of William, was Baron of Wem in the mid 1100s: he attended the court of Richard the Lion Heart, was Sheriff of Shropshire, and likely attended the Crusades with the king, certainly paying scutage to towards his ransom.

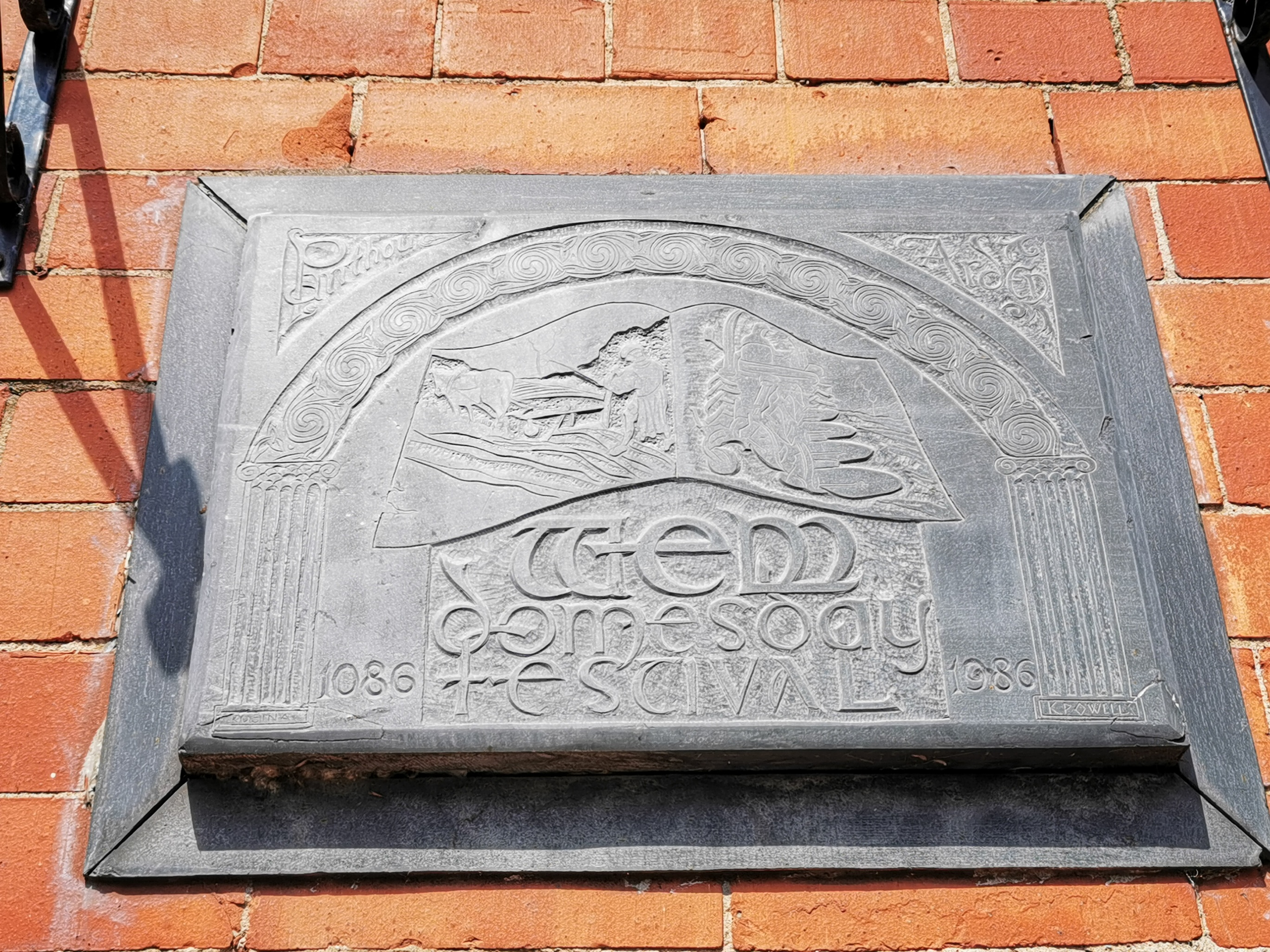
Tablet on Wem Town Hall marking the 900th anniversary of the Domesday Book in 1986: noting the Plantho and Arden family links to the town

In 1986, the BBC's national celebrations for the 900th anniversary of the Domesday Book focused on the town of Wem. This was because Wem was unique in having direct, unbroken male-line descendants of both its pre- and post-Conquest Manorial Lords: Pierre de Panthou and Dr. George Arden. The respective heirs were brought to the town for a special event, which was recorded for television and presented by historian Michael Wood.

The Norman town was probably enclosed by an earthwork: there is a record from the lord's steward of repairs to the town's enclosure in 1410, in which year the town had been "totally burnt and wasted by the Welsh rebels". There is some speculation that the town had walls by the 1400s, as Samuel Garbet recorded an annotation to Fabyan's Chronicle that Wem "was totally burnt to the ground, with its walls and castle" in the reign of Henry VI.

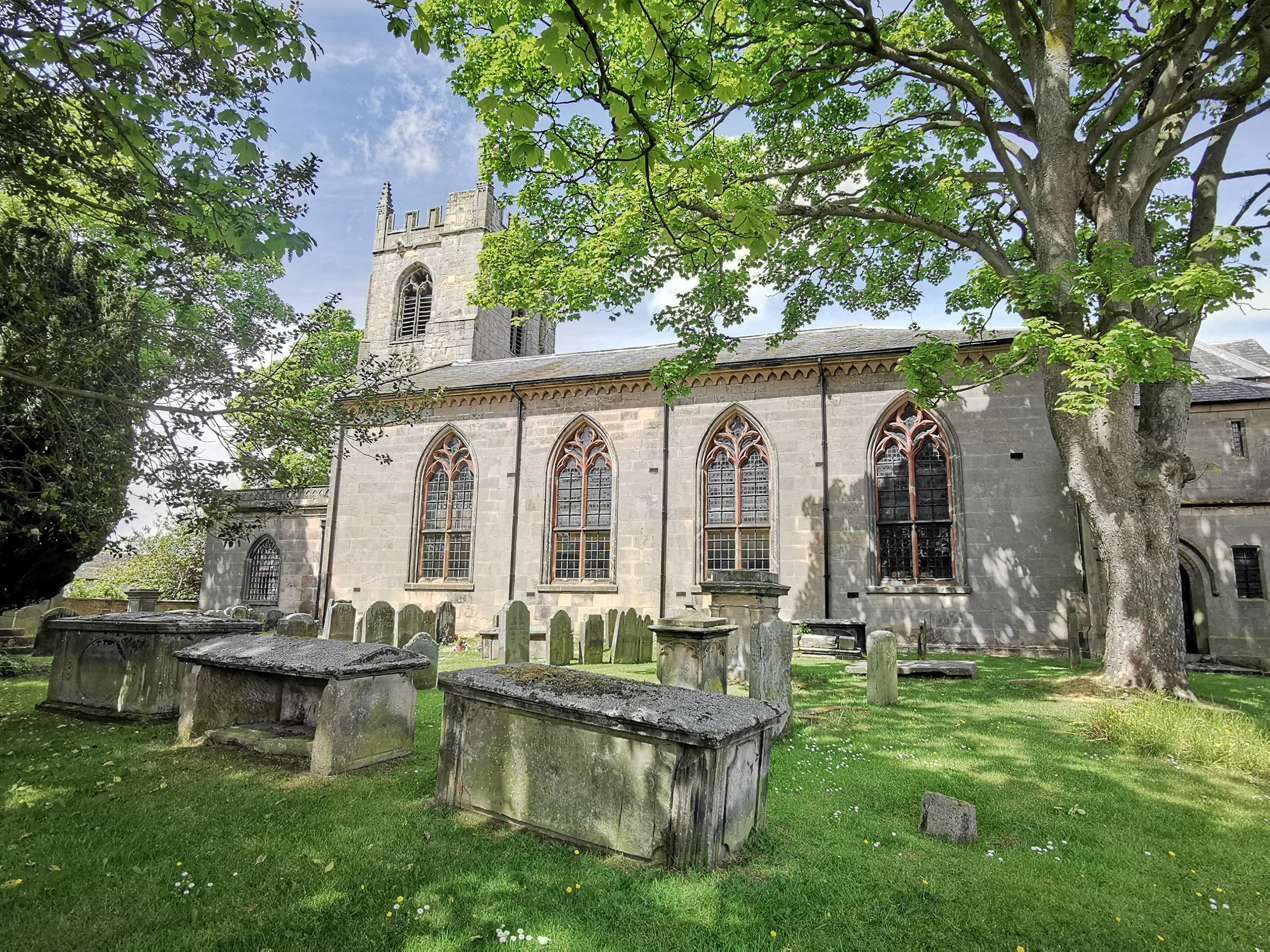
Wem's main church is the Anglican Parish Church of St. Peter and St. Paul.

The supposed route of the walls or earthworks follows Noble Street, Wem Brook, the Roden and crossing the High Street between Leek Street and Chapel Street.

There were bars at the three entrances to the town, and a 1514 record exists of four men being employed to keep the bars on market days.

There is some thought that a market was held from the days of Pantuf, but King John certainly granted a charter in 1202. Initially, the permission was for a Sunday market. This was subsequently revised, in 1351, to a Thursday: this followed a decree of the Archbishop of Canterbury, Simon Islip in the reign of Edward III that Sunday markets were banned. Wem's market day remains Thursday to this day.

The manor was held by some of the great baronial families: including the Earls of Arundel, and the Lords Dacre, Bradford and Barnard and, after the 14th century the lord of the manor was not resident.

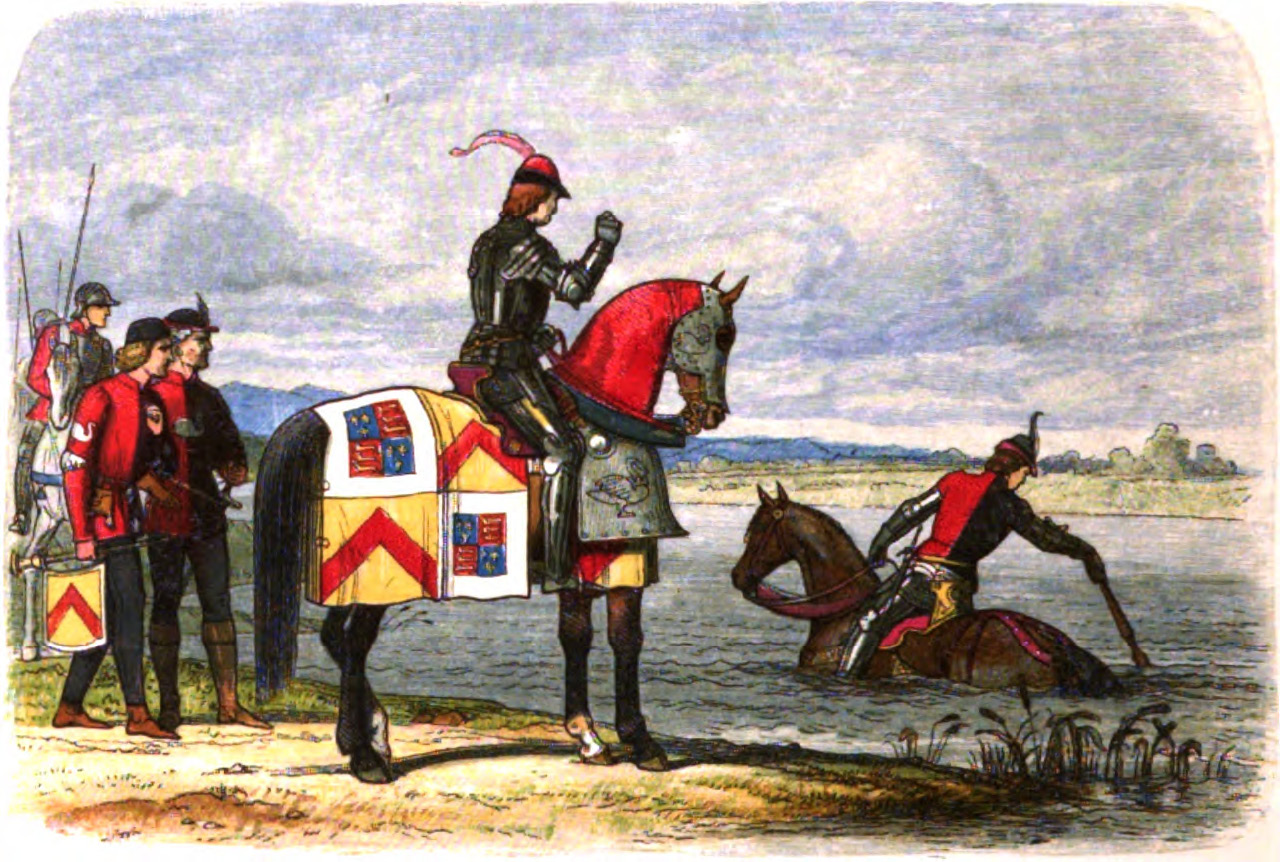
2nd Duke of Buckingham, leader of Buckingham's Rebellion finds the River Severn swollen. Shortly after this his army deserts, and he flees to Wem, where he is apprehended at Lacon dressed as a peasant and digging a ditch.

During the course of 1483, Henry Stafford, 2nd Duke of Buckingham (linked by some historians with the murder of the Princes in the Tower), was engaged in rebellion against Richard III with Henry Tudor. By October of that year Buckingham's army were in the Hereford area, and fighting for survival and the campaign was unravelling in deteriorating weather; Buckingham's army deserted. Disguised as a simple labourer he fled north to Shropshire and went into hiding at Lacon Hall, the house of a local retainer, Ralph Bannister who betrayed him for £1000.

An account of the capture of the Duke is as follows:

"he was disguised and digging a ditch at the time of his arrest; and on the approach of Thomas Mytton the sheriff, who came to apprehend him, he knelt down in the orchard wherein he was taken, and solemnly imprecated vengeance upon the traitor and his posterity, which curses are said to have been signally fulfilled...shortlie after [Bannister] had betrayed the duke his master, his sonne and heyre waxed mad, and so dyed in a bore's stye: his eldest daughter, of excellent beautie, was sodainly stricken with a foule leperye; his second sonne very marvellously deformed of his limmes and made decrepit; his younger sonne in a small puddel was strangled and drowned; and he, being of extreme age, arraigned and found gyltie of a murder, and by his clergye saved: And as for his thousand pounds, kyng Richard gave him not one farthing, howbeit some say he had a small office or a ferme to stop his mouth."

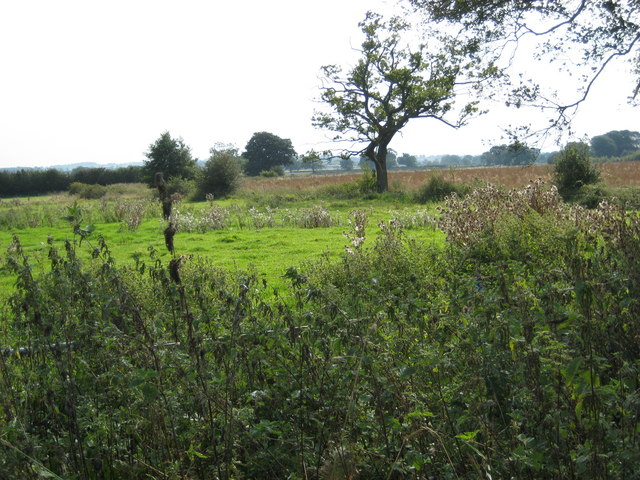
Land at Lacon: site of the betrayal and arrest of the 2nd Duke of Buckingham in the conflicts that brought the Tudors to the throne of England

Buckingham was subsequently tried, convicted and executed for treason at Salisbury.

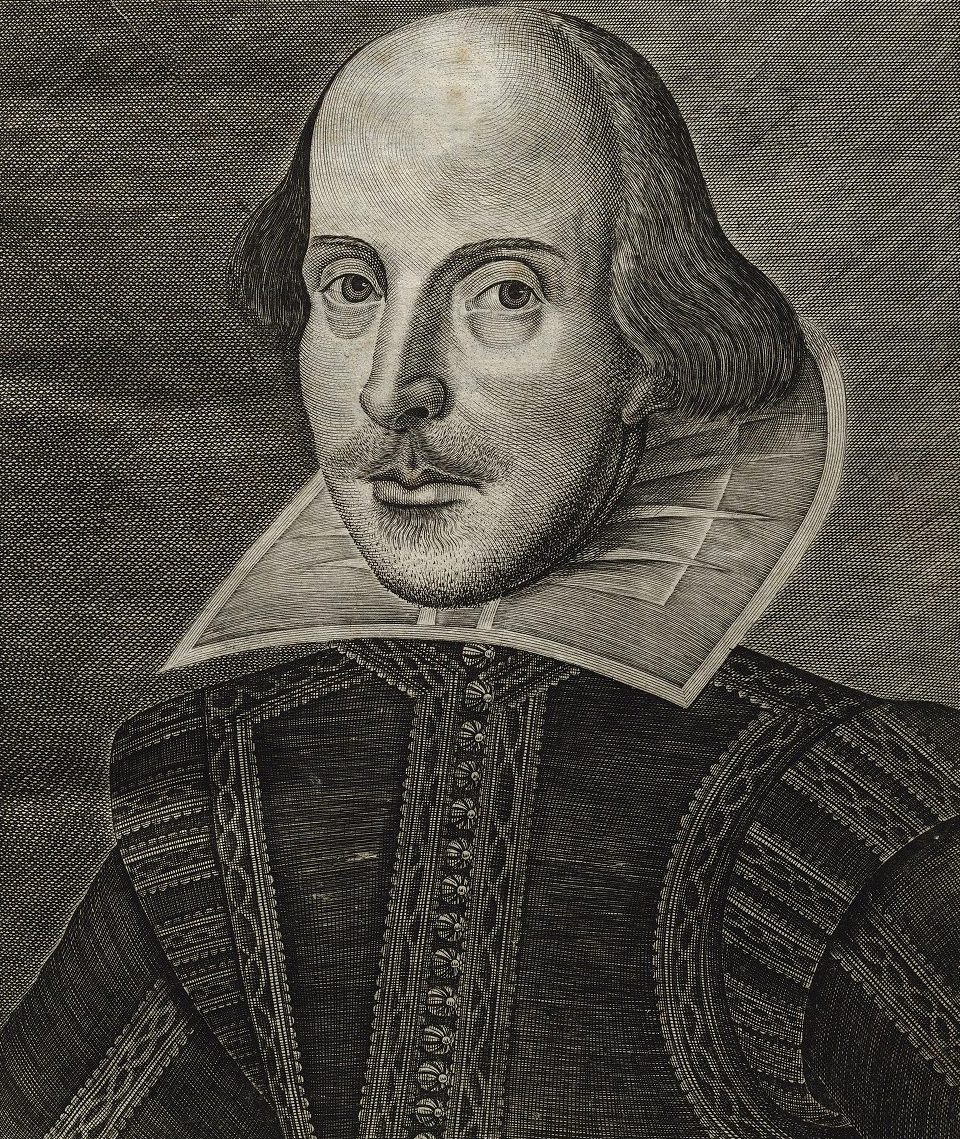
Shakespeare makes reference to an incident on the outskirts of Wem in Richard III.

This incident is referred to by William Shakespeare in the play Richard III, in Act IV, scene iv:

Third Messenger

The news I have to tell your majesty

Is, that by sudden floods and fall of waters, Buckingham's army is dispersed and scatter'd; And he himself wander'd away alone, No man knows whither.

KING RICHARD III

I cry thee mercy:

There is my purse to cure that blow of thine. Hath any well-advised friend proclaim'd

Reward to him that brings the traitor in?

Large common fields farmed in strips lay outside the town walls: Pool Meadows (waste ground by the river within the lord's demesne); Cross Field (lying toward Soulton, and thought to have been named for a wayside cross); Middle Field (part of which was later known as Leper Middle Field, giving an insight into medieval life); and Chapel Field (named after a chapel of ease on the Horton Road dedicated to St John which was suppressed in 1548). There was a Manorial Court House at Wem in which a twice yearly Court leet with the grim privilege of a gallows, hearing pleas including hue-and-cry, bloodshed.

=== Tudor period ===
In Henry VIII's reign Lord Dacre (d. 1563) began to fell Northwood, a task completed by the Countess of Arundel (d. 1630), his grand-daughter. Dacre also drained the Old Pool, work again completed by his grand-daughter.

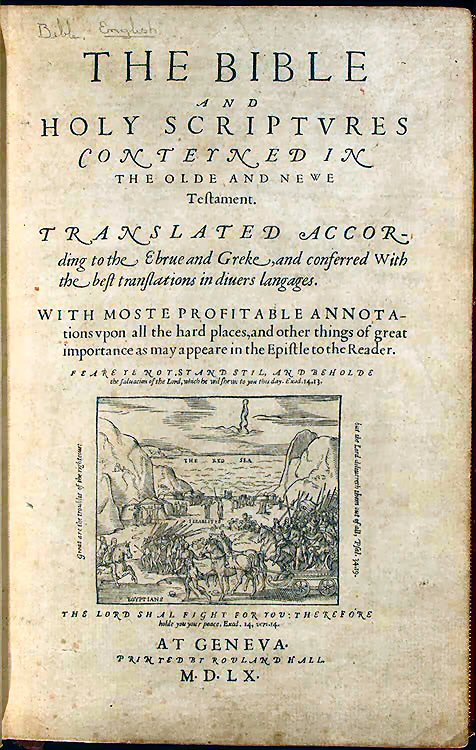
Frontispiece of the 1560 Geneva Bible, the headquarters of the publisher were just outside Wem

During the 1550s Sir Rowland Hill ("Old Sir Rowland") publisher of the Geneva Bible, built a headquarters at Soulton Hall, ranging over to Hawkstone Park where his activities are thought to have provided some of the inspiration for Shakespeare's play As You Like It. Certainly, "Old Sir Rowland" bought both of those manors from Sir Thomas Lodge, father of Thomas Lodge, the acknowledged author of the source text.

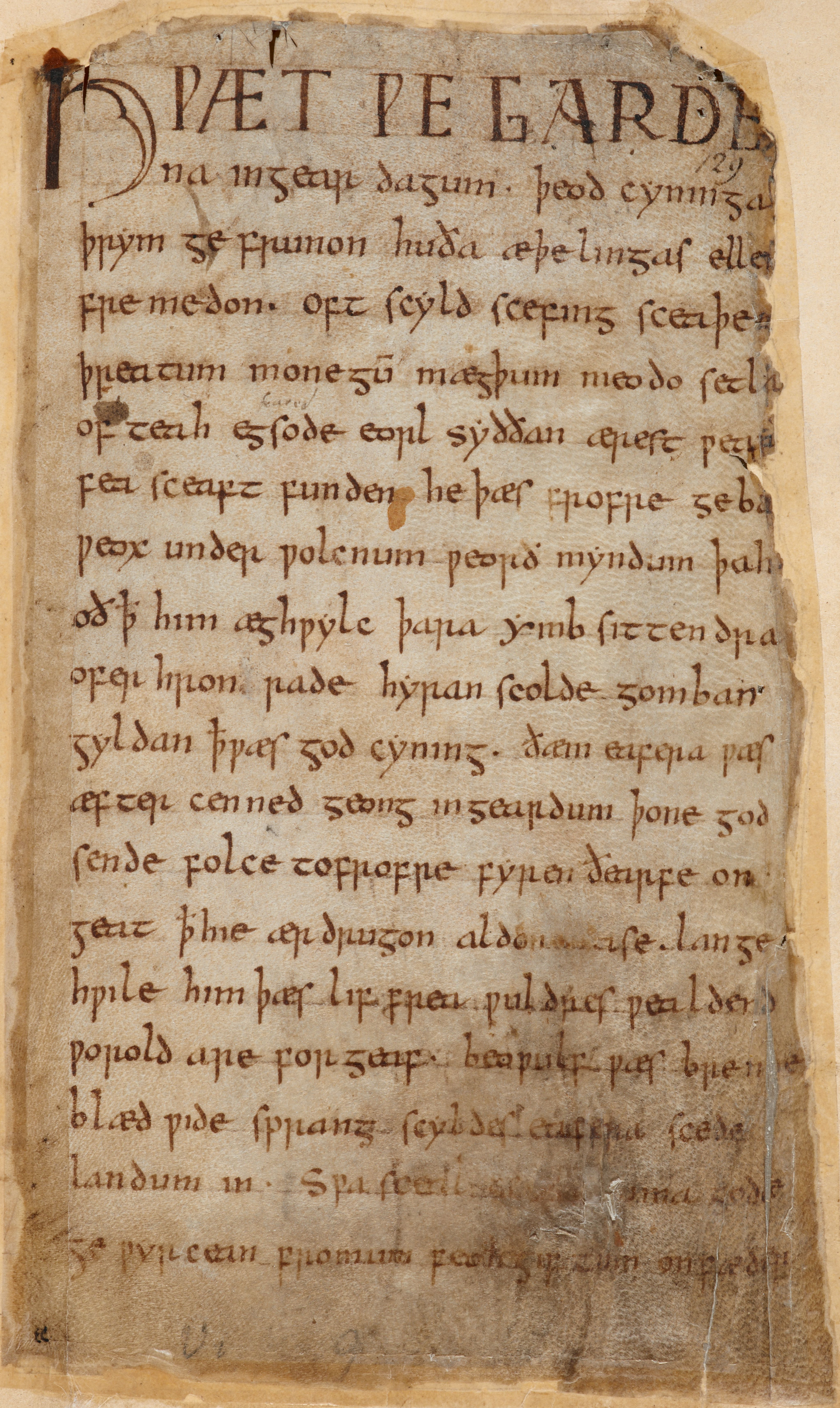
The Cotton family, who came to hold the only copy of Beowulf and several copies of Magna Carta, and much other important early document material originate in the Wem area

Another important connection of antiquarian note is that the Cotton family, who came to hold the Cotton Library (a foundational collection of the British Library, including the Beowulf manuscript and copies of Magna Carta) originated in the Wem area and by the sixteenth century had the manor at Alkington nearby, members of this family were early patrons of Inigo Jones at Norton-in-Hales.

By 1561 the former castle enclosure was held at will by the rector, John Dacre. Manor perquisites noted in 1589 show that there were two annual fairs where the lord took a toll on all goods worth above 12d. sold by strangers and tenants (but not burgagers) and the profits of the courts. In 1579 the lord's steward ruled that there should not be more than five alehouses in the township; however, unlicensed brewers were not prevented and were fined in number at each court leet.

=== 1600s ===
==== Civil war ====
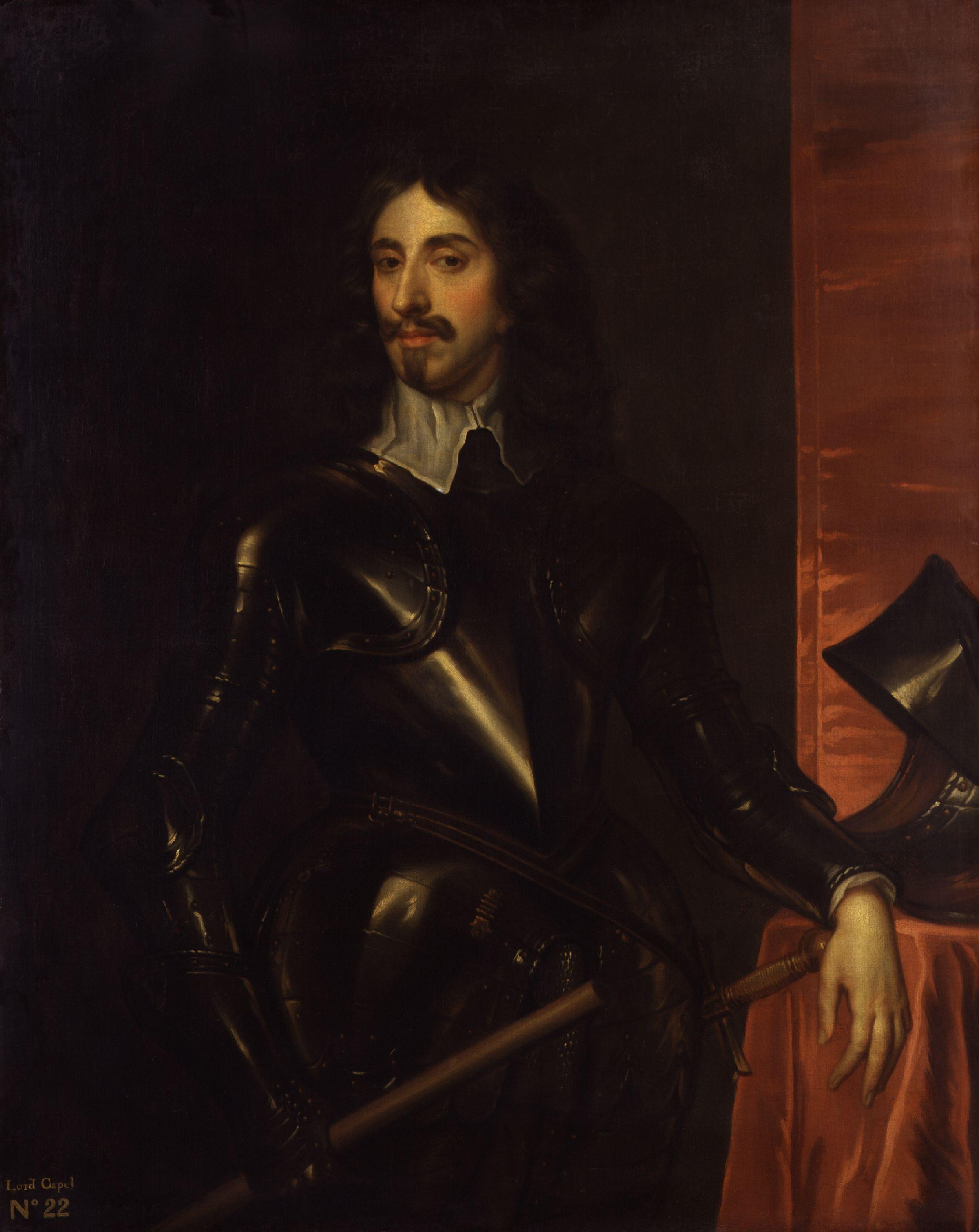
Lord Capel, who commanded a failed attempt to take Wem when it declared early for Parliament in the Civil War

In early 1642 Royalists were staying in Wem.

In September 1642, during the English Civil War Charles I passed close by Wem en route from Chester to Shrewsbury at the invitation of the corporation of the latter town where he made a temporary capital, taking the route via Soulton and Lee Brockhurst which corresponds to the old Roman Road.

However, in September 1643, the town was planted with a Parliamentarian garrison.

Under the supervision of Sir William Brereton a broad ditch four yards deep and wide and rampart, strengthened by a palisade made from timber cut from a felled 50 acre wood at Loppington was thrown up around the town to fortify it (some traces of this survive in the town). The route of this fortification was as follows: it began at a wooden tower on Soulton Road, just beyond the present station, from there it ran to "Shrewsbury Gate" crossing Well Walk and the bottom of Roden House garden; it than ran to the "Ellesmere Gate" where the stream crossed road; the earthworks continued along the back of Noble Street to "Whitchurch Gate"; on from there to "Drayton Gate" at 18 Aston Street and then back to the wooden tower. Many of the buildings beyond this rampart were destroyed in fortifying the town, to prevent them being of use to attackers.

In October, 1643 Lord Capell, was dispatched by the Royalists to the area to seek to retake Wem. H. Pickering (who served under Lord Capel) writing to the Duchess of Beaufort sets out the engagement as follows:

3 cannon, 2 drakes, one great mortarpiece that carried a 30ln. bullet, had 120 odd wagons and carriages laden with bread, biskett, bare and other provisions and theire armye being formydable as consistynge of neer 5,000.

Wem was not ready for the attack: the walls were not finished, the gates were not hinged, some of the guns on the ramparts were wooden dummies and the defending force consisted of only 40 male Parliamentarians; but then the local women rallied round positioning themselves in red coats in well chosen spots to mislead the Royalists.

On 17–18 October 1643 Royalist attackers formed up on one side, approaching Wem only from Soulton Road. The commander, Lord Capel, lightheartedly smoking his pipe half a mile from the town on that road. The town was not taken and the manoeuvre lasted less than a day resulting in this couplet:

The women of Wem and a few musketeers. Beat the Lord Capel and all his Cavaliers.

It has been suggested that Sir Rowland Hill's statecraft involved the accumulation of state papers and culturally important texts at Soulton, which then passed, via the Alkington Cottons into the Cotton Library, which includes the Beowulf manuscript and copies of Magna Carta, and this offers a potential explanation for the battle of Wem in the English Civil War during which Soulton was ransacked. After this incident it is further recorded the houses of the neighbouring seat(s) of the Royalist Hill family, at Soulton and possibly Hawkstone "[were] pillaged, and ransacked by the rebel [parliamentarians]", and after this that family had to go into hiding in the Hawkstone landscape and caves.

Brereton's report claimed Royalist losses in the Wem engagement were heavy.

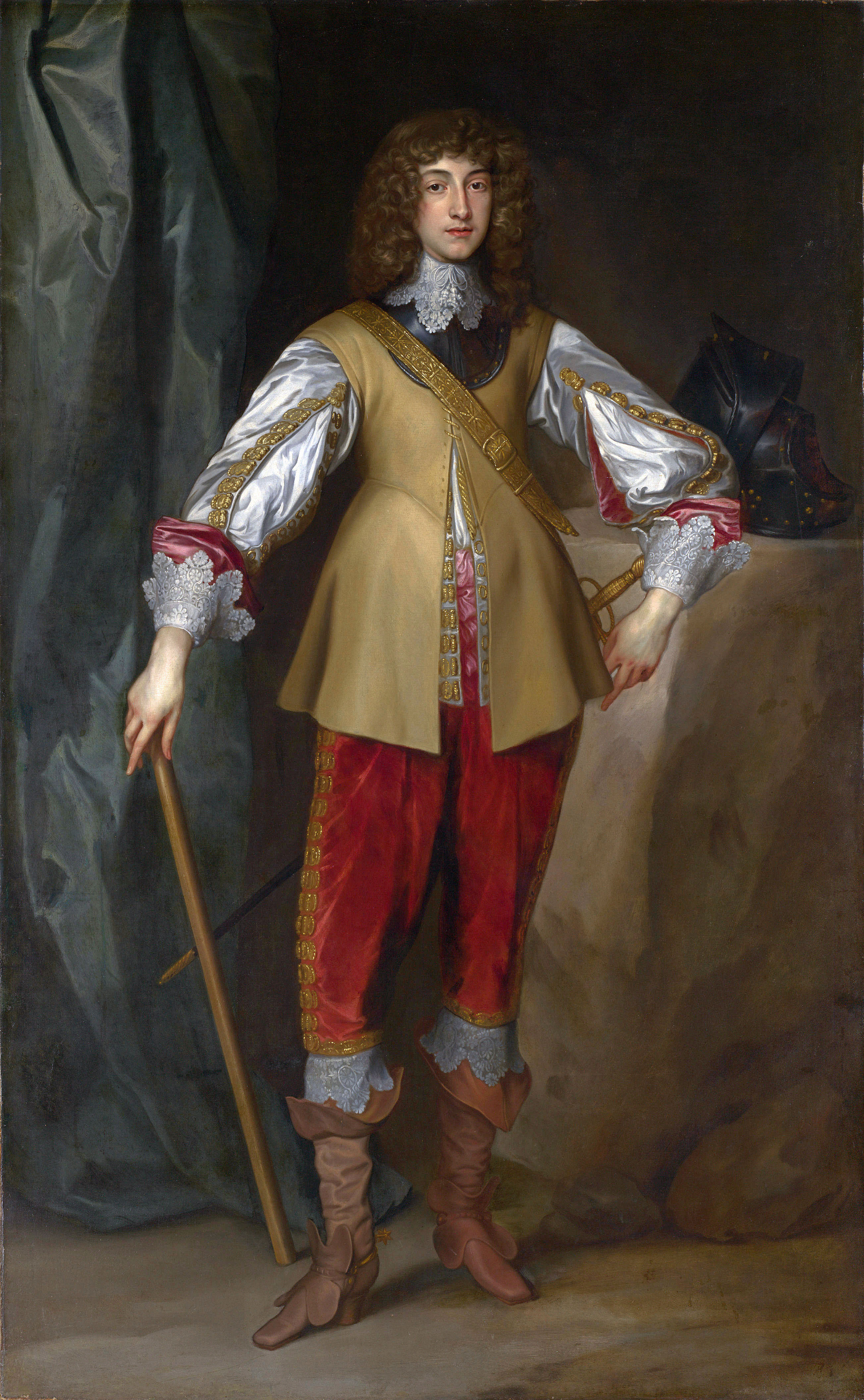
Prince Rupert spent the early phases of the English Civil War in the area around Wem.

Prince Rupert came to the district on 18 February 1644, was welcomed by Shrewsbury's aldermen and made Shrewsbury his headquarters. Shortly afterwards he passed by Wem to the west and remarked of it:

It was a crow's nest that would not afford each of his men a piece of bread.

Prince Rupert also mustered troops a short distance to the east at nearby Prees Heath.

Wem was the seat of the Shropshire Committee until the fall of Royalist Shrewsbury in 1645.

The sword of a Cromwellian trooper was dug up at Wem in 1923, and a cannonball of the same period was found during construction work at the Grammar School.

==== Restoration ====
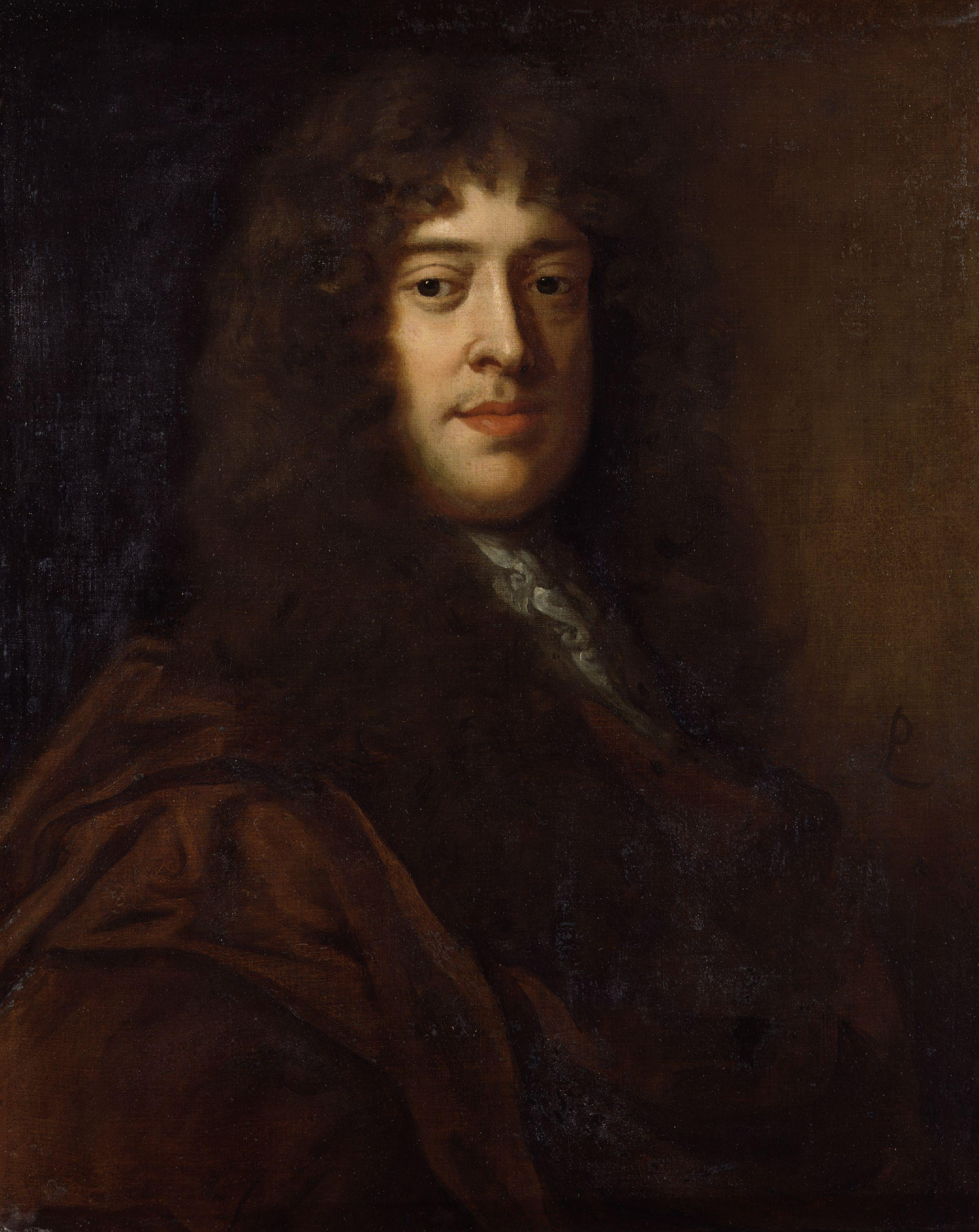
William Wycherley, the Restoration dramatist was brought up in the Wem area.

In 1648 Hinstock, Loppington, and Wem were assessed for sale, and lands were sold from the manorial holdings throughout the 1650s. By 1665, when Daniel Wycherley bought the manor, the manorial property was much reduced from the holding it had been in 1648.

Dramatist William Wycherley, Daniel's son, was born at Clive near Shrewsbury, although his birthplace has been said (by Lionel Cust) to be Trench Farm to the north nearer Wem that was later birthplace of another writer, John Ireland, who was said to have been adopted by Wycherley's widow following the death of Ireland's parents. Wem was held by Judge Jeffreys (1645–1689), who had bought the manor from Daniel Wycherley and became known as the "hanging judge" for his willingness to impose capital punishment on supporters of the Duke of Monmouth. His seat was Lowe Hall at The Lowe, Wem. In 1685 he was made Baron Jeffreys of Wem.

==== Great Fire of Wem ====
On 3 March 1677, a fire destroyed many of the wooden buildings in the town, the event came to be known as the "Great Fire of Wem". Jane Churn (or Churm) dropped a candle, which started a huge fire. The intense heat partly melted the church bells, which had to be recast. A contemporary account of this disaster was as follows:

This dreadful fire began on Saturday, between seven and eight o'clock, at a small house near the upper end of Leek-lane, which stood on the same ground which Mr. Phillips's brewhouse now stands. It was occasioned by the carelessness of a girl, about fourteen years of age, called, Jane Churm, who went up stairs to fetch some fuel kept under a bed, in order to make a good fire against the return of her sister, Catharine Morris, of the New-street, who was washing linen at Oliver's well, The inconsiderate girl whilst she was gathering the sticks together, stuck her candle in a twig that encompassed a spar, when catching the thatch, it set the house in flames; which being agitated by a violent tempestuous wind, soon defied all human means to extinguish them. It was a very dry season, and the houses were covered with straw, or shingles, so that the fire spread into several streets, and with such rapidity seized house after house, that in a short time the conflagration became general. A strong easterly wind blew the burning thatch and shingles to a vast distance, and the devouring flames ran along the High-street, Cripple-street, and the Horse Fair, consuming every edifice, the free school only excepted, as far as Burton's pit, or the house of George Groom, when on a sudden the wind turned to the south-west, and carried the raging fire through the Noble-street as far as the Draw-well house. A great number of country people were now come in, who offered to assist Mr. Higginson in carrying out his goods, but he would not suffer any to be removed, being intent on the preservation of his house.

His barns and out-buildings were on fire, and the flames caught the pinnacle, the weather boards, and the shingles of his house, but by the care, and activity of the people in pouring out water, and casting off the shingles, an entire stop was put to time fire on that side, but on the other it ran the full length of the street. In the High-street the fire spread eastwards to the same point on the north side; on the opposite no farther than the same place where it began. In the Mill-street it extended to the Rector's barns; in Leek-lane to the house of William Smith, late of John Hales. The church, the steeple, the market house, and seven score dwelling houses, besides treble the number of out-houses and buildings were burnt. In the space of one hour they were all on fire, and the blaze was so great, that at the distance of eight or nine miles it seemed very near, and gave almost as great a light as the moon in full. In the town was a scene of the greatest confusion, and horror. The wind blustered, the flames roared, women and children shrieked. People ran at the cry of fire, to the place where it began, and at their return found their own dwellings burning. In the streets they were scorched with excessive heat, in the fields they were ready to perish with cold. Some striving to save their houses, with them lost all their goods, others despairing to extinguish the flames, attempted to carry off their most valuable effects, and many lost by thieves what they had saved from the fire; one man, and several cattle were consumed in the flames. The man was Richard Sherratt, a shoemaker, who lived on that ground where Sarah Jones now does. Having fetched a parcel of shoes out of his shop, he was seen to go under the market house, which is supposed to have fallen on him.

An estimate being taken of the buildings, and the value of the goods consumed by fire, it was computed that the buildings were worth £14,760. l0s. and the household goods £8,916. 13s. 1d, so that the whole loss amounted to about £23,677. 3s. 1d. for which a brief was obtained, dated the 31st of May, 1677.

A contemporary response to the disaster was written by Andrew Parsons, called Seasonable counsel to an afflicted people in a letter to the distressed inhabitants of Wem in the county of Salop, after the dreadful fire, which consumed that market-town, March 3. 1676, part of it read as follows:

...how could I be otherwise affected than Nehemiah was, Chap. 1.4, when he heard Jerusalem lay waste and burnt? He was astonished, wept and prayed to the God of Heaven. ...Wem would be built again, as Jerusalem was; the glory of whose second Temple exceeded that of the first, as did also their own Houses and habitations.. But is Wem burnt indeed? What, Wem! the place that God hath blessed, and where he hath as signally manifested hispower, goodness, forbearance, and mercy, as in any place you or I ever knew? And is this lot and fate at last befallen Wem?

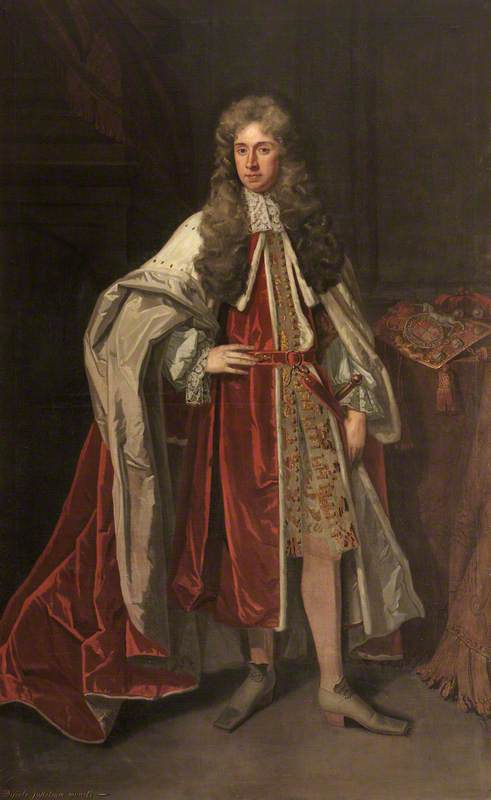
Judge Jeffreys held the barony of Wem.

The King, Charles II, gave a commission to Thomas Hill of Soulton to receive and distribute the funds for the relief effort.

=== 1700s ===
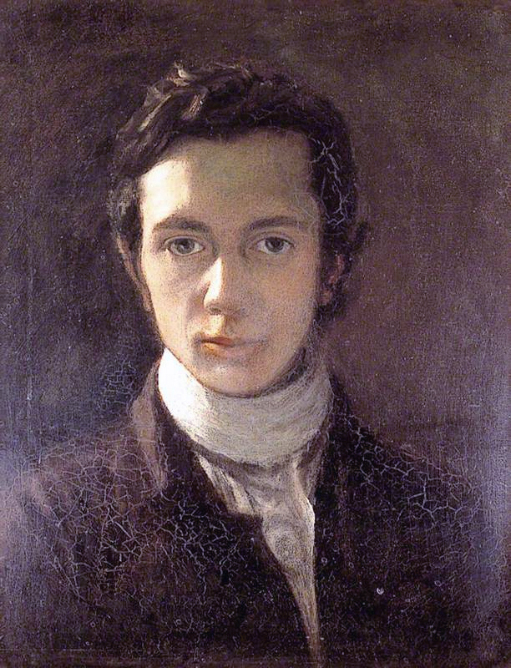
William Hazlitt

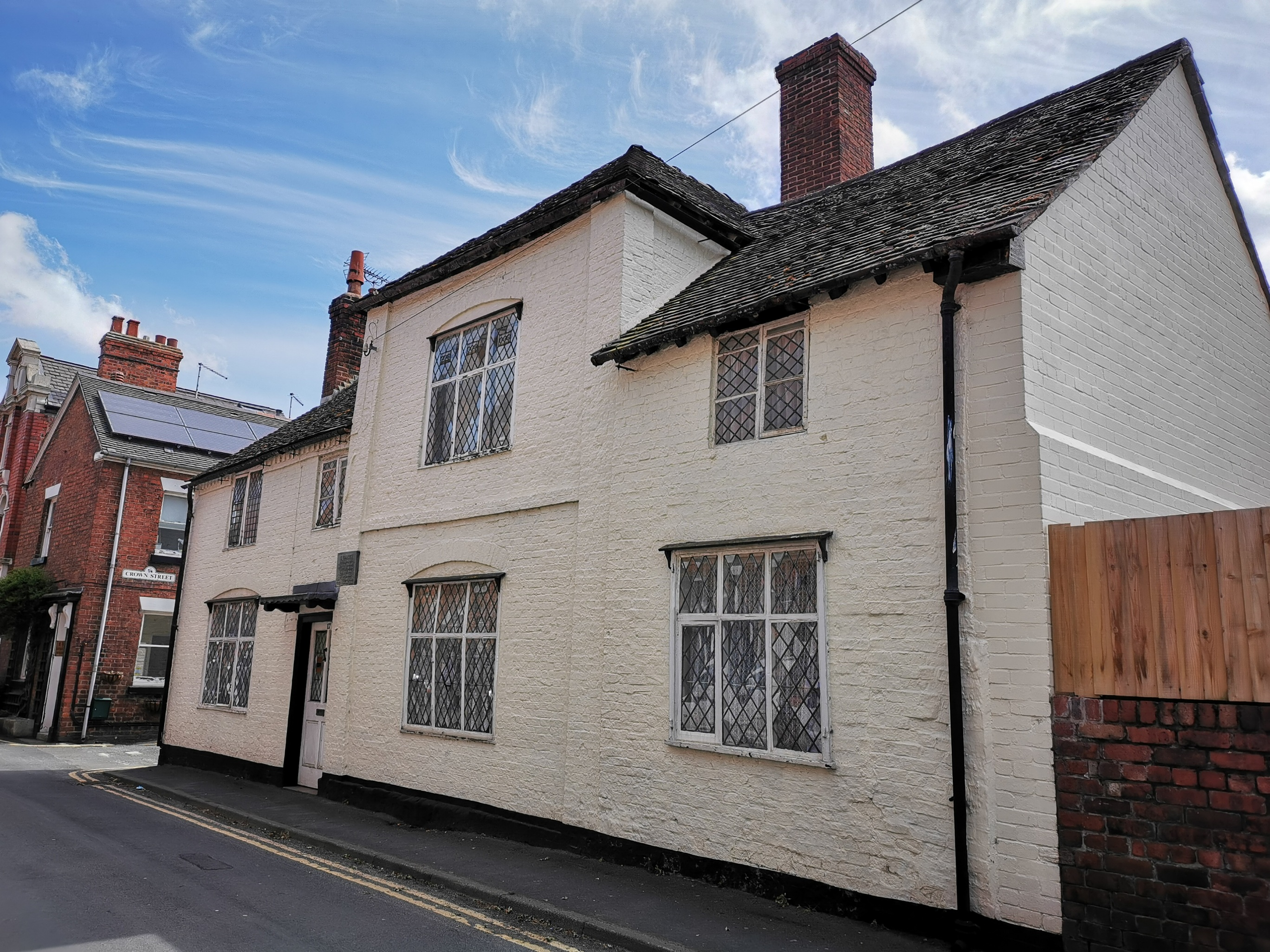
House in Wem where William Hazlitt and his father lived in the late eighteenth century

By 1740 a workhouse existed in Wem, by 1777 it could house 20 inmates. During this period, the Old Town Hall, while still the Town Hall, was used for sittings of the County Court. The farming in this period saw an emphasis on dairy and grains. Other specializations included linen cloth.

The town was the childhood home of one of England's greatest essayists and critics, William Hazlitt (1778–1830). Hazlitt's father moved their family there when William was just a child. Hazlitt senior became the Unitarian Minister in the town occupying a building on Noble Street that still stands. In 2008 the town held a 230th Anniversary Celebration of Hazlitt's Life and work for five days, hosted by author Edouard d'Araille who gave series of talks and conference about 'William of Wem'. William Hazlitt moved away from Wem in later life and ultimately died in London.

Artist John Astley, writer John Ireland, and pugilist Joe Berks all also grew up in the town.

=== Victorian period ===
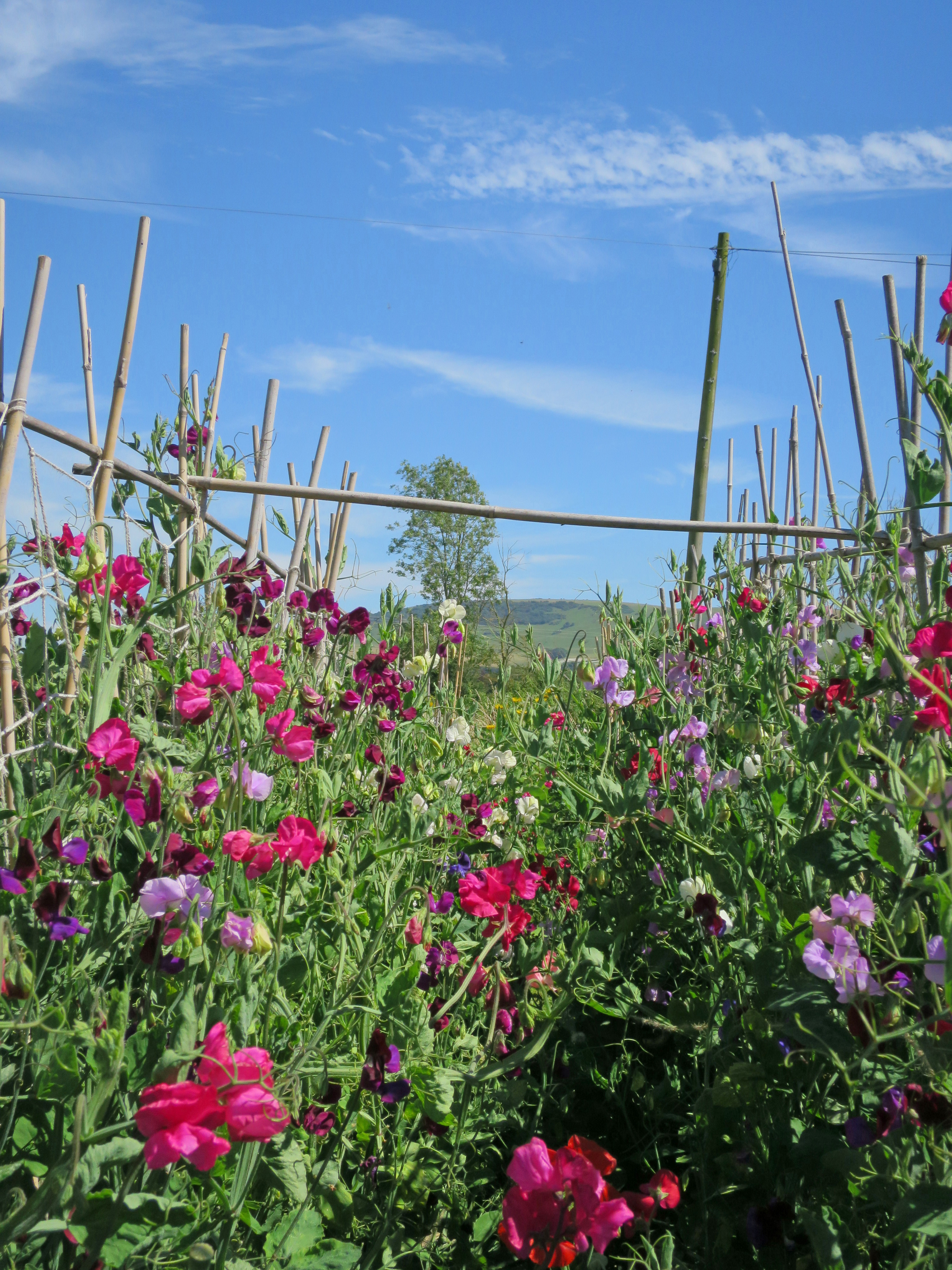
The modern sweet pea was developed in Wem.

In the era of the stagecoach the town was served by two: 'The Hero' called at the Castle and the Union Stagecoach at the White Lion.

Within the town the sweet pea was first commercially cultivated, under the variety named Eckford Sweet Pea, after its inventor, nursery-man Henry Eckford. He first introduced a variety of the sweet pea in 1882, and set up in Wem in 1888, developing and producing many more varieties.

There is a road to signify the Eckford name, called Eckford Park (within Wem). Each year, the Eckford Sweet Pea Society of Wem have held a sweet pea festival apart from the years 2020 and 2021. In Victorian times, the town was known as "Wem, where the sweet peas grow".

=== 20th century ===
Several public buildings built in the early 20th century used the Arts and Crafts style: the Morgan Library building, the old post office and the current town hall building are examples.

==== First World War ====
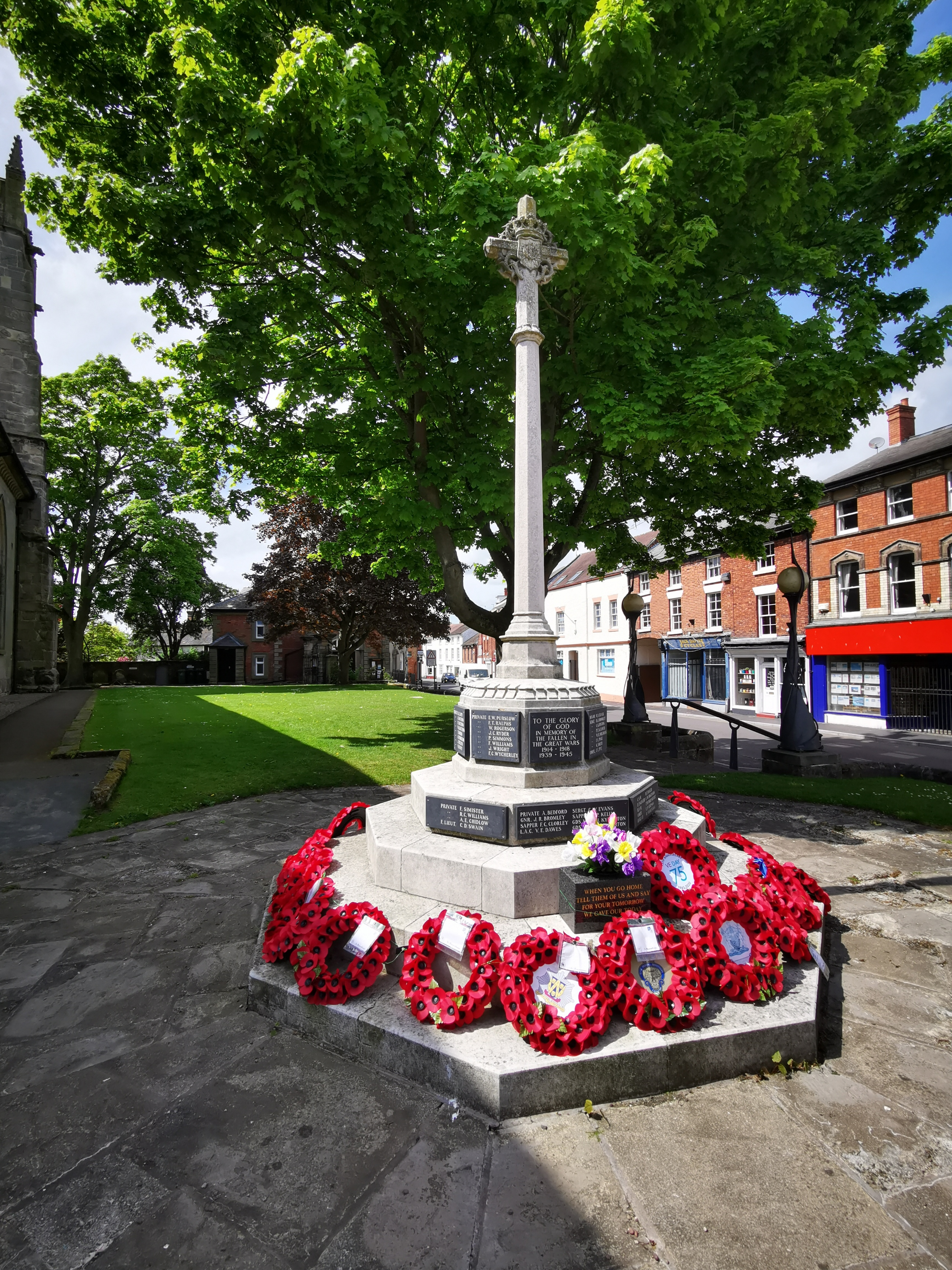
The War Memorial in Wem

Fifty-five men of Wem are recorded as having fallen serving their country in the First World War. The town's war memorial was dedicated in 1920.

==== Second World War ====
In 1940 Anna Essinger (1879–1960), a German Jewish educator, evacuated her boarding school, Bunce Court School from Otterden, in Kent to Trench Hall, near Wem. She facilitated Kindertransport.

The US Army created a storage facility at Aston Park estate on 14 December 1942. The facility was later converted to a prisoner of war camp, and was used for that purpose until 1948.

Nineteen men of Wem are recorded to have died serving in the Second World War.

==== After the war ====
Wem was struck by an F1/T2 tornado on 23 November 1981, as part of the record-breaking nationwide tornado outbreak on that day.

In November 1995 the town hall suffered a catastrophic fire. It reopened after repair, renewal, and redesign in 2000.

=== 21st century ===
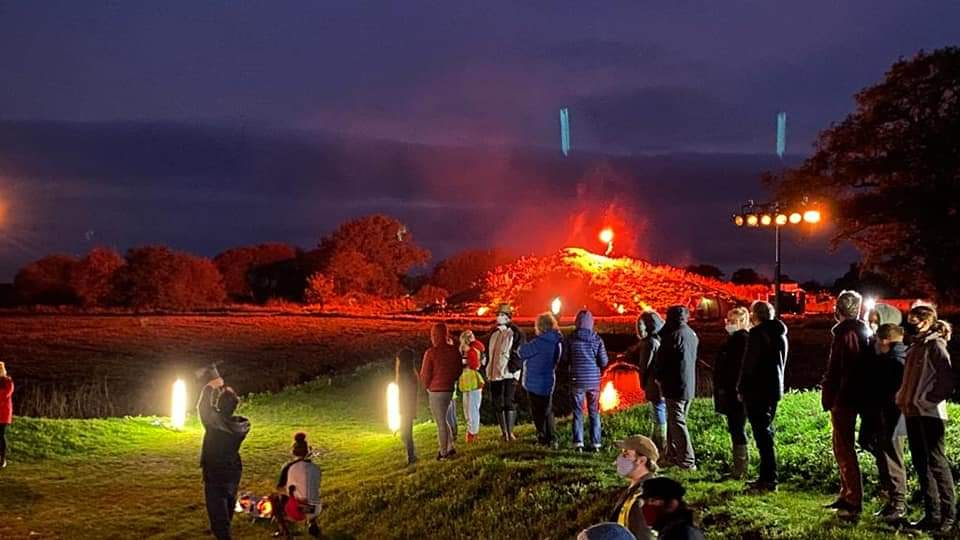
The National Youth Theatre performing during the Covid-19 pandemic in the emergency outdoor performance area

From 2002 to 2019 the Morgan Library building was leased to 'Mythstories', which styled itself as the world's first museum of storytelling.

Wem is a Transition Town.

During the COVID-19 pandemic, the National Youth Theatre of Great Britain were resident in the area and the community built them an emergency performance space.

In late 2021 the town, being in the middle of the North Shropshire constituency, saw heavy campaigning in the by-election which saw a record swing.

In 2023 efforts began to establish a community owned pub in the district. The same year two community members of the town were each presented with British Empire Medal in a ceremony in the town hall presided over by the Lord Lieutenant.

== Culture ==
=== Shakespeare ===
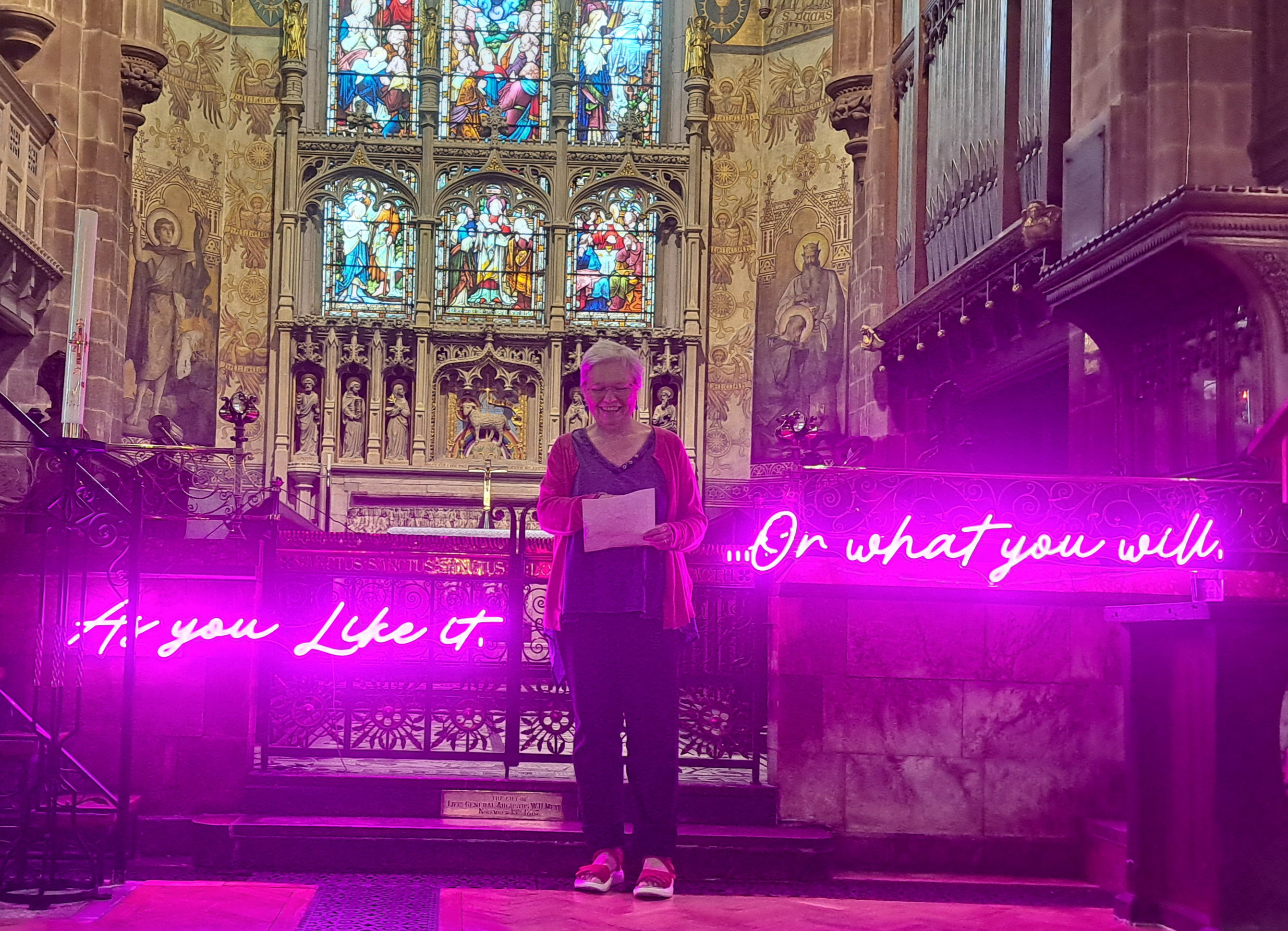
A Shakespeare Appreciation Event in Wem, Shropshire

The town and wider community has held cultural programming and Midsummer events to celebrate its association with William Shakespeare; this has also included charity openings of normally private woodlands and drama.

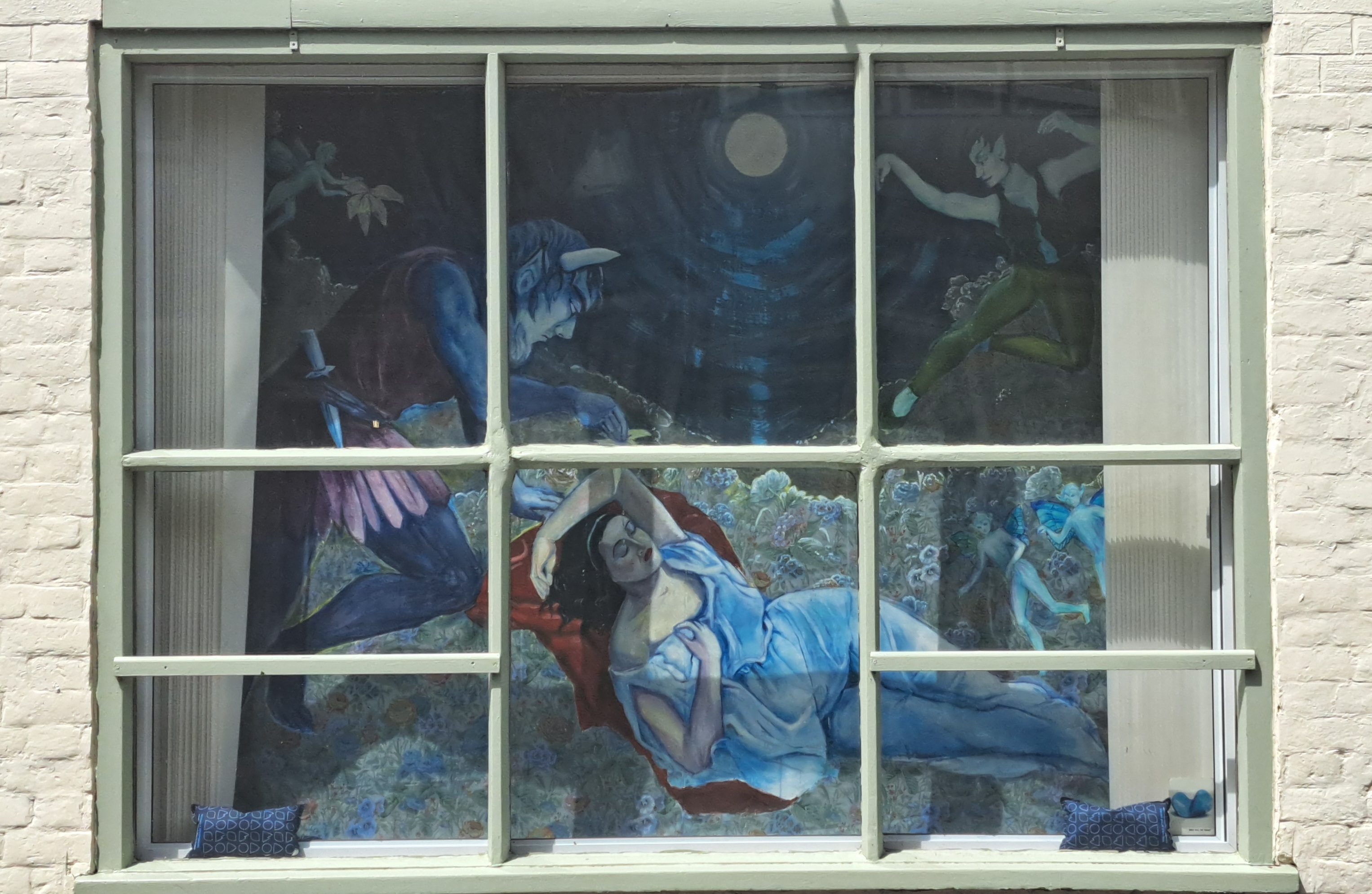
A window display on Wem High Street celebrating Shakespeare and showing 'A Midsummer Night's Dream'

=== Legends ===
==== Secret tunnels ====
There is said to have been a tunnel from the cellars under the castle mound to the building formerly known as "The Moathouse", and then on under Mill Street to Roden House, the former rectory, and there are blocked doorways in the cellars of both of these houses.

==== Witchcraft ====
Some time around 1660, some people of Wem suspected that they had found a witch. In the event the suspected witch was brought before Thomas Hill of Soulton, as justice of the district. They were spared any judicial processing as a witch and the case was disposed of mildly by the harsh standards of the time.

==== Wem ghost ====
In 1995 an amateur photographer photographed a blaze which destroyed Wem Town Hall; the photo appeared to show the ghostly figure of a young female in a window of the burning building, dressed in 'old-fashioned' clothes.

Although the photographer (who died in 2005) denied forgery, after his death it was suggested that the girl in his photo bore a 'striking similarity' to one in a postcard of the town from 1922.

==== Treacle mines ====
Wem is reputed to have "treacle mines", although it is not possible to mine treacle. Two explanations have been offered for this legend: (a) a confectioner's shop, despite the rationing and food shortages of the Second World War, was apparently always in stock of candy; alternatively (b) the byproduct of the tanning industry within the town was considered to resemble treacle.

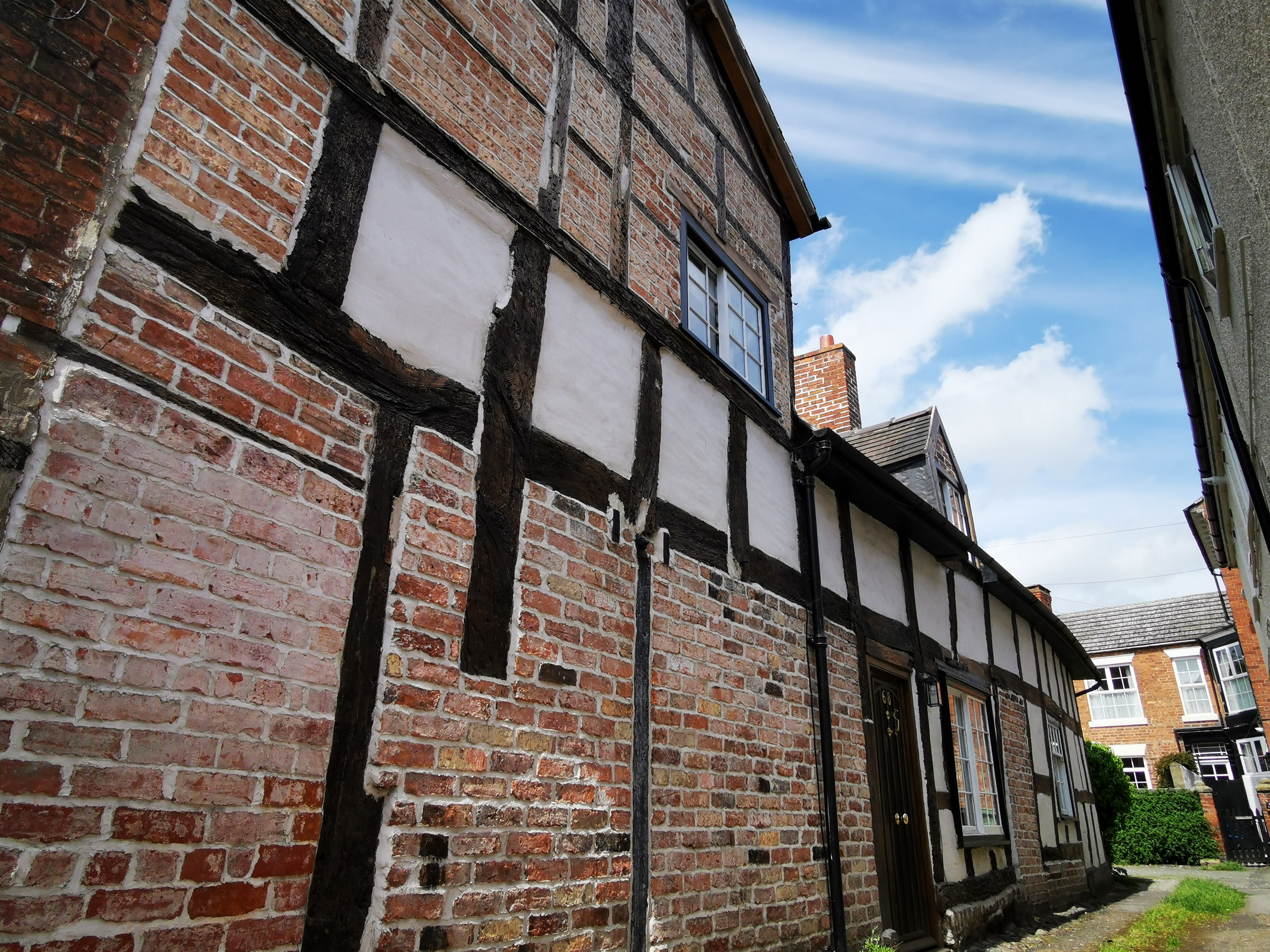
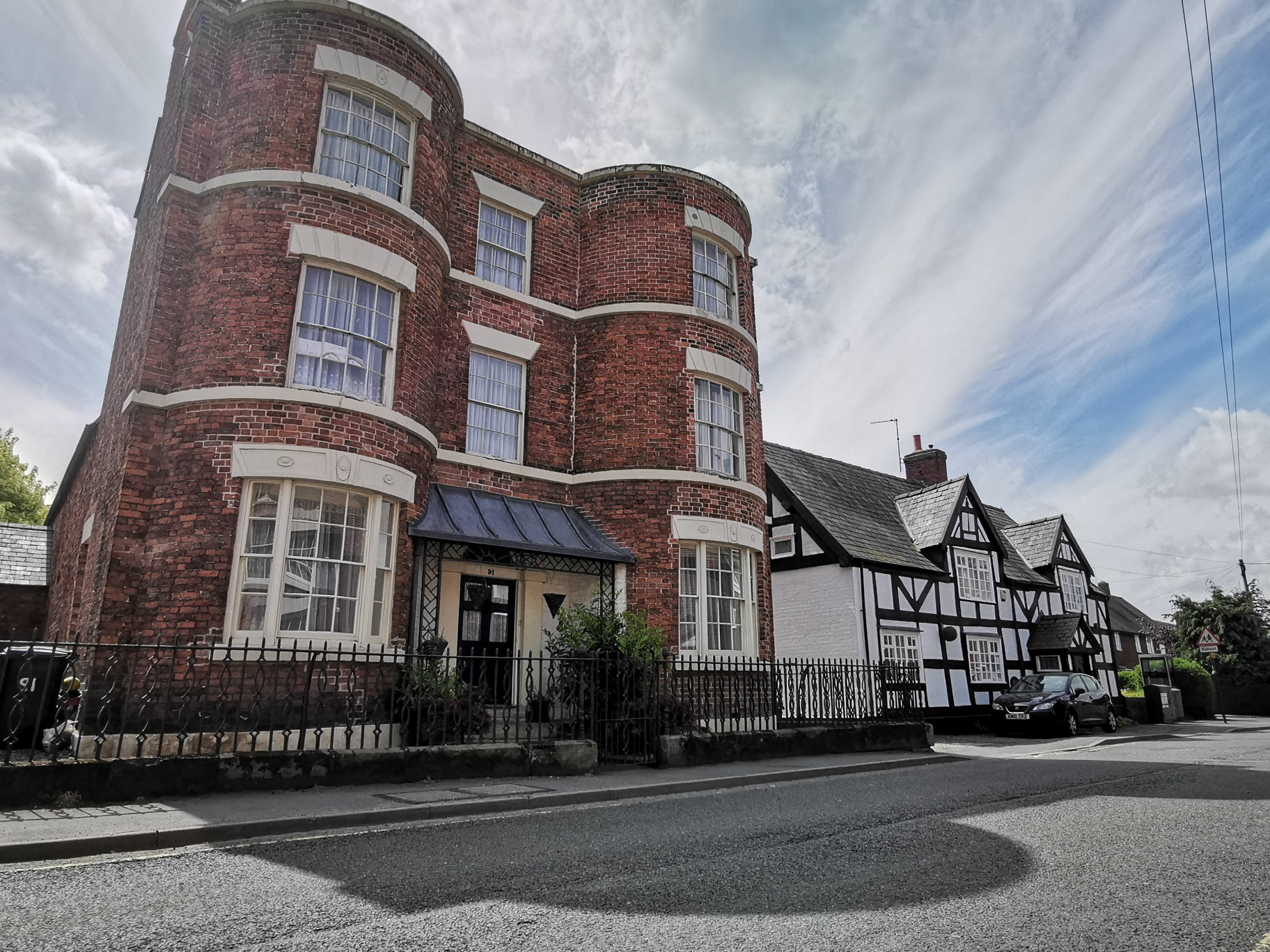
Historic buildings in Wem from the 1600s and 1700s

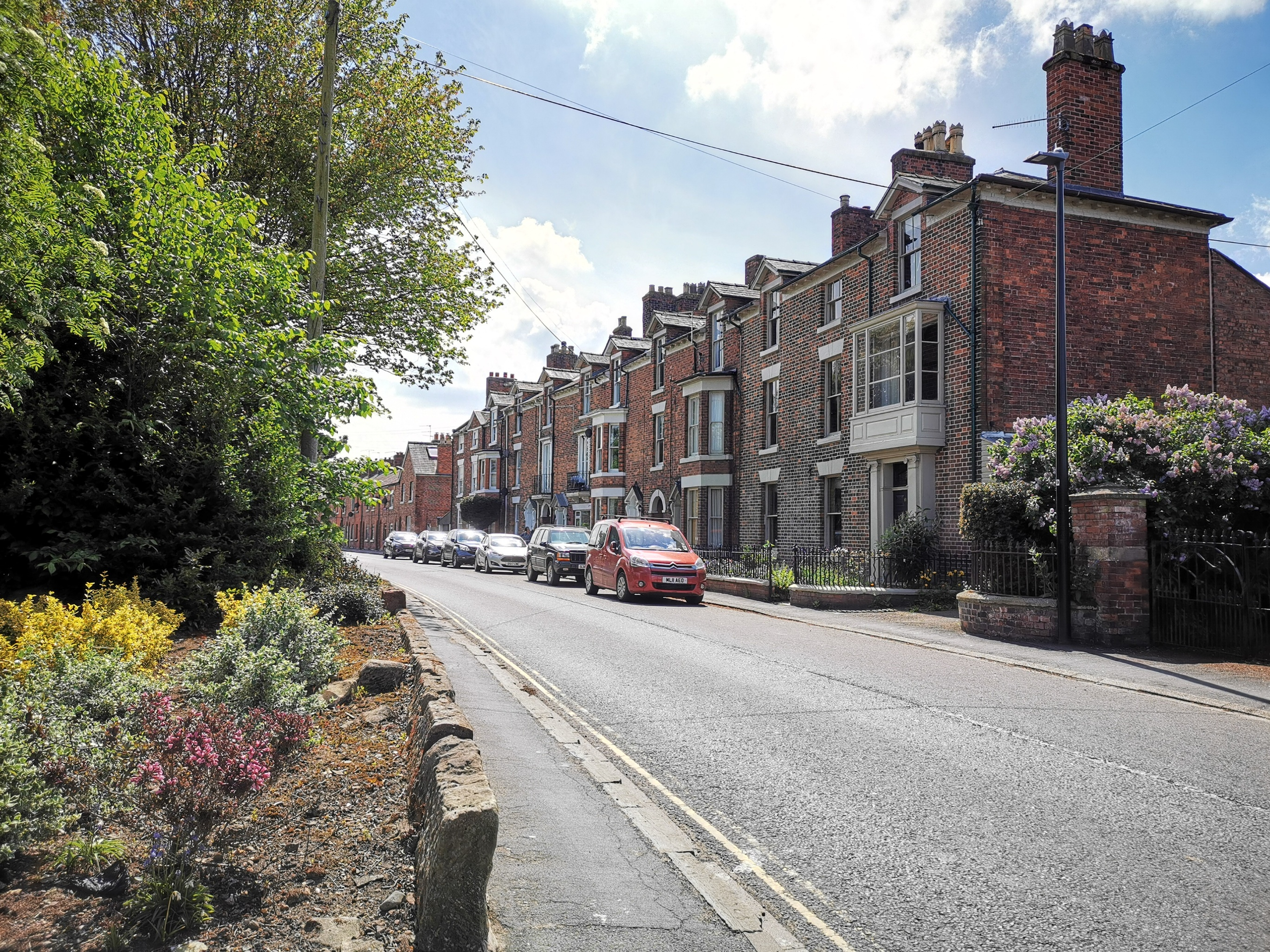
Islington in Wem

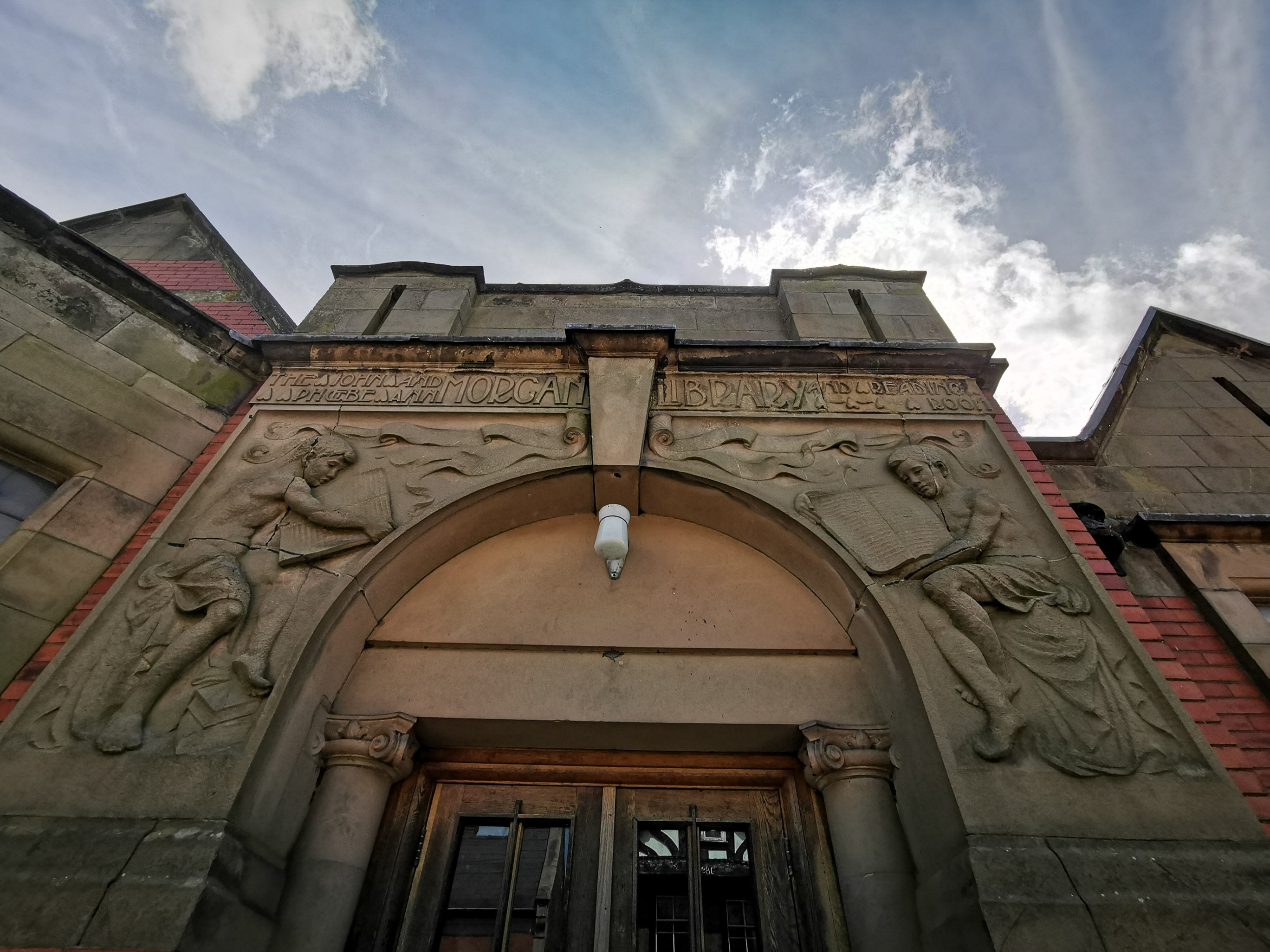
The entrance to the Arts and Crafts old library building in Wem

=== Recreation areas ===
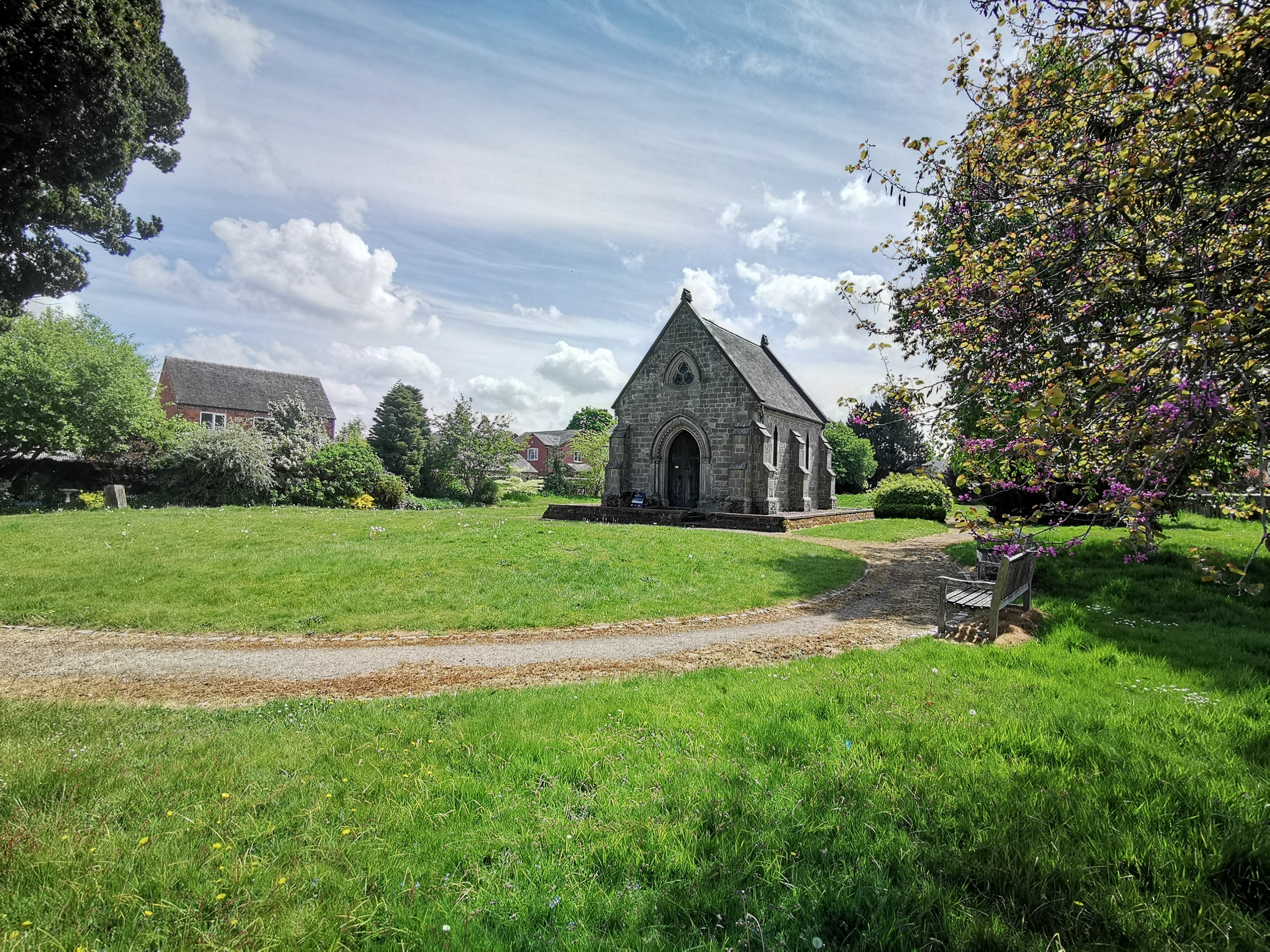
The Millennium Green (19th century cemetery, building its former chapel) in Wem

There are recreation areas at the Wem Recreation Ground and the Millennium Green (Wem Millennium Green being the smallest such green in the country).

=== Events ===
Each year Wem holds a traditional town carnival which is held on the first Saturday of September.

The Sweet Pea Festival on the third weekend of July. Wem Vehicles of Interest Rally & Grand Parade also runs alongside the Sweet Pea Festival on the Sunday.

A Wem 10 km (6.2 mi) running race was instituted in 2019.

=== Local landmarks and attractions ===
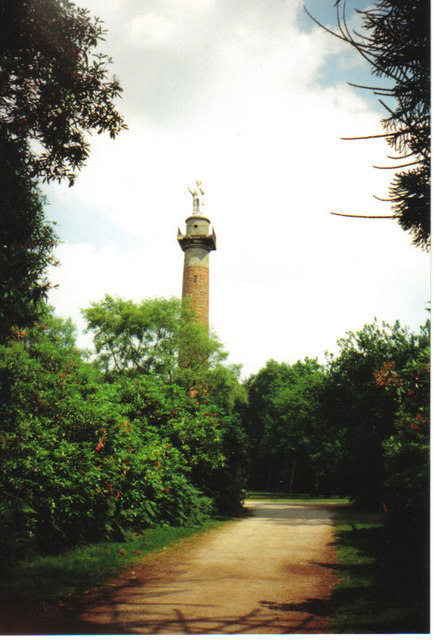
Hawstone Park Follies (statue of Old Sir Rowland Hill)

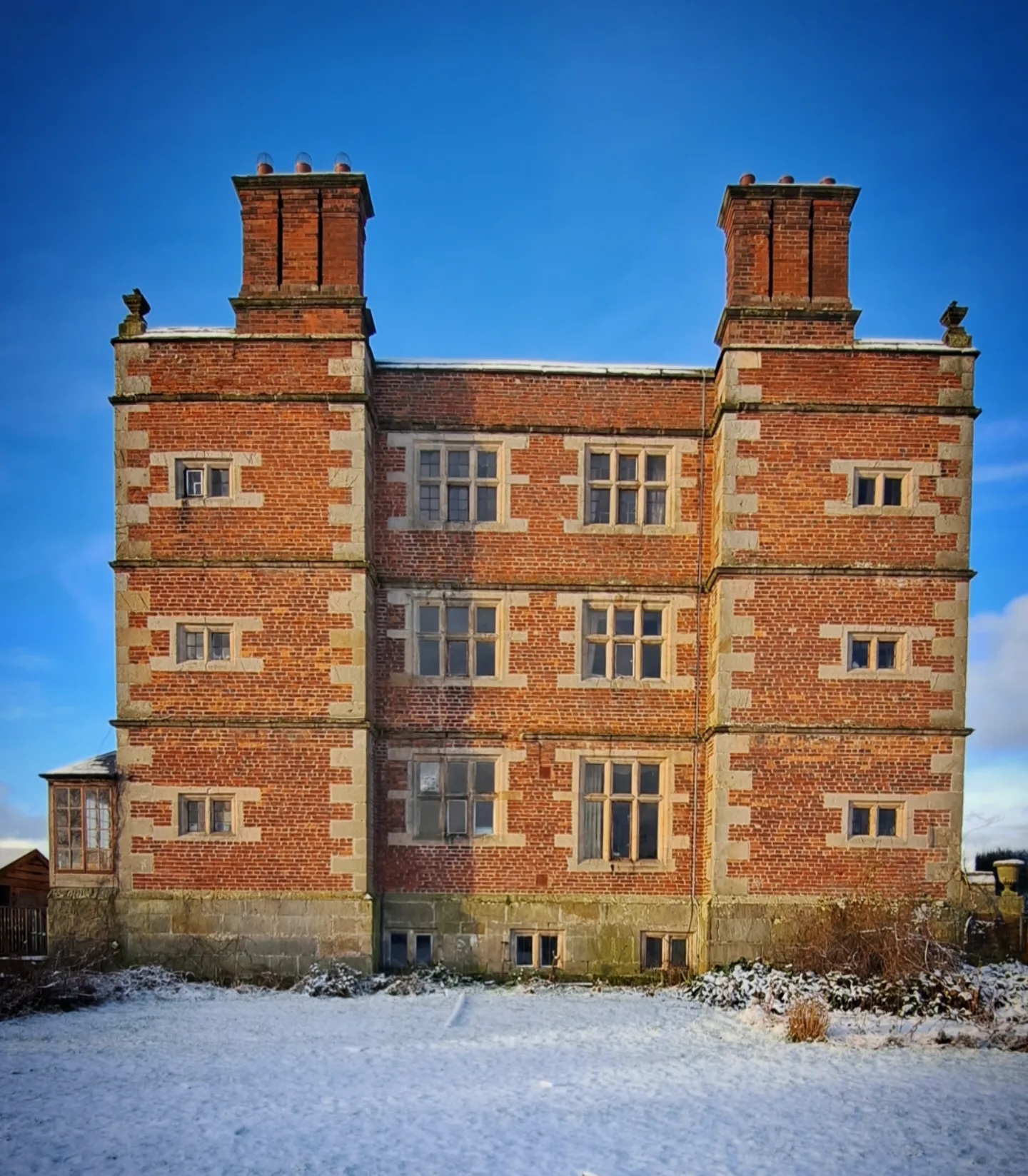
Soulton Hall, the house of Sir Rowland Hill

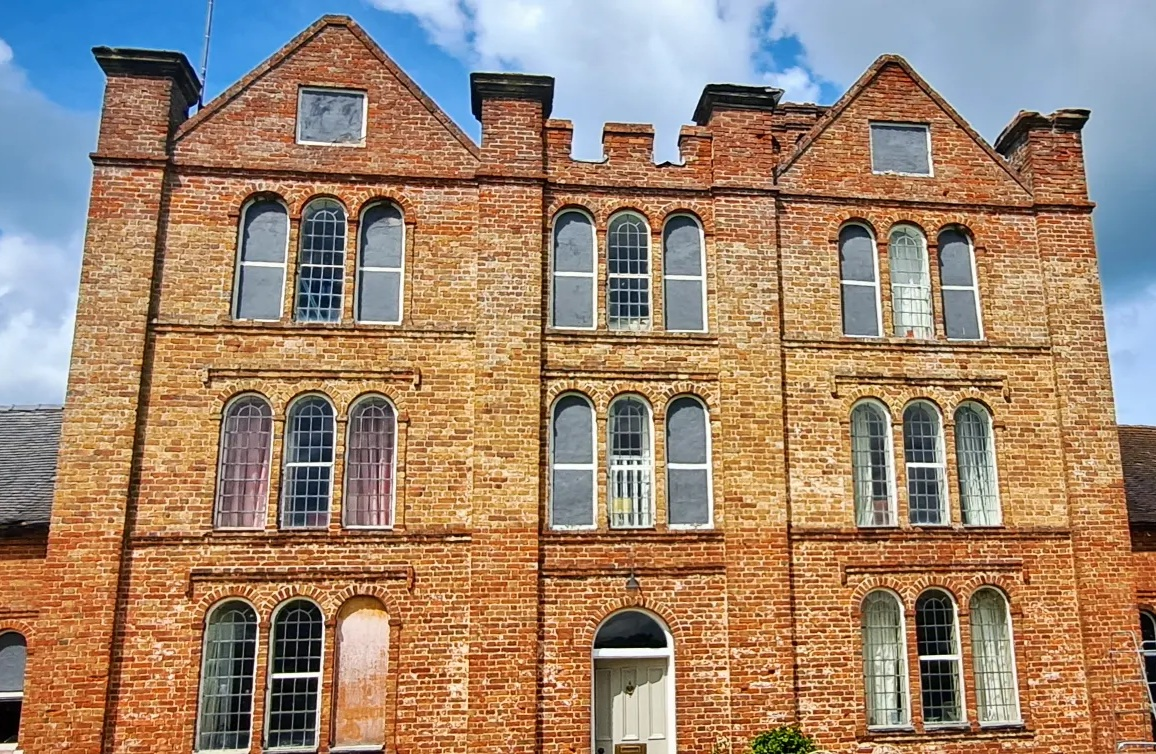
Hawkstone Abbey Farm

- Hawkstone Park – a destination on the English Grand Tour and a historic landscape park with pleasure grounds and gardens historically associated with King Arthur and the Holy Grail.
- Soulton Hall – the house of Sir Rowland Hill
- Hawkstone Abbey Farm – the headquarters of Appleby's Dairy, once part of the Hill estates.
- Hawkstone Hall and Gardens – another house of the Rowland Hill legacy estates
- Whixall Marina – on The Llangollen Canal of the Shropshire Union Canal and the short Prees Branch of the Ellesmere Canal.
- Fenn's, Whixall and Bettisfield Mosses National Nature Reserve – The reserve is part of the Midland Meres and Mosses, an Important Plant Area which was declared a Wetland of International Importance under the Ramsar Convention.
- Grinshill – in sight of the town; Charles Darwin found his first fossils there as a young person and the door case of 10 Downing Street was constructed from stone taken from there.
- Hodnet Hall Gardens – a 60-acre (24 ha) garden

=== Sport and clubs ===
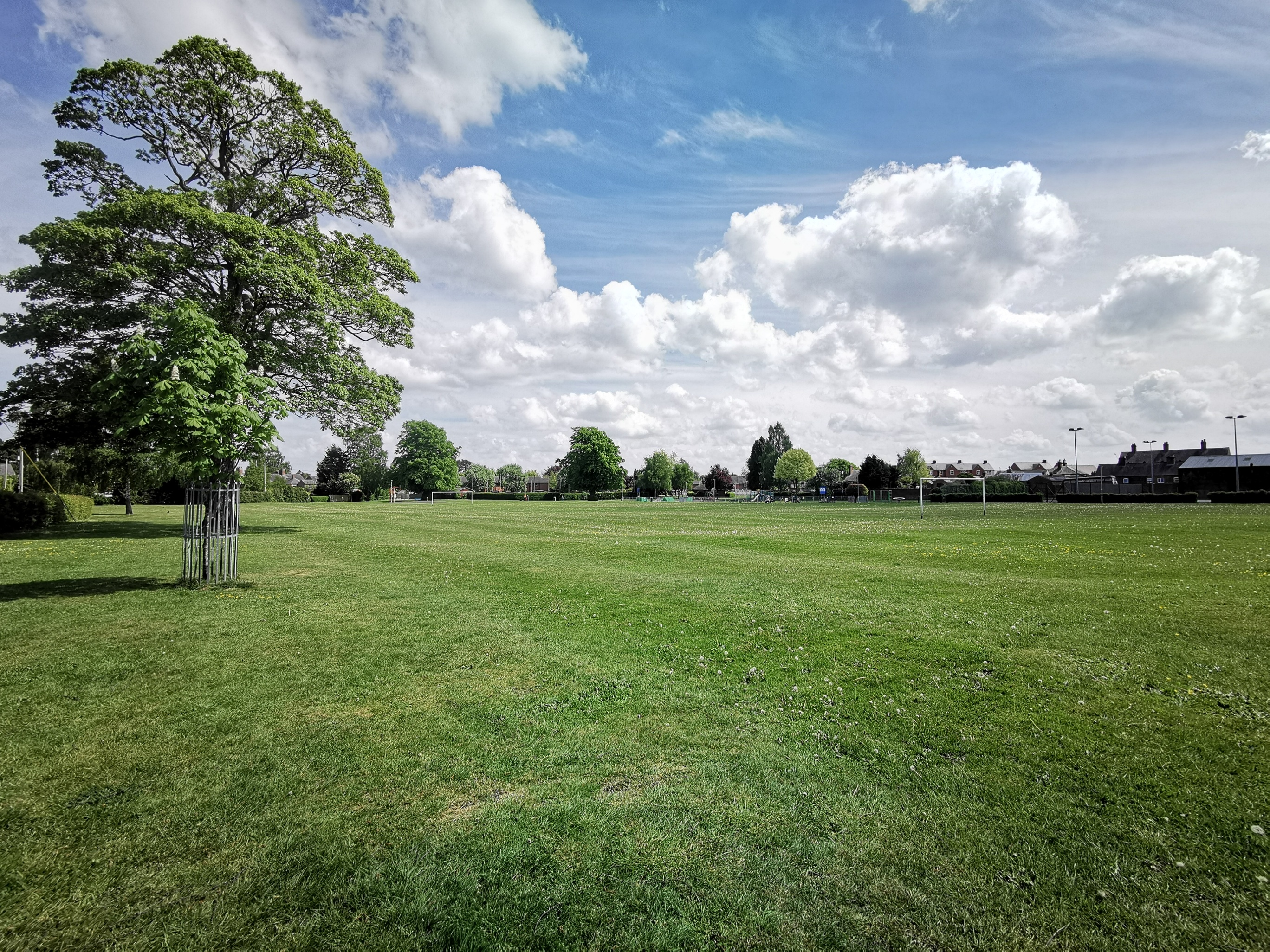
Wem recreation ground

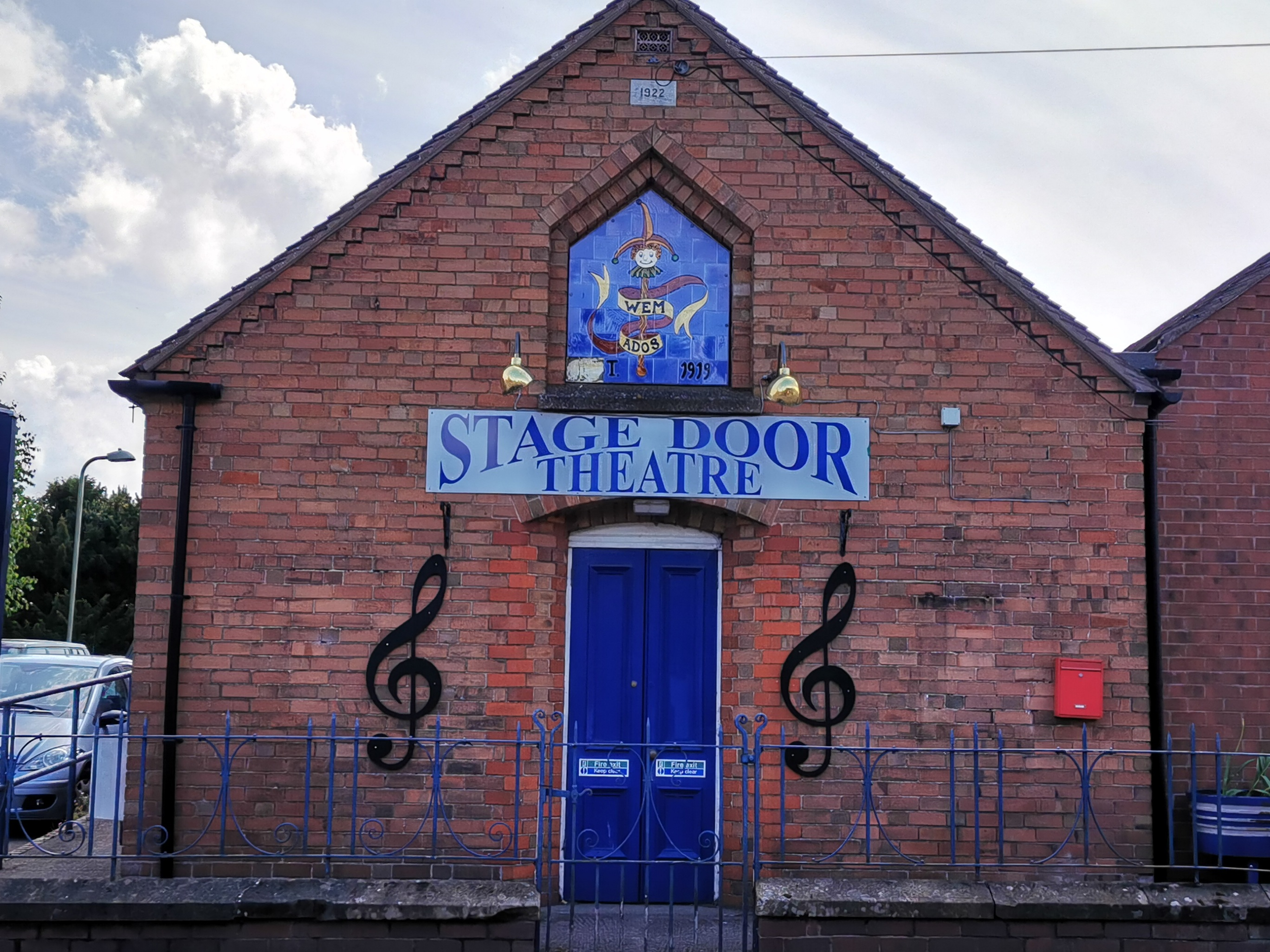
Wem Amateur Dramatics Society Building: former Apostolic Chapel acquired by the society after 1995 town hall fire

Sports clubs within the town include:

- Wem Town Football Club
- Wem Cricket Club
- Wem Tennis Club
- Wem United Services Bowling Club
- Wem Bowling Club
- Wem Albion Bowling Club

Clubs and societies include:

- Wem Amateur Dramatics Society (established 1919)
- Sweetpea society
- Rotary Club of Wem and District
- Wem Sports and Social Club
- The Senior Club
- Wem & District Garden Club
- The United Services Club
- Wem Jubilee Band (a brass band established 1977, with origins in the 1930s)

== Governance ==
Wem was historically the centre of a large parish, which became a civil parish in 1866. In 1891 the civil parish had a population of 3796.

On 1 April 1900 the parish of "Wem" was abolished and the outer parts of the parish were separated to form the civil parish of Wem Rural, and the town itself became the civil parish of Wem Urban, coextensive with Wem Urban District. In 1967 the urban district was abolished and became part of North Shropshire Rural District. From 1974 to 2009 it was part of North Shropshire district.

The parish council of Wem Urban has exercised its right to call itself a town council.

The electoral ward of Wem for the purposes of elections to Shropshire Council also covers part of Wem Rural parish. The population of this ward at the 2011 Census was 8,234.

== Economy ==
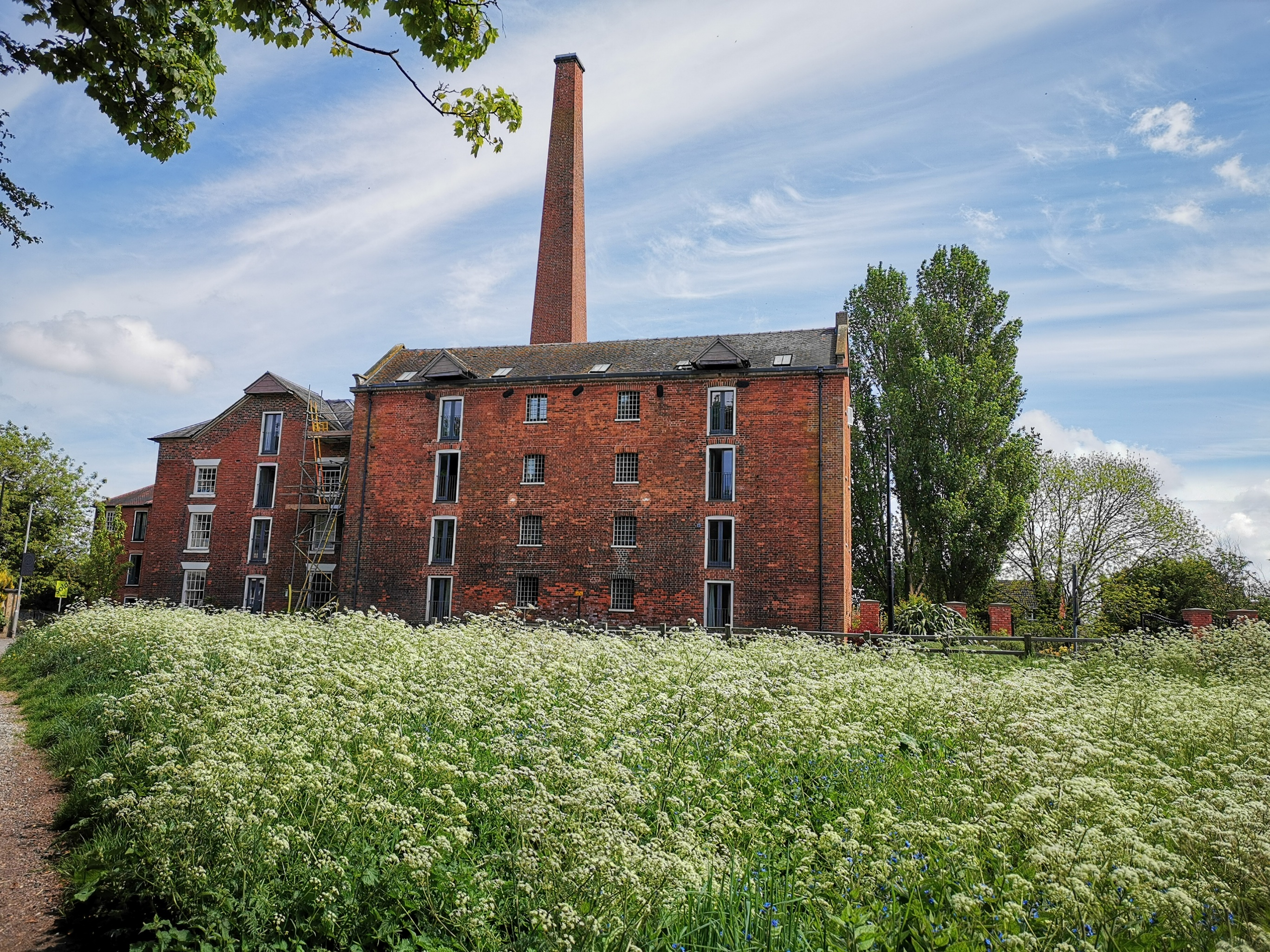
River Roden and Wem Mill. There has been a mill on this site since medieval times. The building was converted to flats in the mid-2000s.

The pre-modern economy of the town was based on agriculture and forestry and the processing of its output. Brewing, initially a cottage industry, was carried out in Wem as early as 1700, when Richard Gough wrote of a contemporary in his History of Myddle a Latin aphorism he translated: Let slaves admire base things, but my friend still/My cup and can with Wem's stoute ale shall fill.

By 1900 a Shrewsbury and Wem Brewery Company traded on a widespread scale after acquiring the brewery in Noble Street previously run by Charles Henry Kynaston. The company was taken over in turn by Greenall Whitley & Co Ltd but the brewery was closed in 1988. From 1986 to 1988 the brewery was the shirt sponsor for Shrewsbury Town FC.

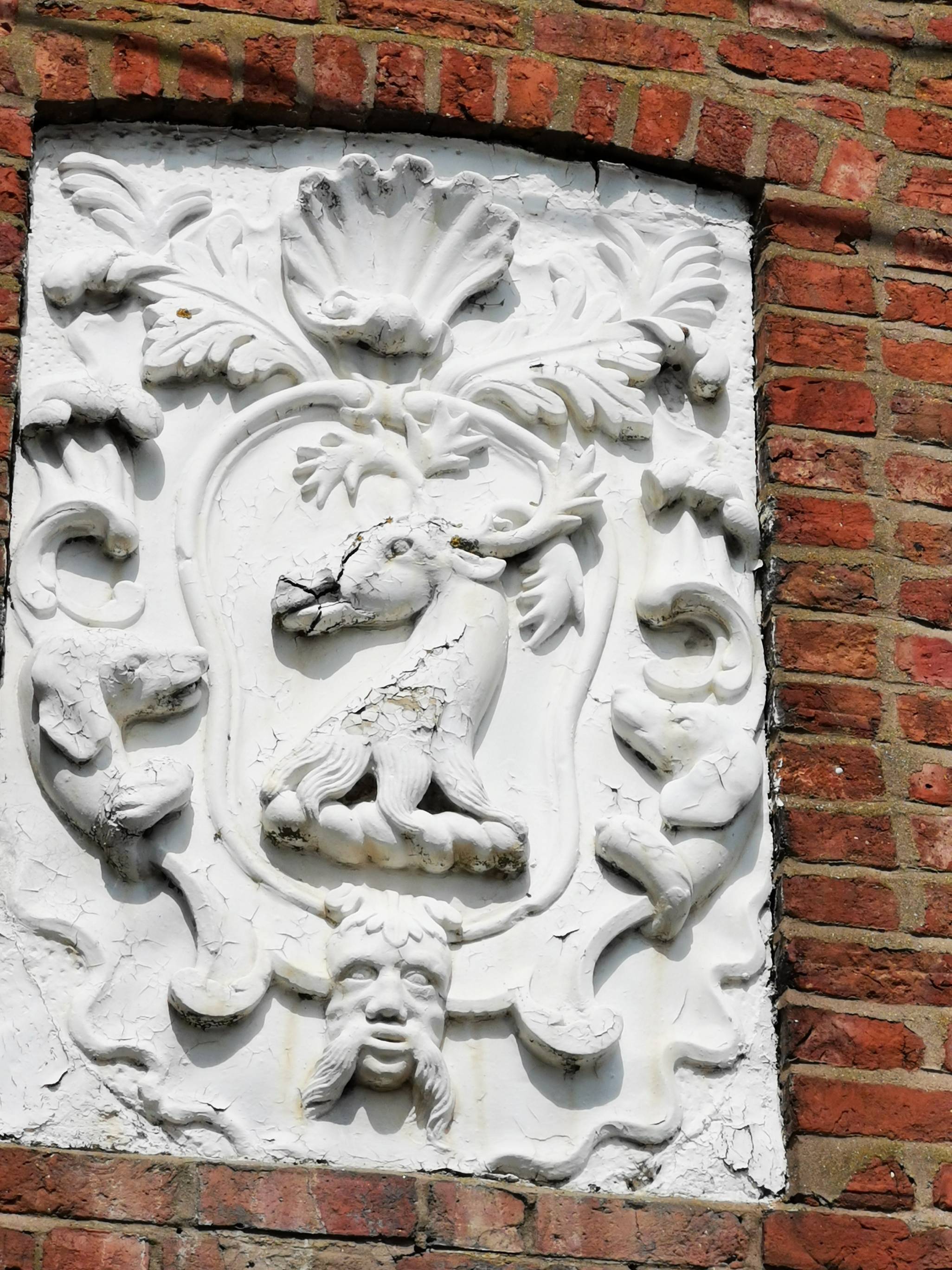
An old pub sign in the town

A new brewing company, Hanby was founded in December 1988 by Peter Simmonds and Jack Hanby, who had previously worked for the Greenall Whitley brewery in Wem. Initially located in rented accommodation in Aston Park, the company began brewing their own ales in Easter 1989 once they had suitable premises. The brewery was taken over in late 2008, following Hanby Ales going into receivership, to be renamed as Wem Brewing Company but that in turn ceased trading in 2010.

There is a mid-sized industrial estate to the east of the town.

== Coat of arms and flag ==
The Wem Town Council use arms which are the shield of Shropshire, with a phoenix crest, with the shield laid over of an axe and a scythe.

== Geography ==
The River Roden flows to the south of the town.

The Shropshire Way long distance waymarked path passes through Wem.

== Education ==
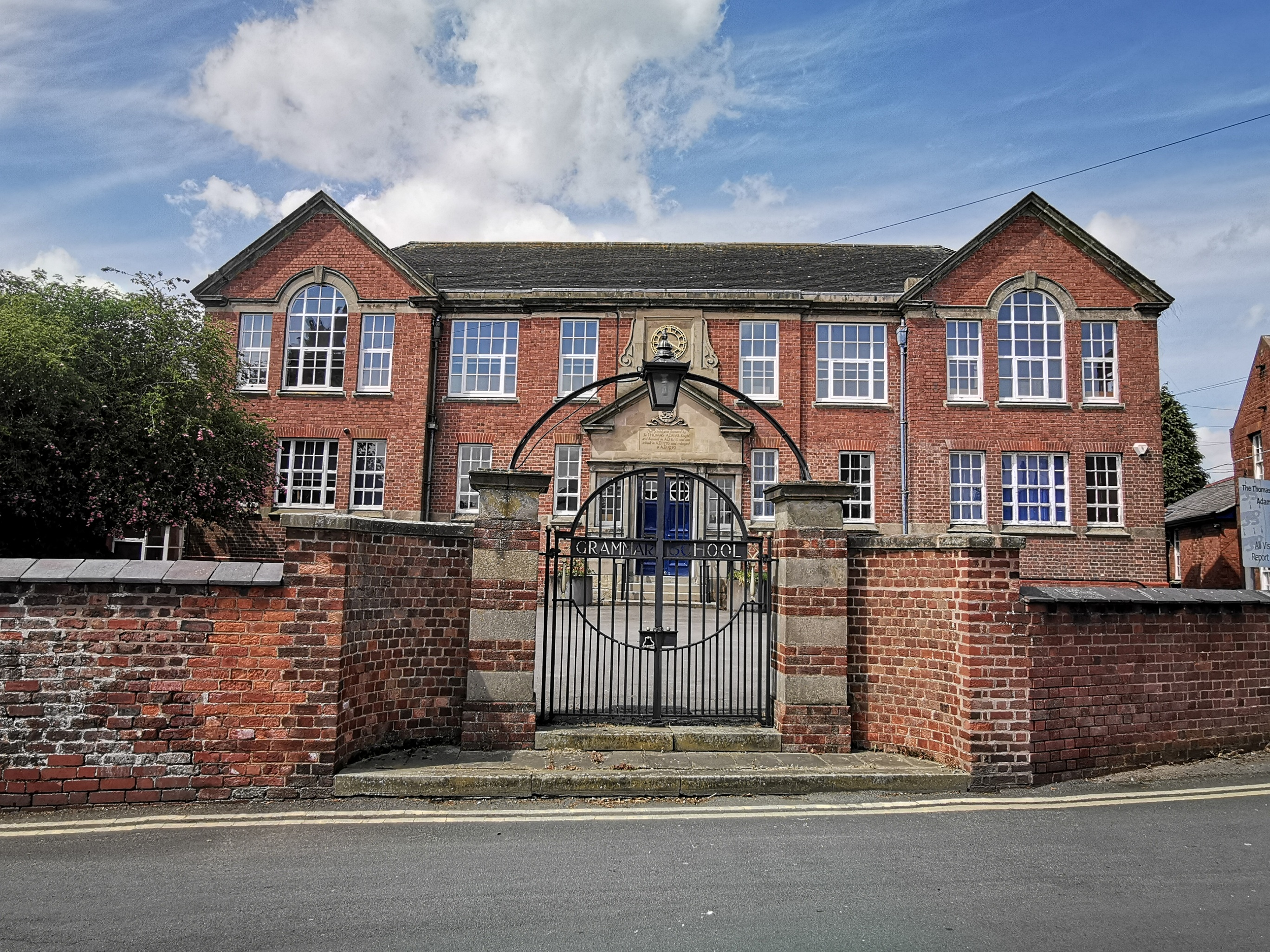
The Adams School

St Peters is a Church of England primary school in Wem.

Thomas Adams School is a state-funded secondary school, established in 1650. This was an independent grammar school until 1976, at which point it merged with Wem Modern School to form a comprehensive school. It also has a Sixth Form College on site.

A number of private schools have operated in Wem over the centuries. William Hazlitt's father ran a 'model crammer for the dissenting rationalist' in the town, the 'Mrs Swanswick's School' ran from the late 1700s to the 1840s and one of its headmasters, Joseph Pattison, took a leading role in founding British Schools to educate children from less advantaged families. A further six private schools operated out of Wem over time.

== Religious life ==
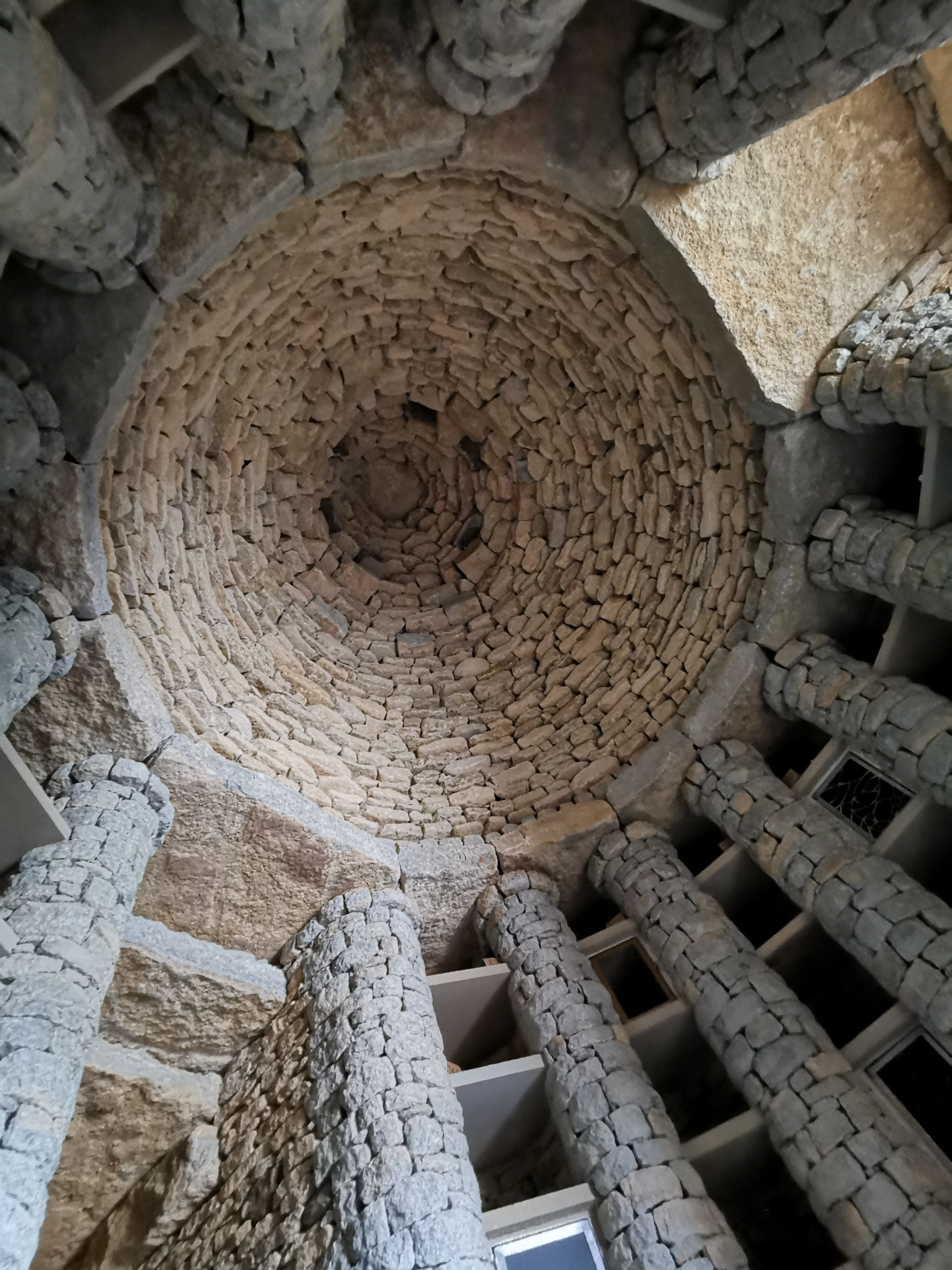
Soulton Long Barrow, a modern columbarium outside the town

Within the town there are four main churches:

- Anglican Parish Church of St. Peter & St. Paul - this was once allied to nearby Edstaston Church of St Mary the Virgin and is currently aligned with St Luke's Weston-under-Redcastle.
- Baptist
- Methodist
- Roman Catholic

A modern long barrow has recently been built at Soulton Long Barrow

The town has staged outdoor nativity plays.

== Media ==
Local news and television programmes are provided by BBC West Midlands and ITV Central. Television signals are received from the Wrekin TV transmitter. Local radio stations are BBC Radio Shropshire, Hits Radio Black Country & Shropshire, Greatest Hits Radio Black Country & Shropshire and Capital North West and Wales. The Whitchurch Herald and Shropshire Star are the town's local newspapers.

== Transport ==
=== Rail ===
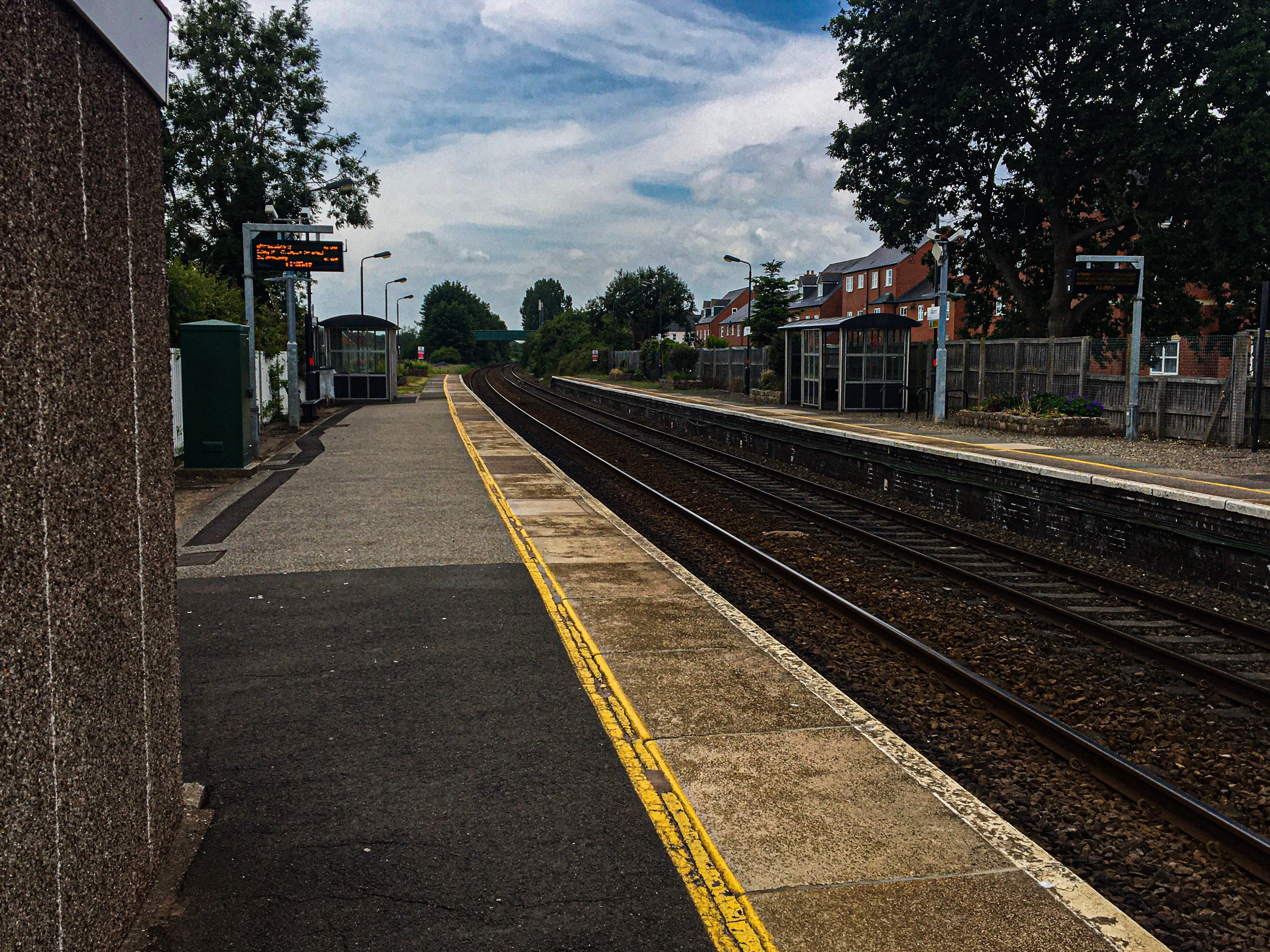
Wem railway station in 2020

The Crewe and Shrewsbury Railway was completed in 1858, and Wem has been connected to national rail services since this time.

The town has a railway station located on the Welsh Marches Line. All services are operated by Transport for Wales. The majority of services that call at the station are between Shrewsbury and Crewe, however, some long-distance services to Manchester Piccadilly, Cardiff Central, Swansea, Carmarthen and Milford Haven also stop at the station during peak times.

=== Canals ===
The canal network came closest to Wem at Whixhall and Edstaston; the Ellesmere canal was closed to navigation by Act of Parliament in 1944.

=== Air ===
There is an airfield at Sleap.

=== Bus ===
The town is served by the 511 and 512 bus route, operated by Arriva Midlands North, which runs between Shrewsbury and Whitchurch. Some services terminate in Wem and do not continue to Whitchurch.

Bus services in Wem, Shropshire
Bus operator	Route	Destination(s)	Notes
Arriva Midlands North	511	Shrewsbury → Hadnall → Clive → Wem → Prees → Whitchurch	Some services terminate in Wem.

== Twin towns ==
Since 1978, Wem has been twinned with Fismes in France, after which is named a road in Wem, Fismes Way.

== Notable people ==
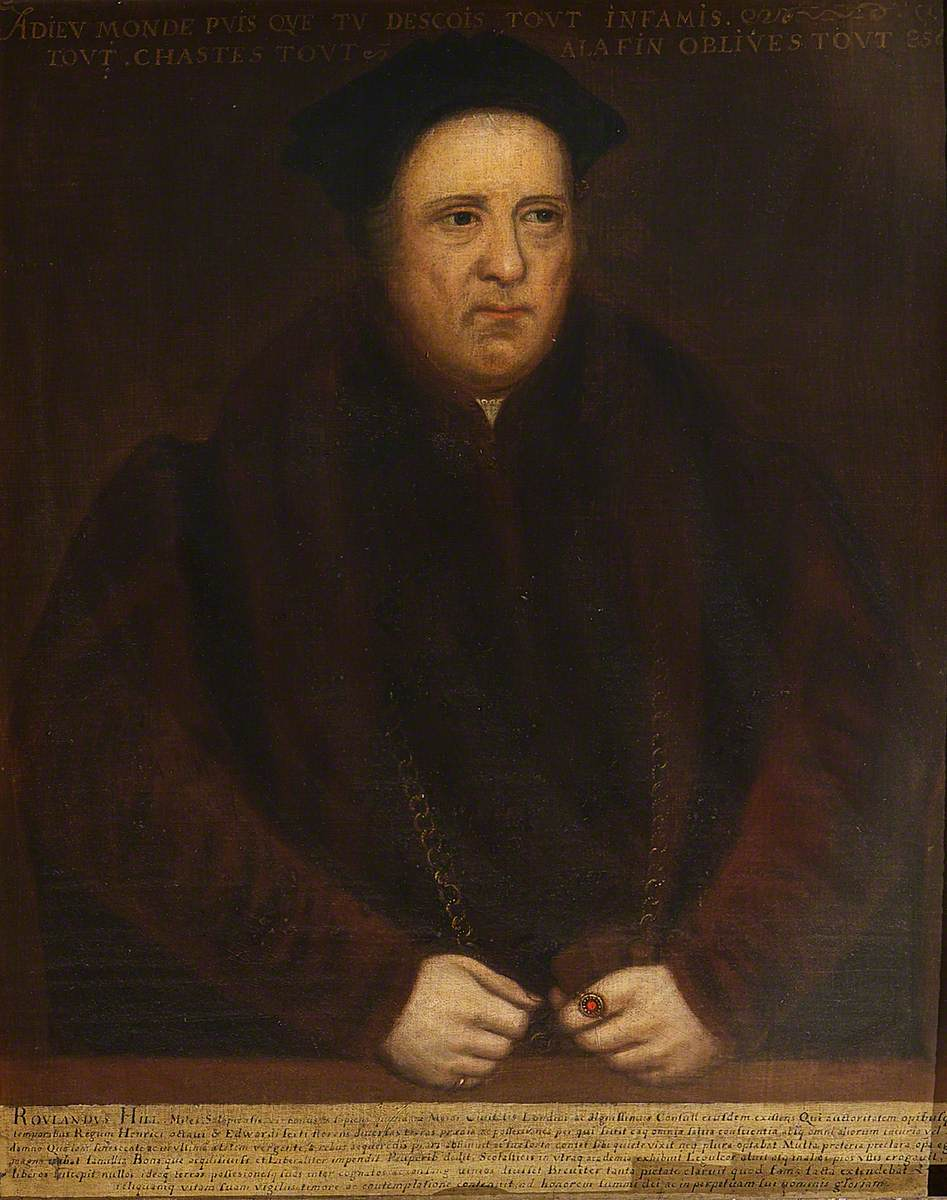
Sir Rowland Hill, Tudor statesman, owner and builder of Soulton Hall

- Sir Rowland Hill, (circa 1495–1561) coordinator of the Geneva Bible translation, Tudor statesman, Lord Mayor of London, philanthropist and scholar, built Soulton Hall for himself between 1556 and 1560.
- Sir Thomas Adams, 1st Baronet (1586 in Wem–1667/1668), Lord Mayor of London and MP for the City of London 1654–1655 and 1656–1658.
- William Wycherley (1641–1716), restoration dramatist, brought up at nearby Trench Farm.
- George Jeffreys, 1st Baron Jeffreys (1645–1689), aka Judge Jeffreys, took his title as Baron Jeffreys of Wem in 1685; had house at Lowe Hall near the town.
- Samuel Garbet (died 1751?), master at Wem Grammar School, wrote the first history of Wem.
- Philip Holland (1721 in Wem–1789), nonconformist minister.
- John Astley (1724 in Wem–1787), portrait painter and amateur architect
- John Ireland (died 1808), a British writer from the Trench Farm.
- William Hazlitt (1778–1830), essayist, drama and literary critic, painter and philosopher.
- Sir John Bickerton Williams (1792–1855 in Wem), lawyer, nonconformist historian.
- Anna Essinger (1879–1960), German Jewish educator; during WWII cared for refugee children in Trench Hall
- Donald Court (1912 in Wem–1994), paedriatician
- Peter Jones (1920 in Wem–2000), actor, screenwriter and broadcaster and for 29 years a regular contestant on the panel game Just A Minute
- Peter Vaughan (1923 in Wem–2016), character actor, known for his roles as Grouty in the sitcom Porridge and Maester Aemon in Game of Thrones
- Barry Davies (1944 in Wem–2016), SAS soldier and author
- Sybil Ruscoe (born 1960 in Wem), radio and television presenter
- Greg Davies (born 1968), stand-up comedian, actor; was brought up in the town and went to Thomas Adams School

=== Sports ===
- Edward Whalley-Tooker (1863 in Wem–1940), farmer and cricketer, played for Hampshire
- Mary Steedman (1867–1921), tennis player who was semi-finalist at Wimbledon, lived in Wem when her husband, Gilbert Vane, was Rector from 1895 to 1905.
- Reg Revans (1907-2003 in Wem), Olympic long jumper.
- Brian Bailey (1932-2022 in Wem), sports shooter at 1972 Summer Olympics, lived in Wem from age four.
- Neil Faith (born 1981), English semi-retired professional wrestler; went to Thomas Adams School

== Freedom of the Town ==
The following people and military units have received the Freedom of the Town of Wem.

=== Military units ===
- RAF Shawbury: 1 August 2018.

== See also ==
- Listed buildings in Wem Urban
- Listed buildings in Wem Rural
