= Still Life with a Silver Jug =

Painting by Willem Kalf

Still Life with a Silver Jug and a Porcelain Bowl
- Still Life with Silver Ewer
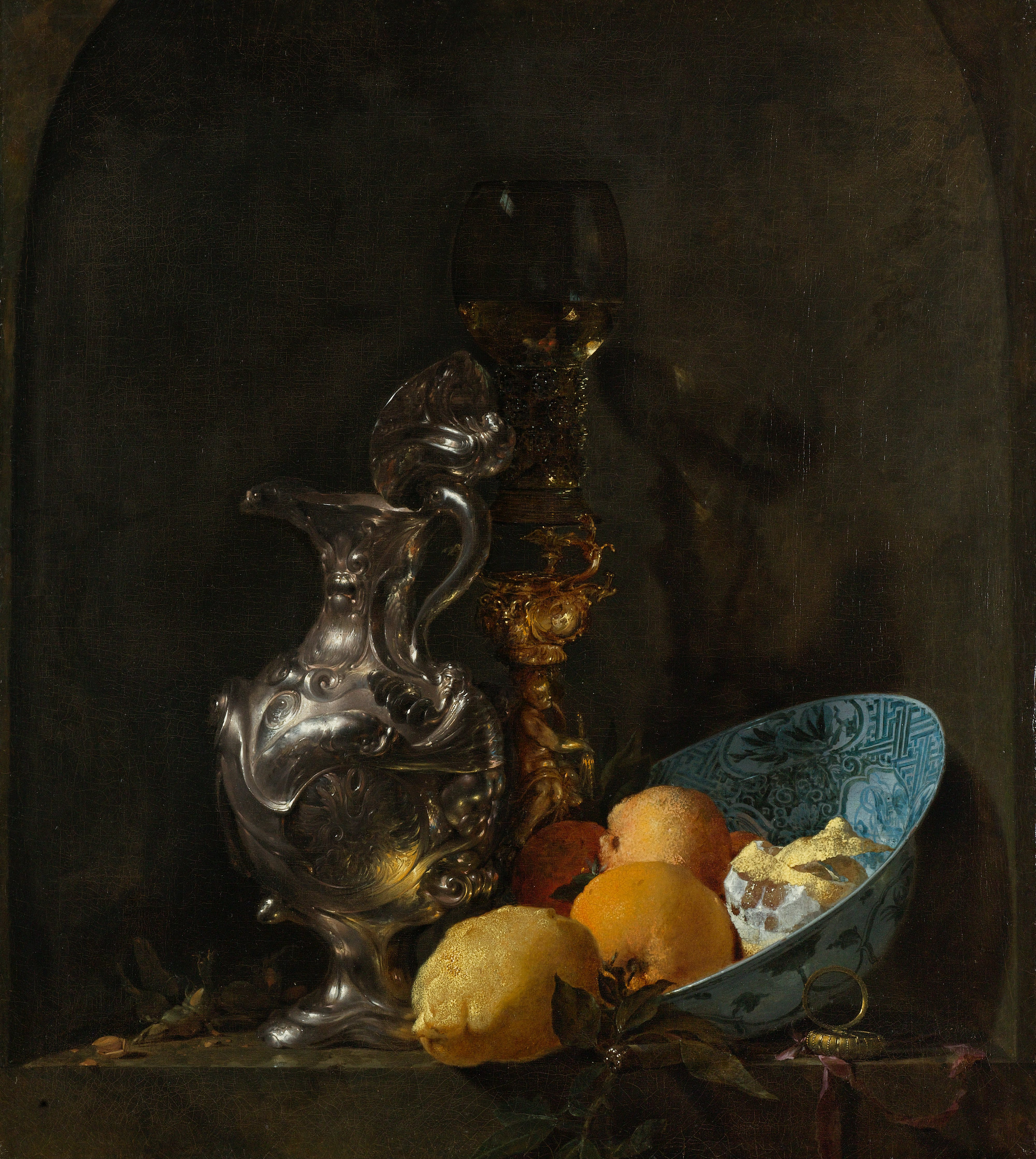
- Artist: Willem Kalf
- Year: 1655–1660
- Medium: canvas, oil paint
- Dimensions: 73.8 cm (29.1 in) × 65.2 cm (25.7 in)
- Location: Gallery of Honour, Netherlands
- Owner: Albertus Jonas Brandt
- Collection: Rijksmuseum
- Accession No.: SK-A-199
- Identifiers: RKDimages ID: 6750; Bildindex der Kunst und Architektur ID: 20016739

Still Life with a Silver Jug (Dutch: Stilleven met zilveren schenkkan ) is a 1655–1660 oil painting on canvas by the Dutch artist Willem Kalf (1619–1693). It is a still-life composition of fruit in a porcelain bowl next to an elaborate silver jug. The painting is now in the Rijksmuseum in Amsterdam, which purchased it at the sale of Albertus Jonas Brandt's collection in Amsterdam on 29 October 1821.

== Sources ==
- Still Life with a Silver Jug in Rijksmuseum
- Still Life with a Silver Jug and a Porcelain Bowl on Google Arts & Culture
