= Eelke Jelles Eelkema =

Dutch painter

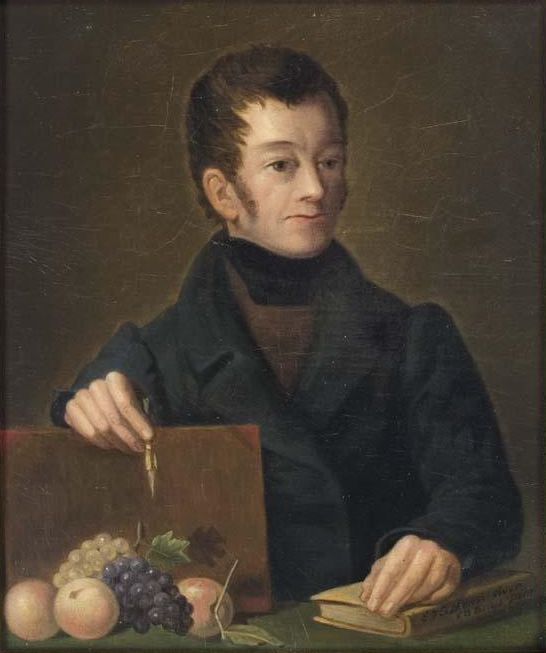
- Portrait of Eelke Jelles Eelkema by Cornelis Bernardus Buijs, circa 1825-1834 (Leeuwarden, Fries Museum)
- Born: 8 July 1788; Leeuwarden, Dutch Republic
- Died: 27 November 1839 (aged 51); Leeuwarden, Netherlands
- Occupation: Painter

Eelke Jelles Eelkema (8 July 1788 – 27 November 1839) was a Dutch painter of landscapes, flowers, and fruit. He was born at Leeuwarden as the son of a merchant. On account of his deafness, which was brought on by an illness at the age of seven, he was educated in the first Dutch institution for the deaf and dumb at Groningen (1799). The Flemish Gerardus de San, first director of the Academie Minerva, instructed Eelkema in the art of drawing.

In 1804, Eelkema obtained the first prize of the academy. In 1808 he went back to his home town. In 1814 he was rewarded a stipend and lived in Paris for two years. In 1819, one of Haarlem's top bulb breeders, Mattheus van Eeden (1756–1831), allowed him to paint the flowers in his "Flora" nursery, which Eelkema later arranged as bouquets on canvas at home, as shown in the Rijksmuseum, Amsterdam. Eelkema then travelled by foot in France, Switzerland, and Italy, making sketches. In 1820 he had an exhibition of his work in Amsterdam. Afterwards he taught at the Atheneum in Franeker, communicating on a slate.

In 1823 Eelkema visited London. In 1830 Eelkema had translated from the French language a theoretical work by the miniaturist André Léon Larue Mansion . He painted until he lost his sight, and died at Leeuwarden in 1839.

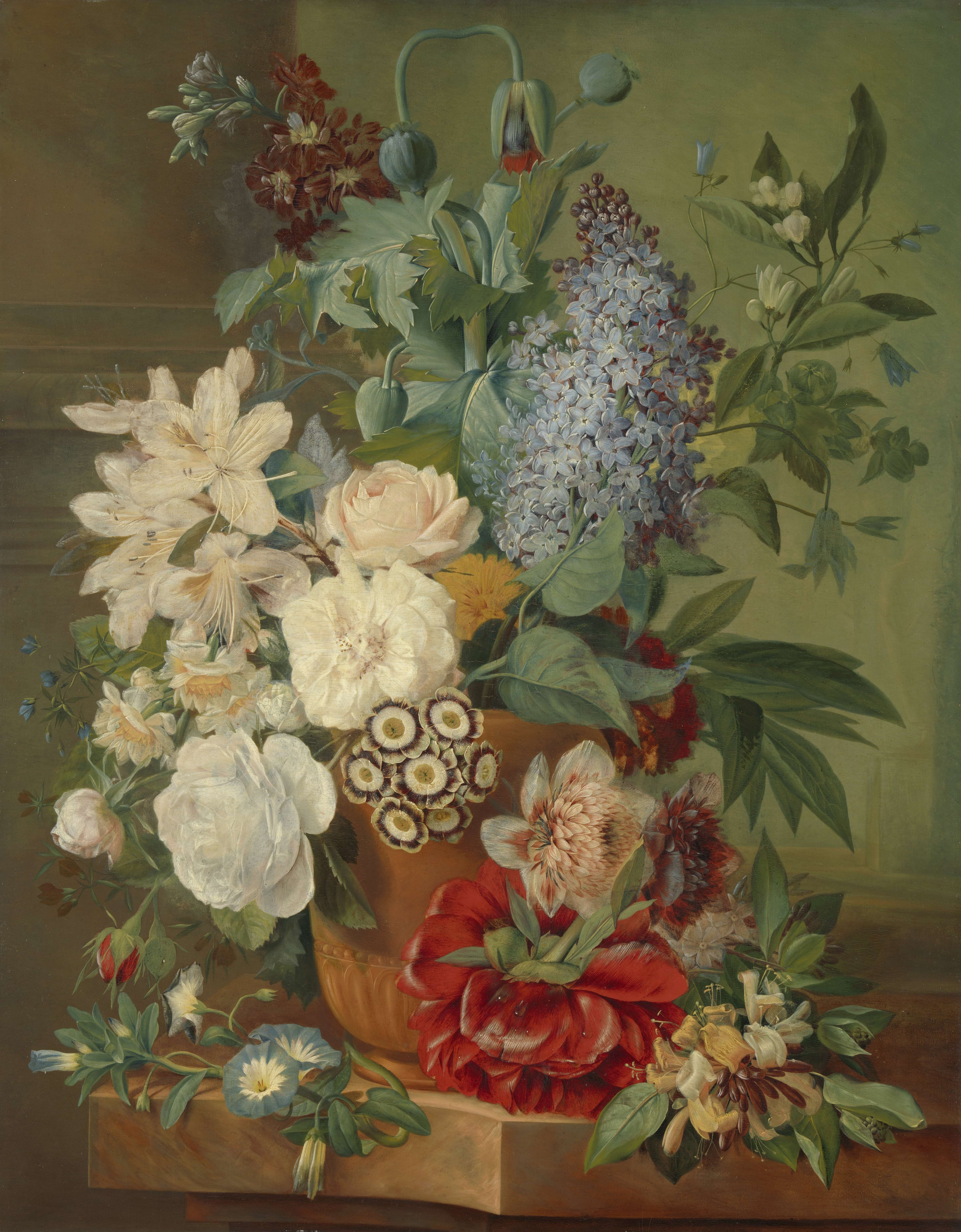
Flowers in a Terracotta Vase (c. 1810–1824) started by Albertus Jonas Brandt and finished by Eelkema after Brandt's death in 1821

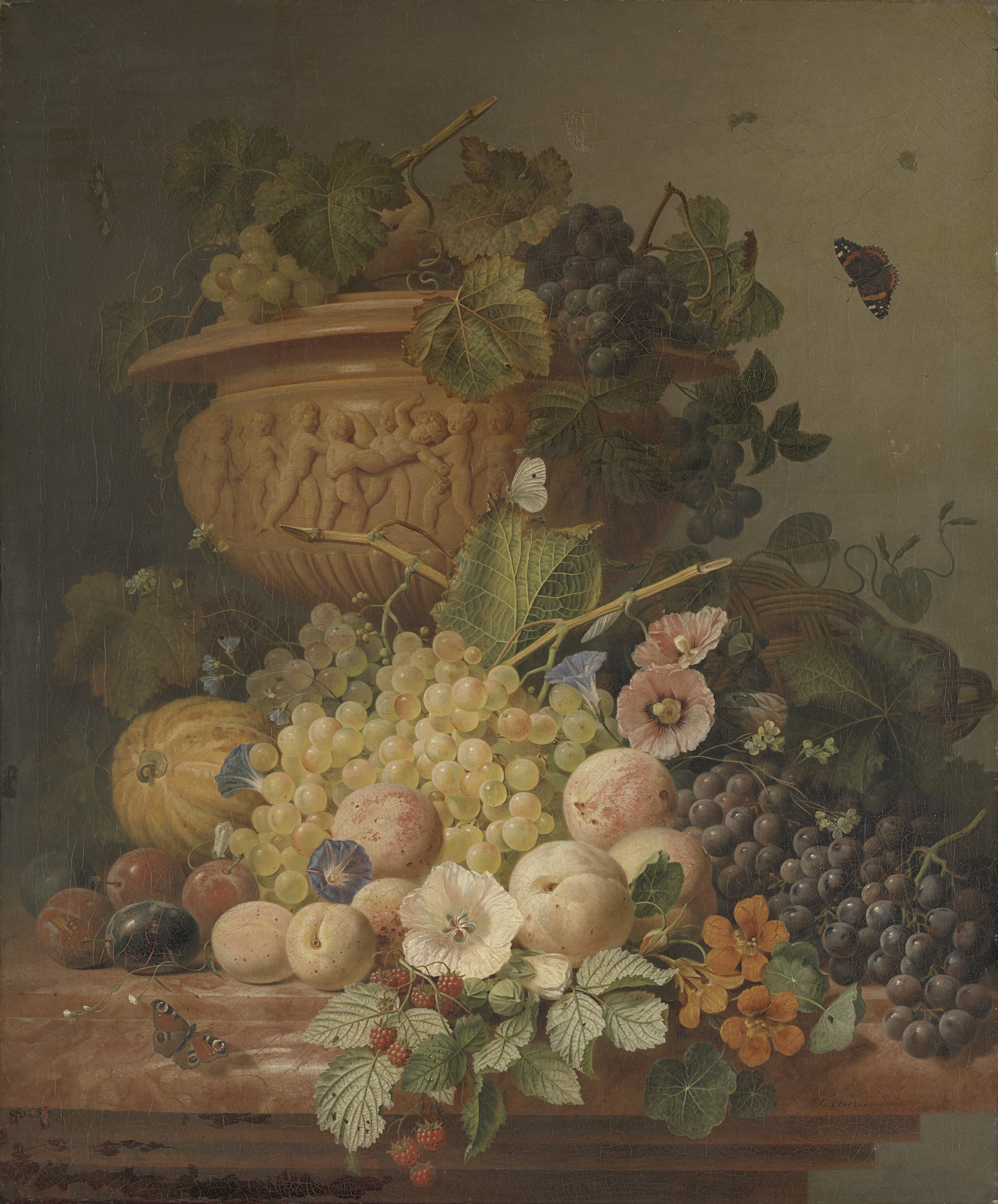
Still Life with Flowers and Fruit (1824)

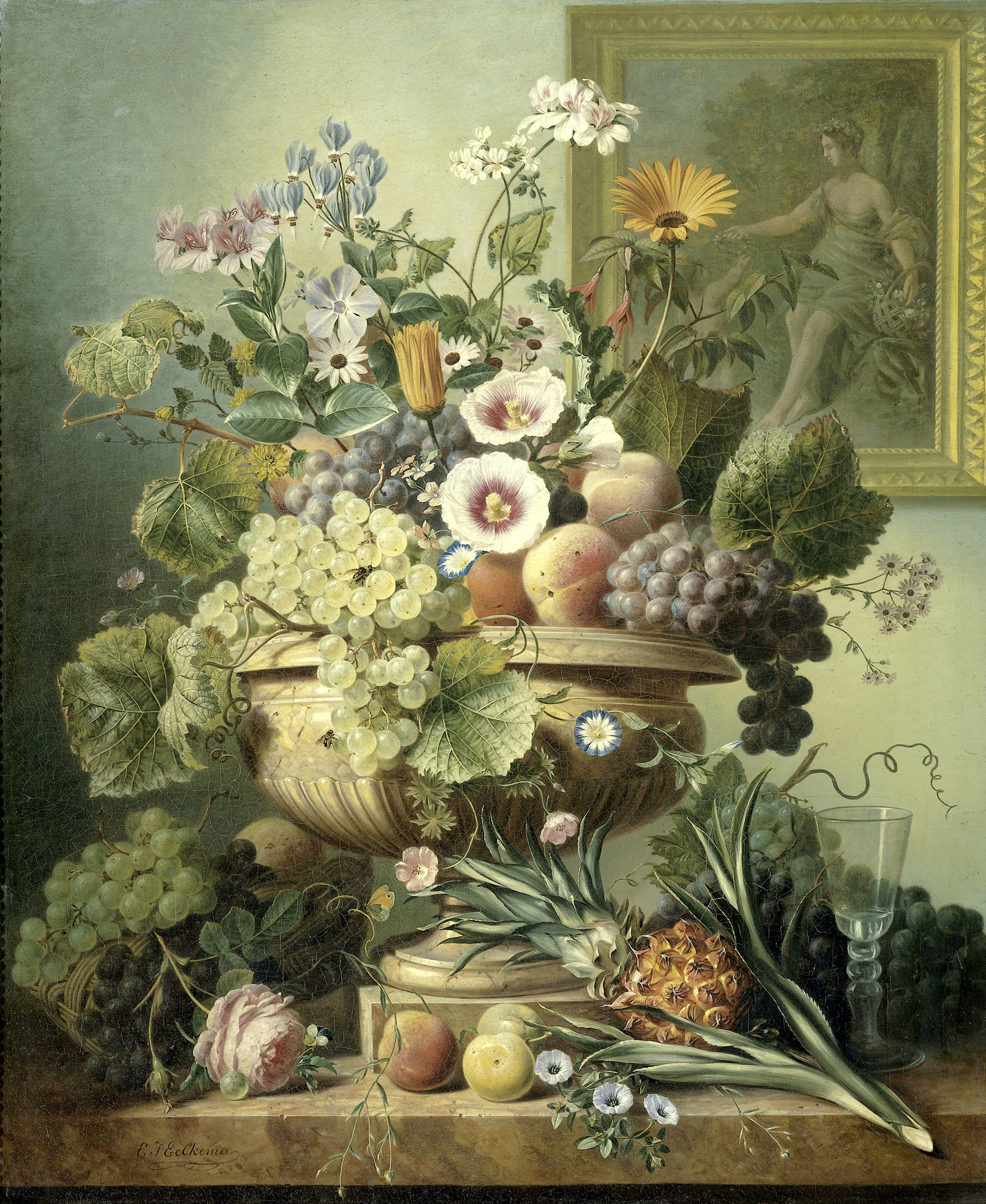
Still Life with Flowers and Fruit (c. 1815–1830)

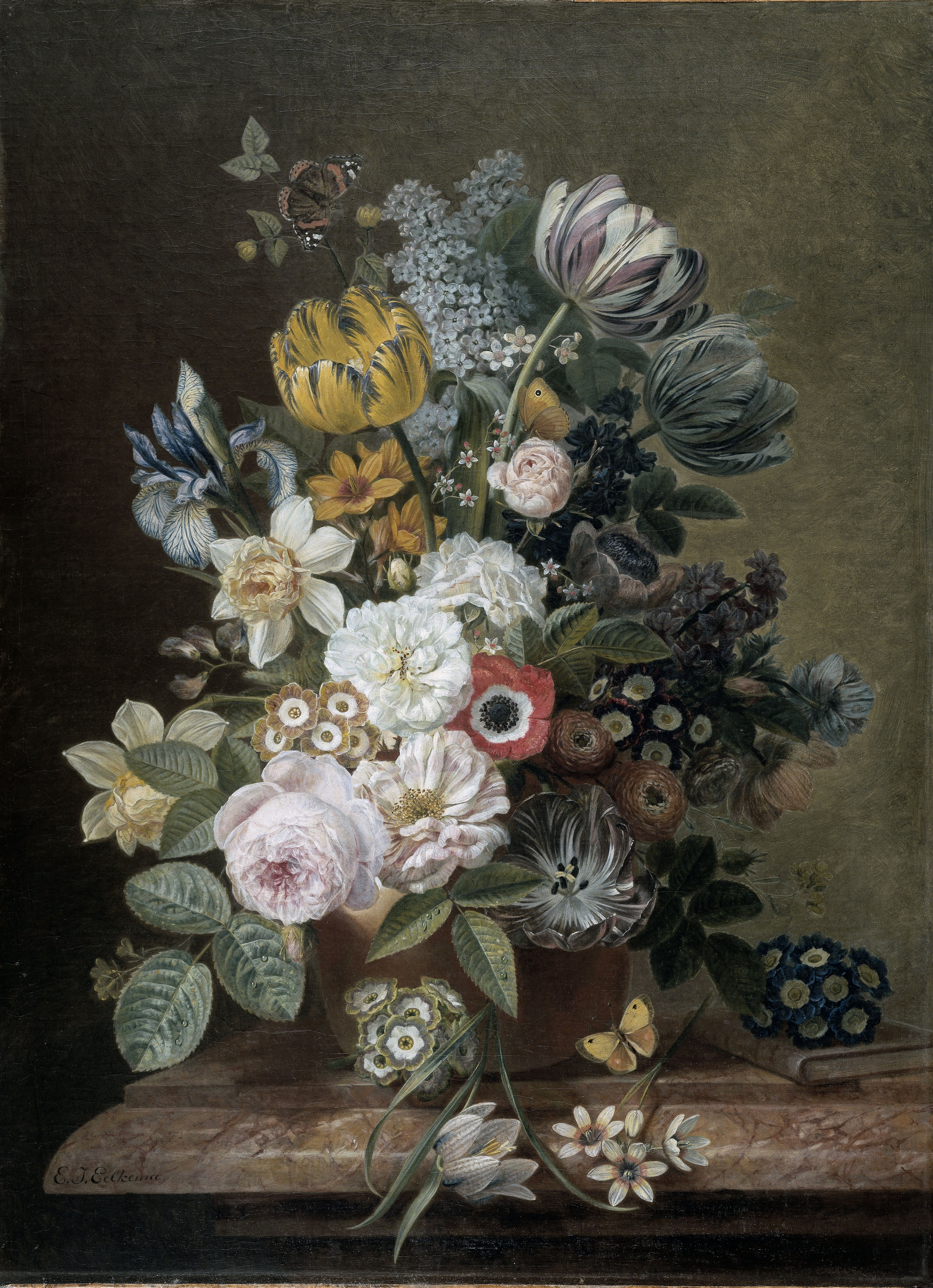
Still Life with Flowers (c. 1815–1839)
