= Plas Clough =

Country house in North Wales

Coordinates: 53.19836556861°N 03.4117685298248°W

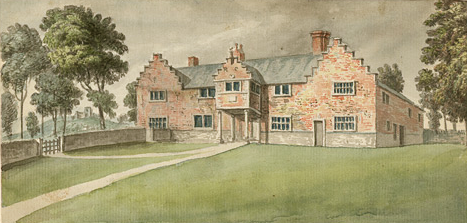
Plas Clough, watercolour by Moses Griffith about 1775

Plas Clough is a country house and Grade II* listed building at Denbigh, North Wales, built by Sir Richard Clough and begun about 1567.

Just to the north of the built-up area of Denbigh, one mile from the town centre, the house is set back on the west side of the A525 road to St Asaph, on a slight rise, about one mile south of Trefnant, and is surrounded by park land.

== Origins ==
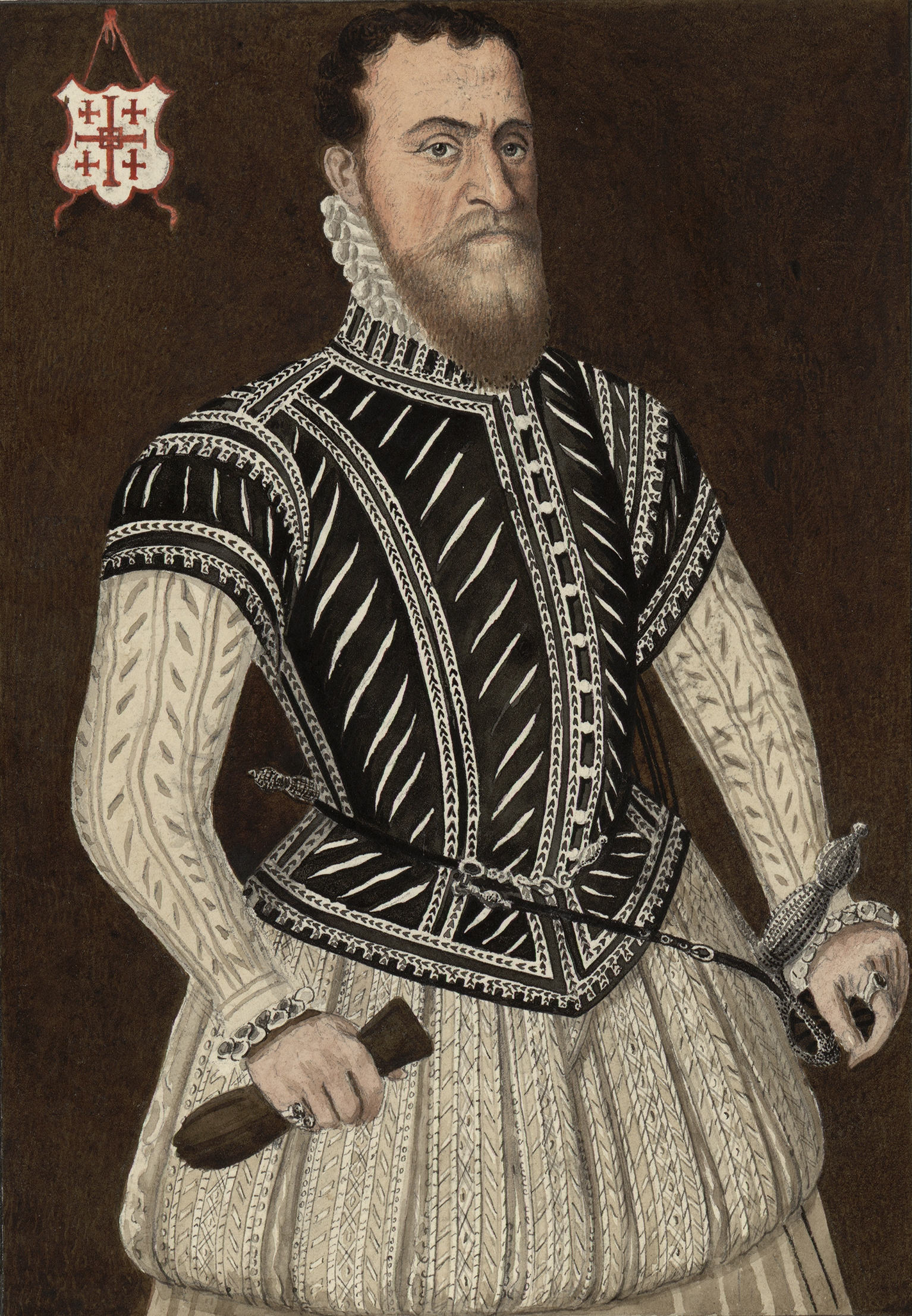
Richard Clough, by Moses Griffith

Clough, the son of a Denbigh glover whose career was launched thanks to being a notable boy chorister of Chester Cathedral, grew rich as Sir Thomas Gresham's agent and representative in Antwerp, in the Netherlands, between 1552 and 1567. It was Clough who suggested to Gresham the founding of the Royal Exchange in London.

In 1567, Clough married as her second husband Katheryn of Berain, heiress of estates in North Wales. He returned from Antwerp, soon beginning to build a new house, Plas Clough. About 1569, he also began Bachegraig, a few miles away, intended to become the centre of his business, while Plas Clough was to be a traditional rich man's country seat. Both buildings are important, as they were the first in Wales with brick walls supporting other floors above. Plas Clough also had the first stepped gables in Wales, a Flemish feature which was soon being copied in the architecture of North Wales.

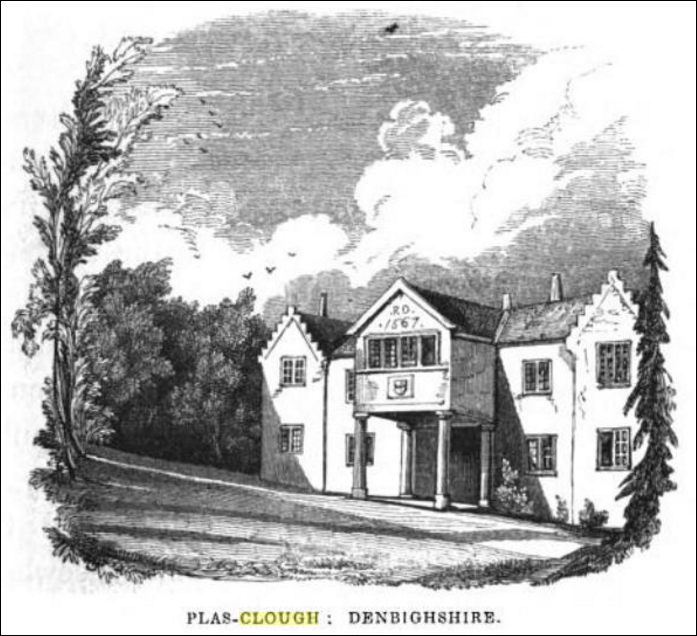
Engraving of Plas Clough in The Life and Times of Sir Thomas Gresham (1839)

Clough went to Hamburg on business and died there between 11 March and 19 July 1570. His heart was brought back to Wales and buried in St Marcella's Church, Denbigh.

Plas Clough was inherited by Richard Clough, Clough's son by his first wife, and remained in the Clough family for many generations.

== Architecture ==
The house is in the form of a U, with a partly-open courtyard behind. Built in the 16th century of brick, believed to have been imported from the Low Countries, the elevations were roughcast in the late 19th or early 20th century. The house has steeply pitched slate roofs and staged brick chimneys, with simple cornices. The front elevation has five bays and is nearly symmetrical. A three-bay central range is flanked by cross-wings with flush stepped gables. Framing the main entrance, the central bay has a large projecting porch, with a room above, also with a stepped gable, which now has plain bargeboards. Above an open lower stage, a jettied upper storey stands on Tuscan columns, which are of sandstone. A recessed plaque bears the painted arms of the Order of the Holy Sepulchre, of which Clough was a member. In the gable apex, above the main entrance, there are iron tie-plates in the form of the initials "RC" and the date "1567", but the date does not appear in a painting by Moses Griffith dating from the 1770s.

The front door, with six panels, dates from the 18th century and sits in a wooden door-case of four panelled pilasters, with side lights.

The house has unadorned sash windows, with twelve panes on the ground floor and nine panes above, and with twelve-pane windows on both floors of the gabled wings. Inside, the front range of the house is believed to have arch-braced roof trusses.

A single-storey extension has been added on the north side of the house, set back from the facade.
