= Richard Clough =

Welsh businessman

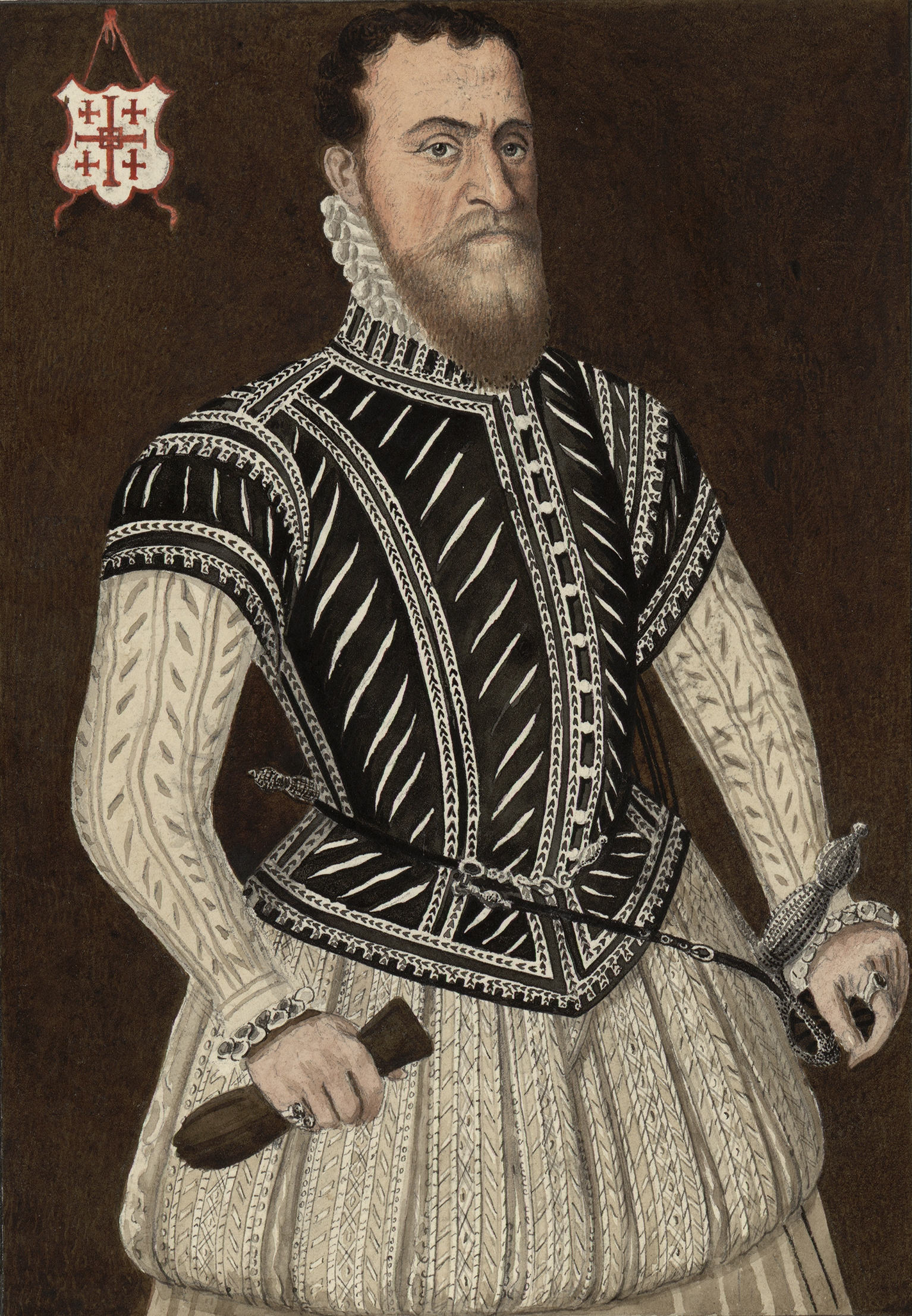
Sir Richard Clough (c. 1530–1570). Copy (c. 1775) of an Elizabethan portrait.

Sir Richard Clough (c. 1530–1570), known by his Welsh contemporaries as Rhisiart Clwch, was a merchant from Denbigh, north-east Wales, and an agent of Queen Elizabeth I of England.

The title of ‘Sir’ usually attached to his name is from his membership of the Order of the Holy Sepulchre. He did not use it in England after Queen Elizabeth I came to the throne in 1558, as she did not approve of the use of such foreign honours and titles, but the five crosses of the Order featured in his grant of arms.

== Early life ==
The son of a glover of Denbigh, Clough's fortunes were improved when he was noticed, as a boy chorister in Chester Cathedral, for his remarkable singing voice and was sent to court in London:

Some were so affected by his singing therein, that they were loath he should lose himself in empty air (church musick beginning then to be dis-countenanced) and persuaded, yea, procured his removal to London

By virtue of his visit to Jerusalem, he became a Knight of the Holy Sepulchre. Back in London, he became a factor (or manager) for Thomas Gresham and entered the Mercers' Company.

In Ancient and Modern Denbigh, John Williams says of Clough "By his Order, he probably was a Roman Catholic.

== Trader in Antwerp ==
In 1552, Clough was located in Antwerp, then the centre of North European commerce and banking. Here he met his wife Catherine Muldart, from that city. With her, he had a son, Richard. In 1558 he wrote an eyewitness testimony of the commemoration ceremony for Emperor Charles V in the Church of St. Michael and St. Gudula (now Brussels' cathedral). In 1561, he wrote to Gresham – his employer – with the suggestion that something along the lines of the Stock Exchange in Antwerp could be established in London. Gresham eventually took this idea up, founding the Royal Exchange, London, which opened in 1571. Before his early death, Clough played an important role in its development, providing finance and appointing Hendrik van Passe, the Flemish architect, to work on the building.

Many of Clough's letters to Gresham, up to twenty pages in length, were passed to the government for its use as intelligence and have survived and been used by historians. His eyewitness account of the Beeldenstorm or "Iconoclastic Fury" in Antwerp in 1566 is often quoted. He saw: "all the churches, chapels and houses of religion utterly defaced, and no kind of thing left whole within them, but broken and utterly destroyed, being done after such order and by so few folks that it is to be marvelled at." The Church of Our Lady in Antwerp, later made the cathedral: "looked like a hell, with above 10,000 torches burning, and such a noise as if heaven and earth had got together, with falling of images and beating down of costly works, such sort that the spoil was so great that a man could not well pass through the church. So that in fine [short], I cannot write you in x sheets of paper the strange sight I saw there, organs and all destroyed."

== Return to Wales ==
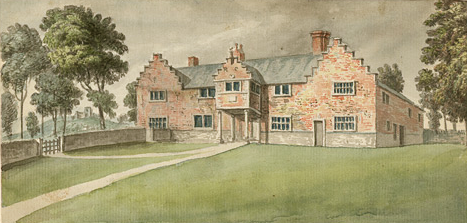
Plas Clough, Denbigh, watercolour by Moses Griffith c. 1775

Clough returned to Wales in 1565, and introduced Flemish building styles into the area with the building of two houses, Bach-y-graig and Plas Clough. He was so rich that in his home area his name became a synonym for riches: Efe a aeth yn Clough ("He has become a Clough"), once well known in Denbigh, was said of a man who had gained great wealth, while a Welsh bard of his time said his success in life had been Faen tros Iaem, or as speedy as a stone on ice.

He devised a scheme to dredge the River Clwyd and make it navigable.

Clough was active in astronomy, a patron of the map publisher Humphrey Llwyd of Denbigh and friends with Ortelius. In 1567, he was named "court master" of the London Merchant Adventures, now resettled from Antwerp to Hamburg. He died unexpectedly in Hamburg, some time between March and July 1570, while preparing to bring his second wife, Katheryn of Berain, home to the new house he had built for her at Plas Clough on the outskirts of Denbigh.

In local folk-tales of Tremeirchion, Clough is supposed to have been carried off by the Devil, never to be seen again, after being discovered by his wife discussing alchemy and other "godless" subjects at the house he had built for her.

== Flemish influence on houses in north-east Wales ==
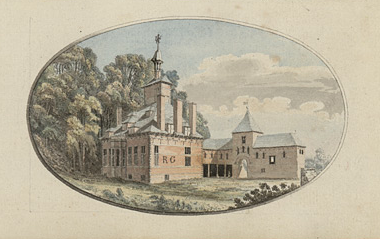
Bach-y-Graig, Tremeirchion c. 1775

The Renaissance comes to north-east Wales rather earlier with the building of Plas Clough, at Denbigh, and later Bach-y-Graig, at Tremeirchion near Mold, by Richard Clough, an extremely wealthy merchant, who established the Royal Exchange in the City of London with his business partner Sir Thomas Gresham. Bach-y-Graig has been identified as possibly derivative of Soulton Hall, the architectural project of Sir Rowland Hill, an associate of the Greshams who published the Geneva Bible.

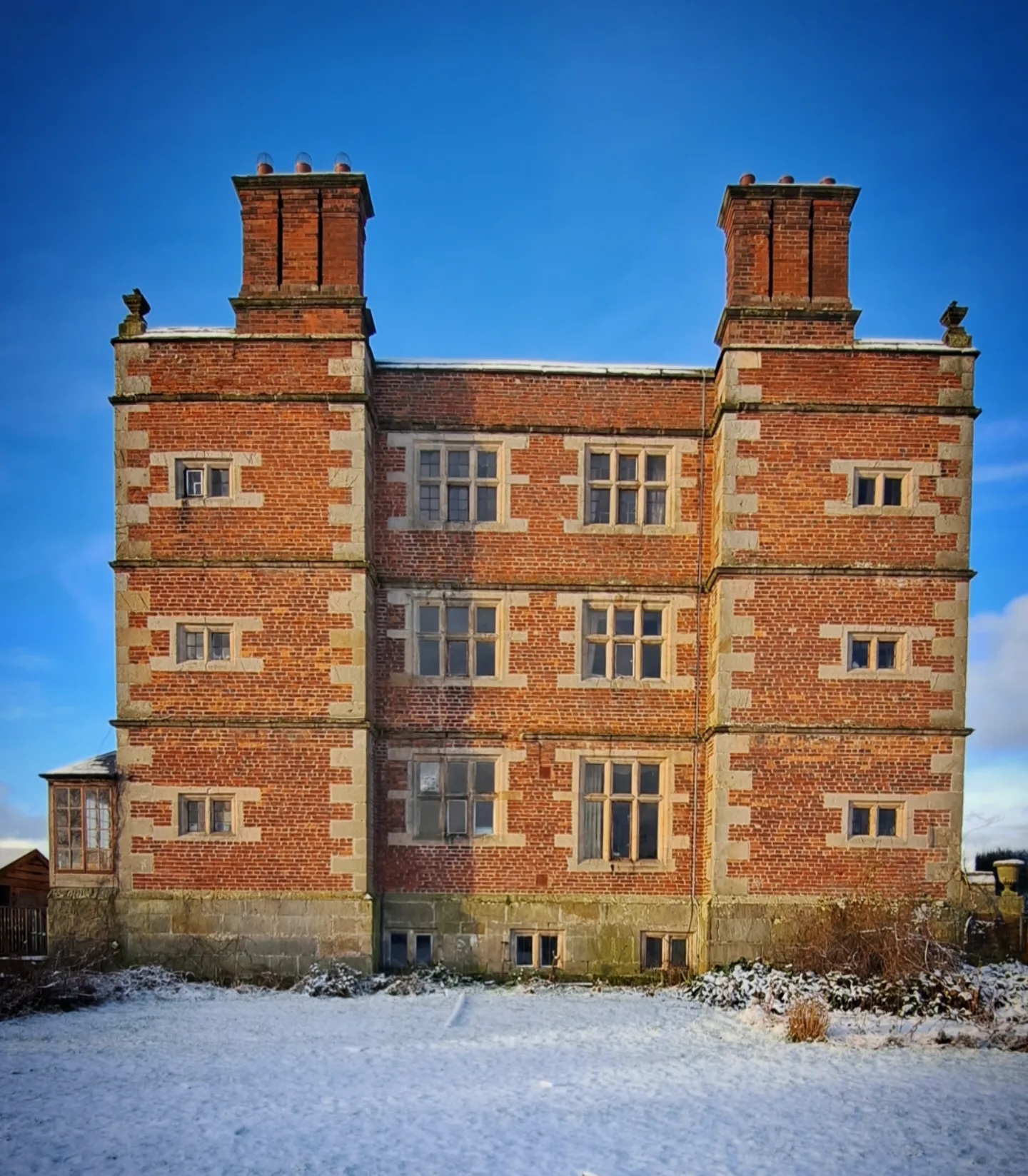
An indication of the appearance of the lost building at Bach-y-Graig may be found at Soulton Hall: it survives, though it lost its pyramidal roof in 1783.

Clough had lived in Antwerp where Hill and the Greshams were very active, and upon his return to Denbighshire in 1567 he built Bach-y-graig and Plas Clough. Bach-y-Graig appears to have served as a lodge-cum-office, with large associated warehouse ranges set around a courtyard, the while the more traditional Plas Clough was clearly intended from the outset as his main house. The houses were built in the Antwerp style by Flemish craftsmen and were the first brick houses in Wales.

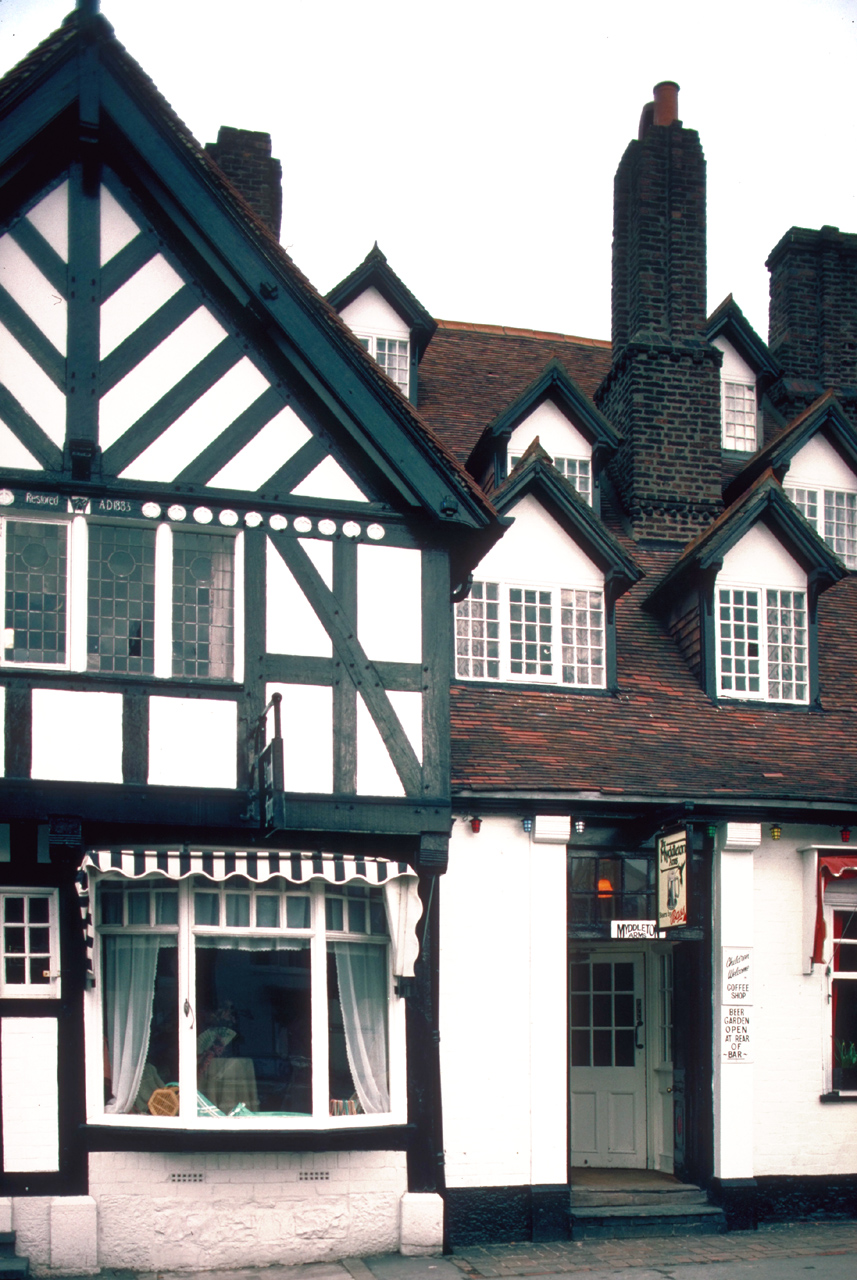
Ruthin Market Place. Myddelton Arms with triple dormers.

On the evidence of the similarities of these houses with the Renaissance buildings Antwerp and also the Royal Exchange in London, a strong case has been made out that their design should be attributed to the Flemish architect Henrick van Passe. The crow stepping on the gable, at Plas Clough near Denbigh, is typical of Flemish architecture and was widely copied on the grander houses that were being built in north Wales at this time, such as Plas Mawr (1576–85) in Conwy and Faenol Fawr (1597), near St Asaph. Peter Smith maps the distribution of houses with stepped gables which are concentrated around Denbigh and Ruthin, Conwy, the Menai Straits and the southern part of Merionethshire. He lists a total of 48 examples. Another feature seen at Bach-y- Graig was the arrangement of multiple dormer windows on the roof. Another property with three tiers of dormer windows that belonged to Clough was the Myddelton Arms in the market place at Ruthin. Tiered dormer window were also copied on the roof of the older portion of the Manor House in Llanfyllin in Montgomeryshire.

== Bibliography ==
- Sir Richard Clough — "The Most Complete Man"
- Arnade, Peter J., Beggars, Iconoclasts, and Civic Patriots: the Political Culture of the Dutch Revolt, Cornell University Press, 2008, ISBN 0-8014-7496-5, ISBN 978-0-8014-7496-5
- Spicer, Calvinist churches in early modern Europe, Manchester University Press, 2007, ISBN 0-7190-5487-7, ISBN 978-0-7190-5487-7
