= Roland de Velville =

Possible/likely illegitimate child of Henry VII

Sir Roland de Velville
- Constable of Beaumaris Castle, Captain of Beaumaris Castle and Town, Anglesey (Ynys Môn), Wales
- Born: 1471/4; Brittany; under Francis II, a duchy of France (per Beauclerk-Dewar et al., granted Letters of Denization, 1512)
- Died: 25 June 1535; Beaumaris Castle, Wales
- Buried: Chapel of the Blessed Virgin Mary, Beaumaris Castle
- Spouse: Agnes Griffith
- Issue: Grace de Velville; Jane de Velville (m. Robert Thomas ap Robert of Berain)
- Father: Henry VII of England (rumoured)
- Mother: unknown to historians (per Beauclerk-Dewar et al., Sir Roland's heraldry reflected known parentage)

Sir Roland de Velville (1471/74 – 25 June 1535) was a Breton-born English soldier and government official who is theorised as the illegitimate son of King Henry VII of England by "a Breton lady whose name is not known", or as a favoured member of the court of Henry VII and later recipient of beneficences, brought home to England with 28-year-old Henry after his exile in Brittany, an adolescent "of unknown parentage", and so a possible or likely illegitimate son, with formal historical opinion undecided.

== Birth and origins ==
It appears that Velville is a French translation of the Breton name, Cosquer (sa maison appellée en langue bretonne du Cosquer, ou de la Vieuxville en langue françoise, Archives Départementales des Côtes d'Armor - 2 E 422 Famille Lanloup, Kerbouric (de), p. 2). The Breton for 'old' ('vieille' or 'vieux' in French) is 'cos' or 'coz' and the Breton for 'village manor' or 'village' ('ville' in French) is 'ker' - sometimes spelled 'quer' or 'kaer' historically. The Cosquer (also sometimes Coasker or variants of) family lived at the Château de Rosanbo, near Lanvellec, Brittany, and their descendants in the female line, the Marquises of Rosanbo, still live there today. The coat of arms of this family is D'or au sanglier passant de sable (Or [gold], a boar passant sable [black]), which were contemporaneously attributed to Roland de Velville.

A Roland de Cosquer was recorded in Caouënnec-Lanvézéac in 1426. This says that in 1476 the manor of Cosquer was held by Yvon de Quélen, who was probably the daughter of Typhaine de Quélenec, daughter of the viscount of Fou en Rosnoën. In his 'Henry VII: The Maligned Tudor King' (Amberley Publishing, 2016), Tony Breverton notes that Henry Tudor, when he first arrived in Brittany, was in the care of Jean de Quélenec, Viscount of Faou. This points to a possible derivation of the name Velville; namely, that Roland de Velville's mother was a relation of the Jean de Quélenec, Viscount of Faou, and took his name from their manor of Cosquer. Thus, this circumstantial evidence points to a possible relationship with the de Quélen and de Quélenec families, whereas the heraldic evidence (the boar passant sable) points to the family of Cosquer of Rosanbo (see above), but these families might have been connected.

Velville's quartering (per Siddons) of Argent, a lion rampant gules, crowned or appears to be the arms of the family of Goyon or Gouyon, a very distinguished family that eventually succeeded to the Principality of Monaco. His quartering of Argent three chevrons sable might be the family of Comenan (or Comelan). His quartering of Argent three bars gules might be the family of Trogoff, or possibly Kerautem. His quartering of Argent three bars sable might be the family of Kerimel. His quartering of Argent a lion rampant gules might be the family of Testard or Coëtredrez. These are all Breton families.

Les chevaliers bannerets du duché de Bretagne au XVème siècle also refers to other families of the name:

On voit aussi Pierre de la Vieuville qualifié chevalier banneret dans une montre du 14 septembre 1413. Nous ne croyons pas que ce seigneur appartienne à la famille de la Vieuville de Bretagne, ancienne, il est vrai, mais peu richement possessionnée. Il est plus sûr de l'attribuer à une famille du même nom et considérable de l'Artois, dont les armes sont fascées d'or et d'azur, et à laquelle appartenaient Jean et André de la Vieuville, chevaliers en 1377, et peut-être aussi Jean de la Vieuville, chevalier de l'ordre du roi et bailli de Gisors en 1498. La famille de la Vieuville de Bretagne est distincte de celle du Cosquer ou du Coskaër, qui, à la fin du XVème siècle, francisa son nom en le changeant en celui de la Vieuville. - Il a existé en Bourgogne, selon Olivier de La Marche, une ancienne famille de bannerets, appelée de la Vieuville. Pierre de la Vieuville aurait pu aussi appartenir à une famille de Bourgogne du même nom, qui possédait au XVème siècle le fief de bannière de la Vieuville.

See also Etienne Pattou, Guillaume de La Vieu(x)ville & autres familles de La Vieuville, La Viefville, etc. (racineshistoire.free.fr/LGN/PDF/La-Vieuville.pdf, accessed 7/3/2018).

Peter Beauclerk-Dewar and Roger Powell note that while not having official position or office, de Velville was a courtier and "favourite of the king, participating in numerous jousts and accompanying the king out hunting." He saw military service in Brittany in 1489, and likely in France with the King in 1492, was knighted in 1497 after the Battle of Blackheath, and was one of a small group of knights individually rewarded for their efforts by Henry VII.

Beauclerk-Dewar and Powell further state that historical records regularly place de Velville at royal tournaments marking significant royal events (marriages, visits of foreign monarchs) of the Court of Henry VII, in particular his jousts, from 1494 to 1507; in May 1509 he was appointed to attend Henry VII's funeral as a knight of the Royal Household, and in June to participate in the royal jousts in celebration of the accession of Henry VIII. Shortly thereafter, he was appointed Constable and Captain of Beaumaris Castle, Anglesey (Ynys Môn, in Wales) in 1509, a position he held until his death.

== Marriage, family and death ==
Historian Alison Weir notes "he married a Welshwoman, and had issue" [i.e., a child or children]. His wife Agnes (née Griffith), was widow of Robert Dowdyng and daughter in the powerful Welsh family of William (Gwilym) Griffith Fychan and so brother to Sir William Griffith, a Chamberlain of North Wales; Agnes gave him two daughters, Grace and Jane, the latter who, in marriage to Tudor ap Robert Vychan, gave birth to Katherine Tudor, in Welsh Catrin o Ferain (who is sometimes referred to as "the mother of Wales"). de Velville died on 25 June 1535, cause unknown, and was buried in the Chapel of the Blessed Virgin Mary in Beaumaris.

== Poems about de Velville ==
The Welsh bards referred to Velville as follows:

Robert Evans (undated poem in Christ Church MS. 184, f.74t in praise of Sir John Salisbury of Lleweni, Catherine of Berain's son and Velville's great-grandson):

Orwyr Sr Rolant euraid
Ar aer ar tir o ryw y taid
Dyna lin y brenhinoedd
Bur at hen waed brytain oedd

Great-grandson of gilded Sir Roland
And the heir and the possessor of the land from the line of his ancestor [literally 'his grandfather'],
That is the lineage of kings,
He was purely descended from the ancient blood of Brittany.

2) William Cynwal (Christ Church MS 184, f. 220v, – poem addressed to John Salisbury in 1586 or 1587):

Oth nain bv lwyth ai yn y blaen
Bwrw at Sr Rplant Brytaen . . .
Dy lin o waed Brenhinoedd
Ac o ryw Jeirll holl Loygr oedd

From your grandmother you issued from a tribe who excelled,
Sir Roland of Brittany was your ancestor . . .
Your line issued from the blood of kings,
And was of the race of the earls of all England.

3) Owain Gwynedd (undated poem in Christ Church MS. f. 262v in praise of John Salisbury):

Doe iachau /n/ ffest wchion ffyrdd
O waed felfel yd filfyrdd
Carwr hael i ceir yr hydd
Car pavn mwyn ceirw pen mynydd

4) Lewys Dwnn (poem (1602) in praise of the four sons of Sir John Salisbury (1602) in Enid Roberts (ed.), Gwaith Siôn Tudur (Cardiff, 1980), p. 42):

Ach bron y goron a’i gwaed

Of a line near to the crown and of its blood.

5) Velville was referred to as a man of a kingly line in an elegy composed on his death in 1535 by the Anglesey bard, Dafydd Alaw (quoted (in Welsh) in D. C. Jones, The Bulkeleys of Beaumaris. 1440-1547, Anglesey Antiquarian Society and Field Club Transactions (1961 ), p. 8). The quotation also refers to Velville as of earl's blood (...gwr o lin brenhinoedd ag o waed ieirll i gyd oedd,), which, assuming an allusion to Tudor ancestry is intended, presumably refers to Henry VII's father, Edmund Tudor (d. 1456), Earl of Richmond, though Henry VII was Earl of Richmond from birth, being born posthumously.

The assertion by Professor Chrimes (see Henry VII of England) that the 'allegation' of Velville's royal paternity was originally made in 1833 by that enthusiastic but frequently inaccurate amateur historian of Anglesey, Angharad Llwyd (Professor S. B. Chrimes, Sir Roland de Veleville, Welsh Historical Review, 1967) is therefore false. The 'assertion' was current during Velville's lifetime, some 300 years earlier than Chrimes claimed.

With regard to Velville's appearance:

Sr Rowland villavile or delaville was the naturall sonne as is reported of the duke of brittaine but most authors are of opinion he was naturall sonne of hen E of Richmond whilst he was in britaine & was after H7: Paradyn makes no mention of any base sonne that the duke of Britaine had & that the duke was litle slender & black: & Sr Rowland was tale [tall] very stronge & fair much like to Kinge H8 . . . (Harley MS. 1971, 22, written either by Randle Holme I (1570/1-1655) or by Jacob Chaloner (d. 1631)).
