= Fries Museum =

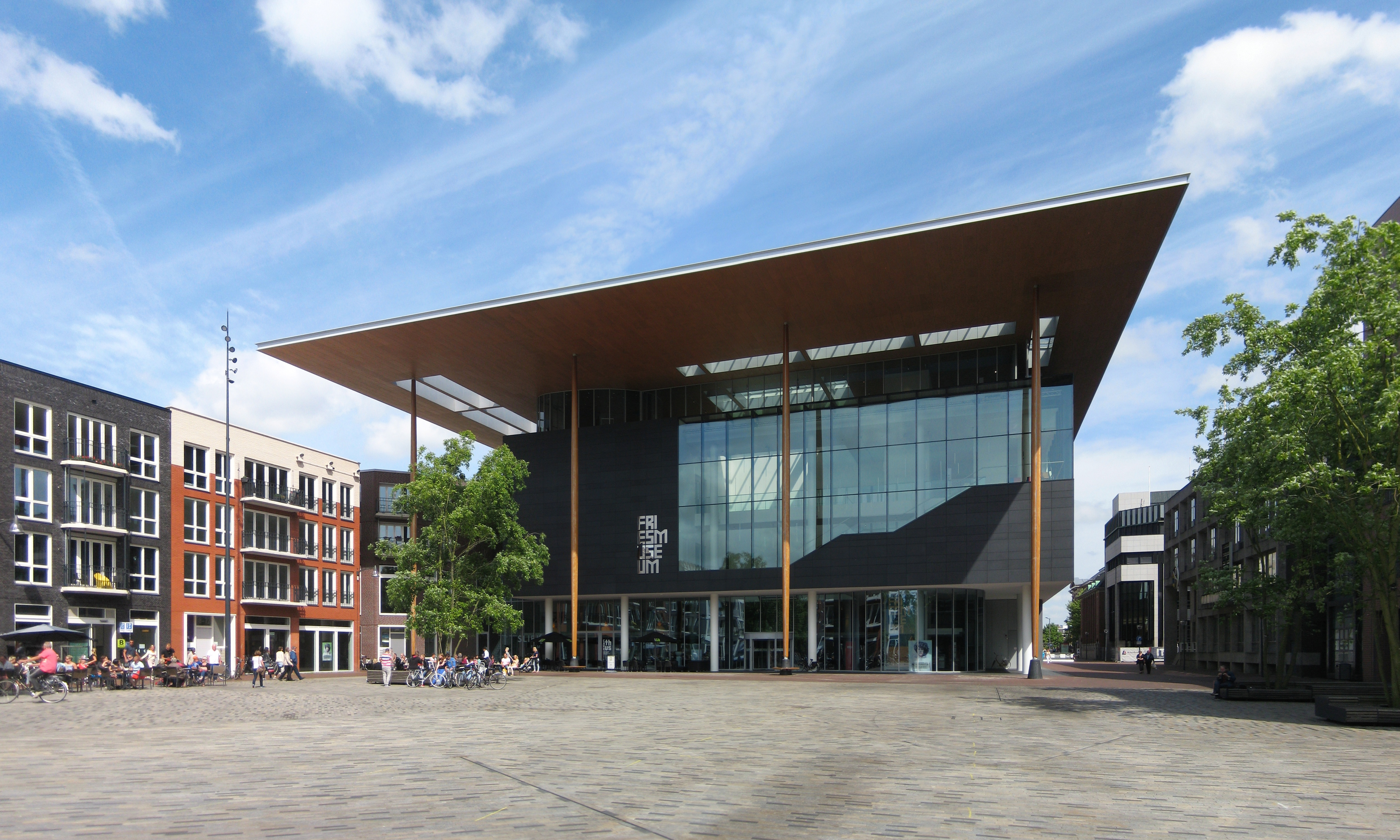
- The Fries Museum in 2014
- Established: 13 April 1881; 145 years ago
- Location: Wilhelminaplein 92, Leeuwarden, Netherlands
- Coordinates: 53.1996°N 5.79444°E
- Type: Museum
- Website: www.friesmuseum.nl/en/

The Fries Museum (Frisian Museum) is a museum in Leeuwarden, Netherlands centered on Frisian art and history. It has won the Global Fine Art Award which is sometimes nicknamed the Museum-Oscar.

== History (1881–2012) ==
The museum was founded on 13 April 1881 by the "Provincial Friesch Genootschap ter Beoefening van Friesche Geschied-, Oudheid- en Taalkunde", a society for the preservation of Frisian culture that itself was founded in 1827 and needed a place to exhibit the various artifacts it had gathered together. In the early decades this local museum on the Turfmarkt, Leeuwarden, an offshoot of the Antiquarisch Kabinet van Friesland, was focussed on typical Hindelooper goods and other Frisian curiosities that had been collected by the local preacher-writer Joost Hiddes Halbertsma. The first historical exhibition of 1877, however, which had over 1500 items on loan and attracted many visitors, led to an unexpected profit of 17,000 guilders, and the museum was able to purchase a new property on the Koningstraat, the former "Eysinga house", where the museum opened its doors in 1881.

A further important boost to the collection occurred when William III of the Netherlands bequeathed many portraits from the collection of the Stadhouderlijk Hof. In 1892 a new wing was built to house the growing collection, with a special viewing room for the paintings with a large skylight.

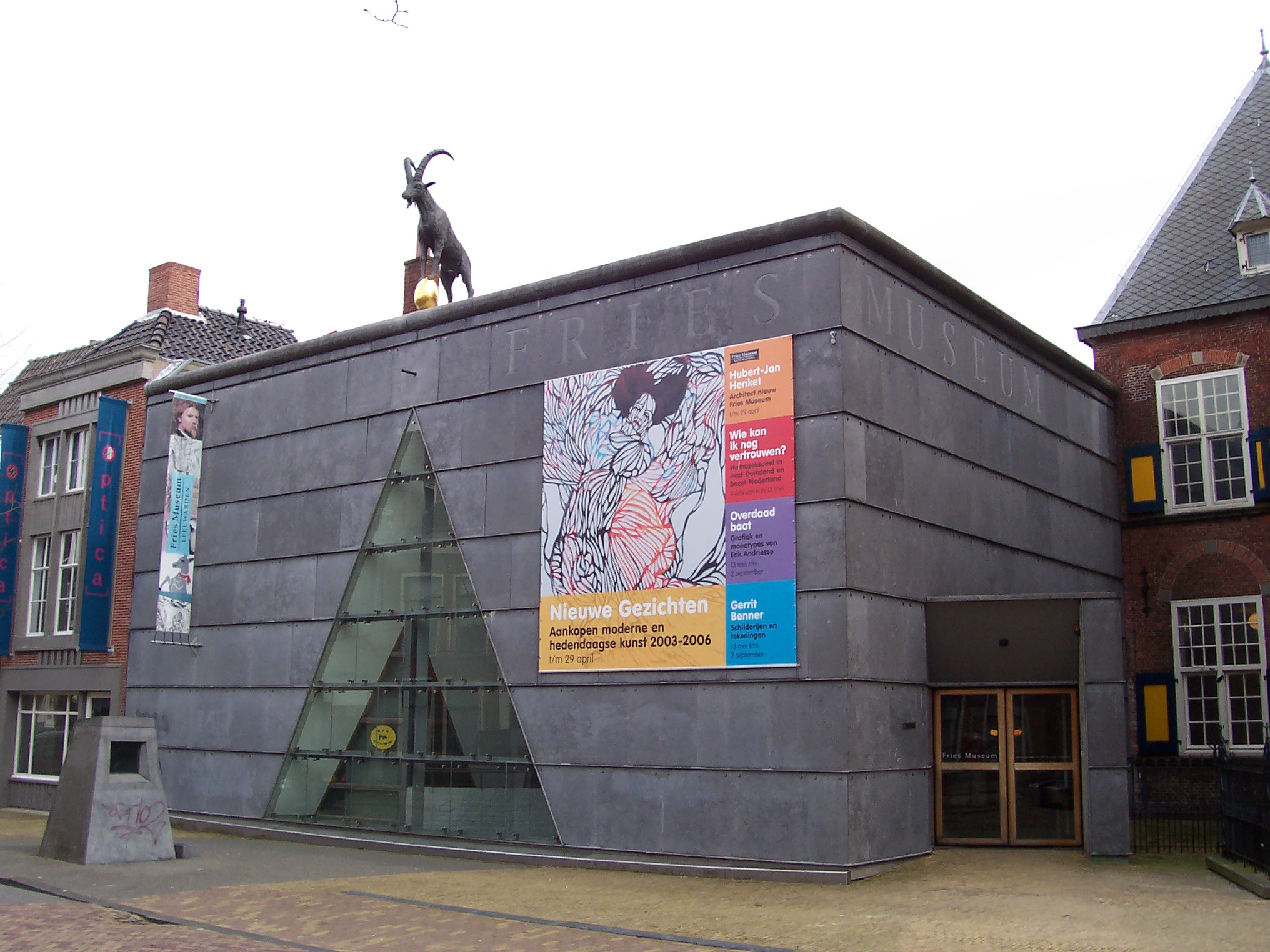
Former entrance to the Fries Museum on the Turfmarkt in Leeuwarden

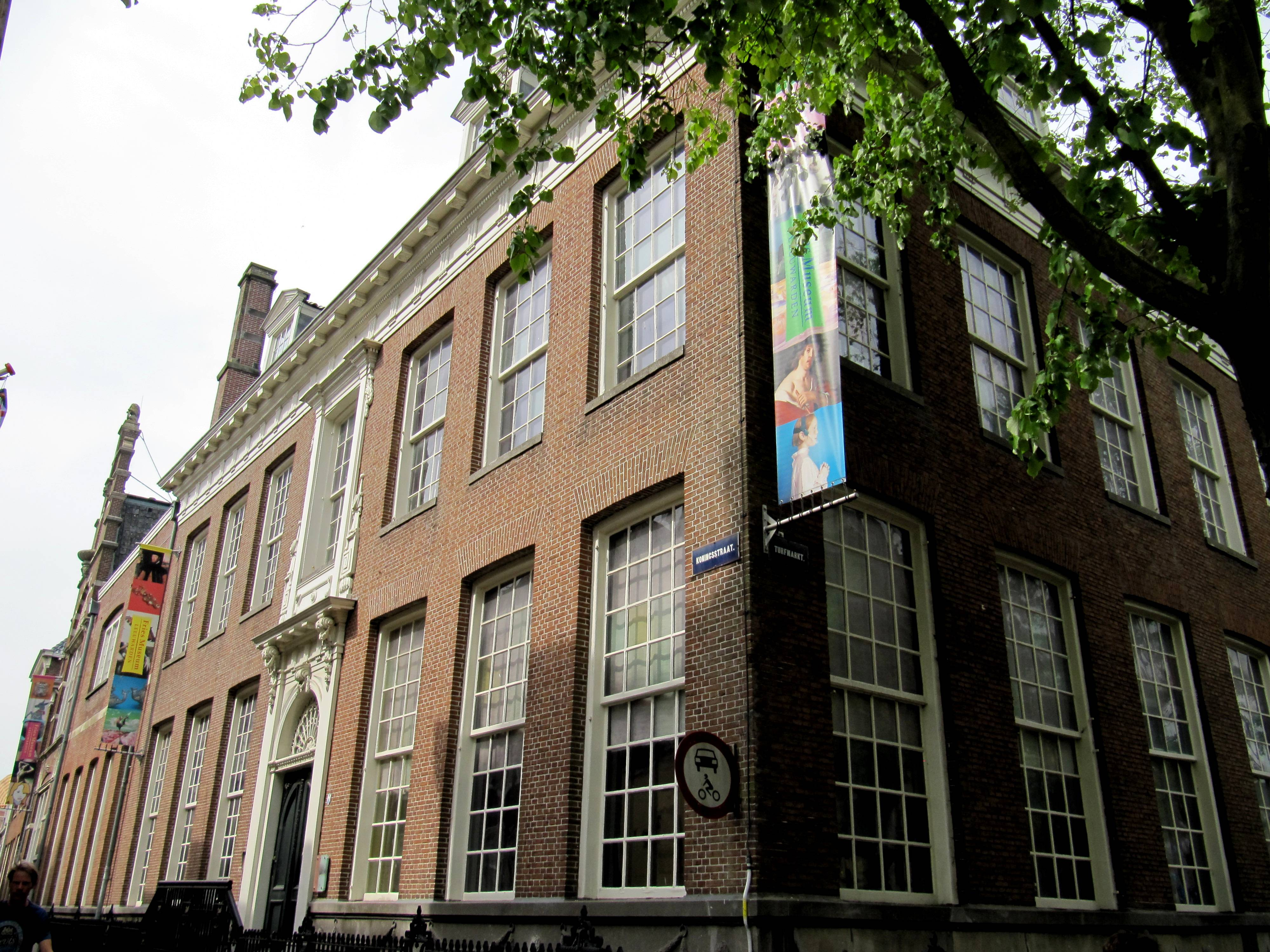
Eysinga house, a rijksmonument

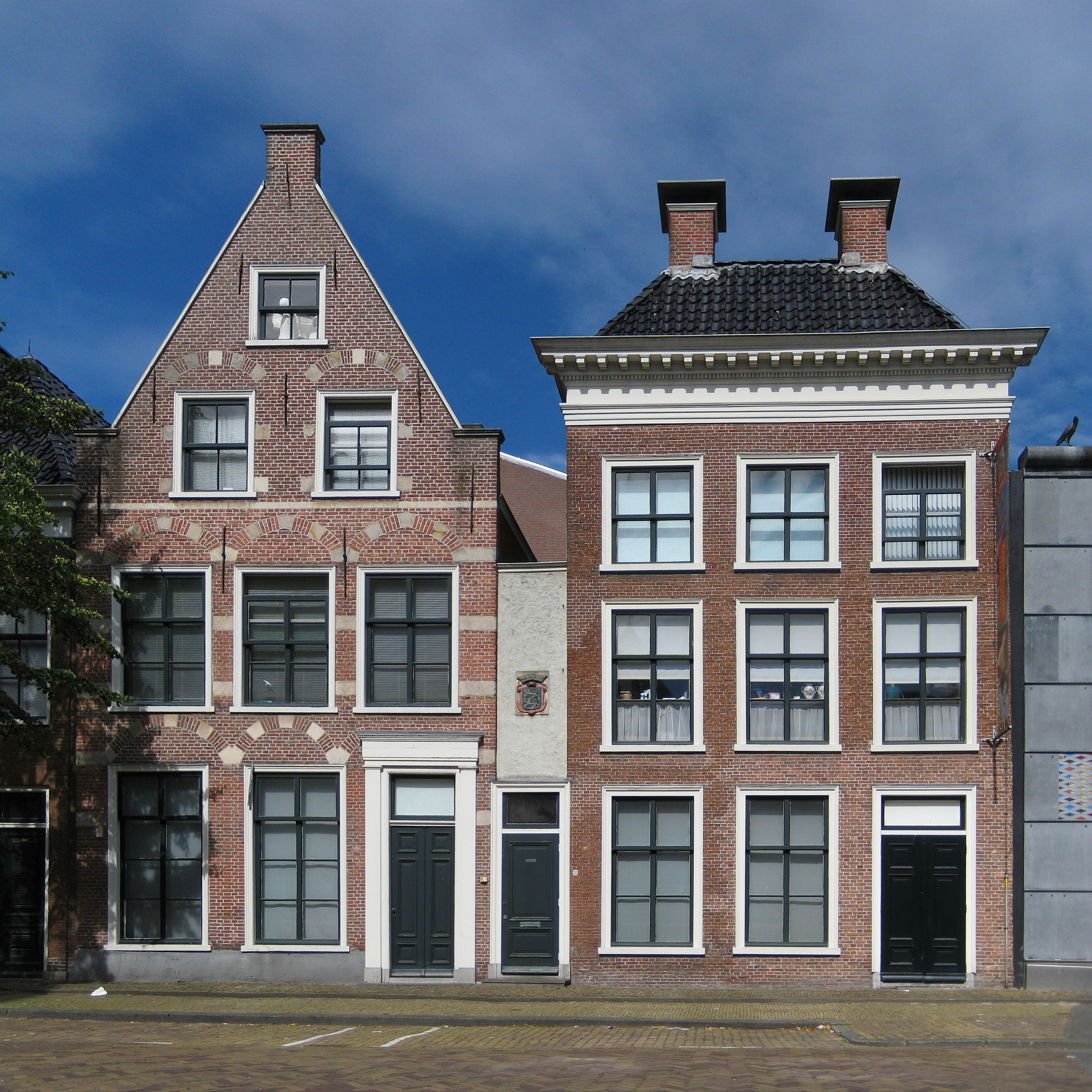
Turfmarkt 18-20, was part of the museum, a rijksmonument

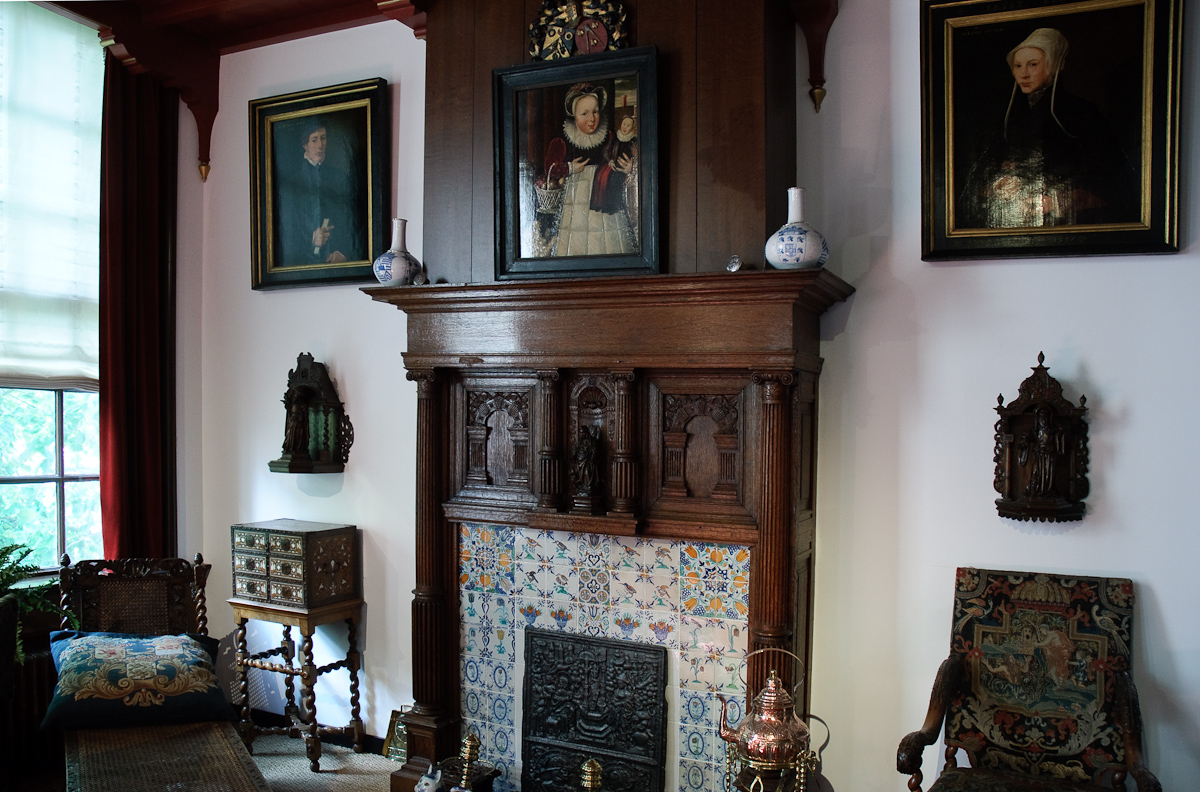
Bishop's room

== New building ==
The Frisian architect Abe Bonnema initiated the new building. When he died in 2001, he left 18 million euros to the Fries Museum. The new museum on Wilhelminaplein was designed by Hubert-Jan Henket. On 13 September 2013, the building was opened by Queen Máxima.

== Collection ==
The collection of the Fries Museum consists of 1 million objects and is dedicated to arts, crafts, and history from the years 1200 to 2000. Around 8000 objects are currently on display in the museum.

The most iconic objects in the museum are the Hindelooper Room, the Popta Treasure (Frisian silverware) and the legendary sword of Grote Pier.

The Mata Hari hall is dedicated to the life of the dancer and spy, who was born in 1876 in Leeuwarden as Margaretha Zelle. The museum has the largest collection of works by the local late 16th century portrait painter Adriaen van Cronenburg. The collection contains paintings by notable painters such as Wigerus Vitringa, Wybrand de Geest, Eelke Jelles Eelkema, Lawrence Alma-Tadema, Gerrit Benner and Jan Mankes.

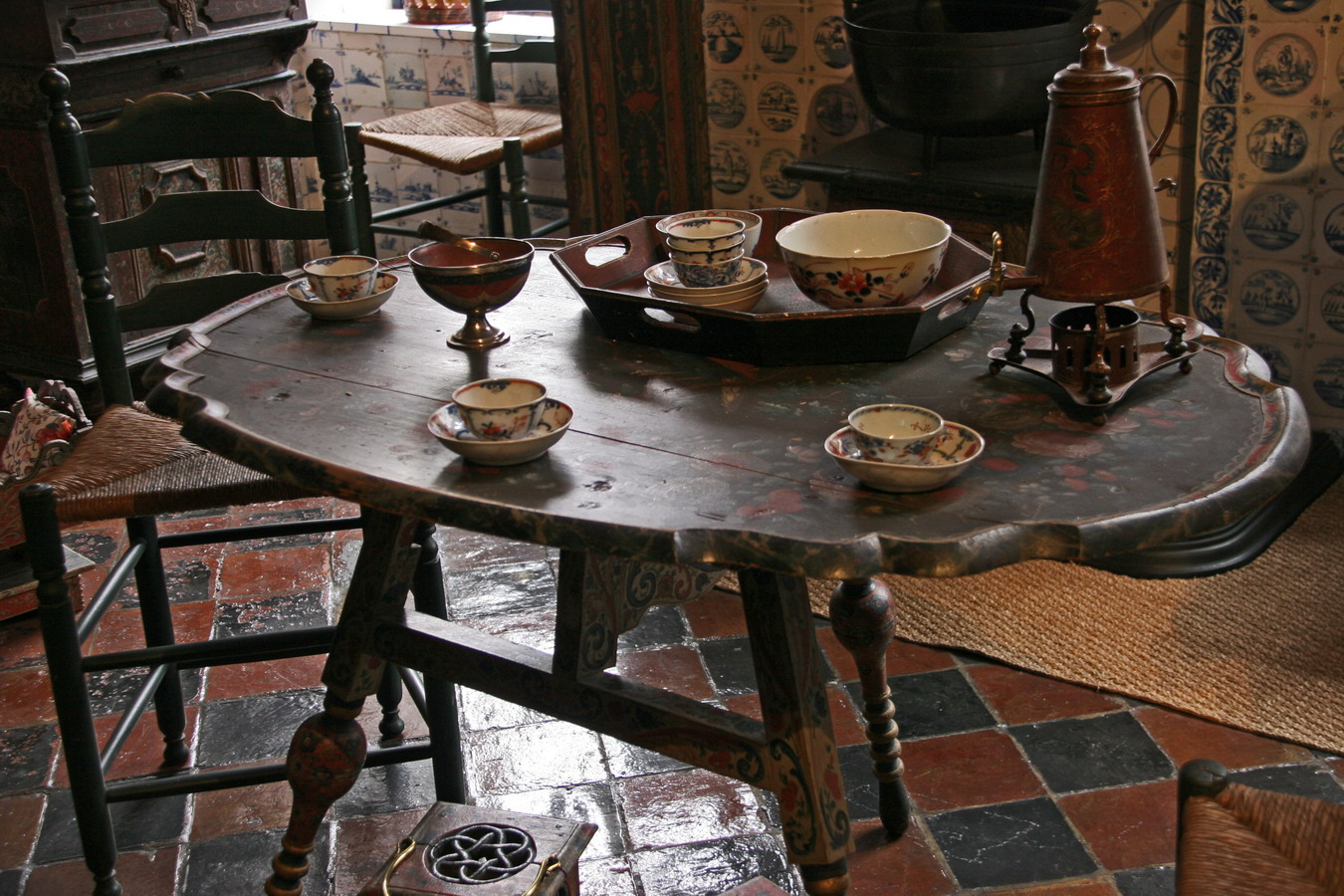
Hindelooper Room

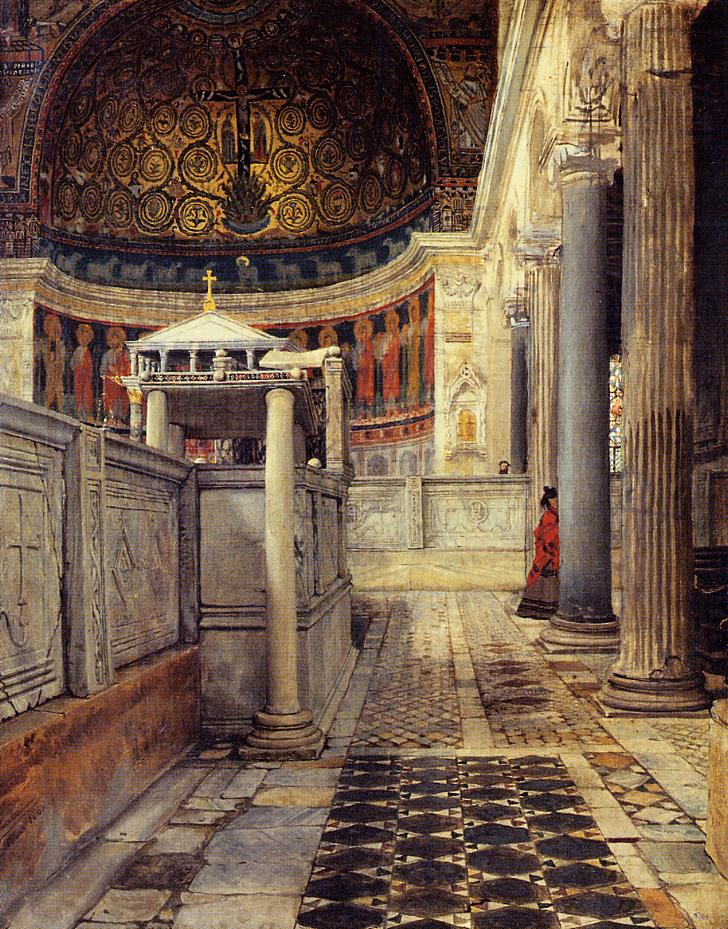
Interior of Basilica of San Clemente al Laterano (1863) by Lawrence Alma-Tadema

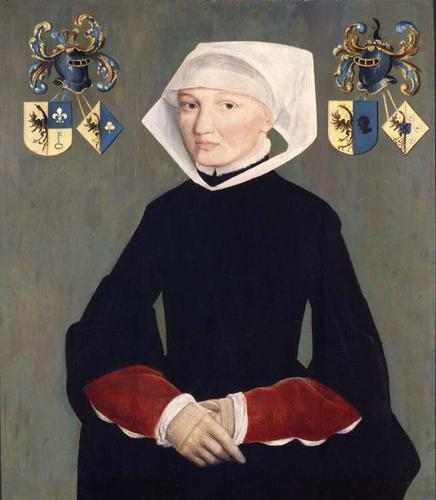
portrait of Frouk van Haerda by Adriaen van Cronenburg

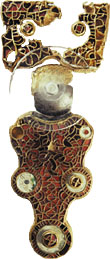
Fibula of Wijnaldum
