= Katheryn of Berain =

Welsh noblewoman

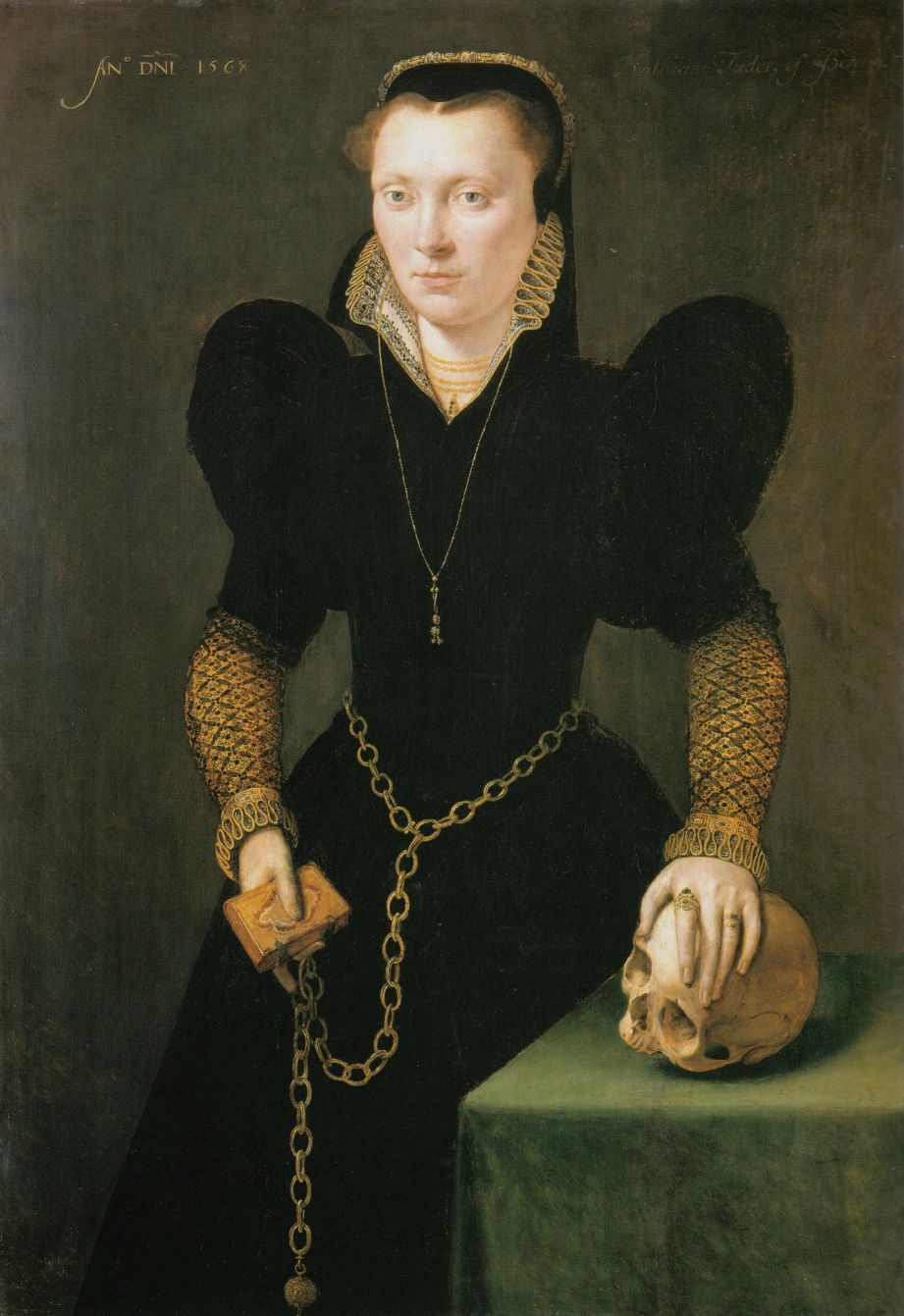
Portrait of Katheryn of Berain by Adriaen van Cronenburgh c.1568, in the National Museum Cardiff

Katheryn of Berain (Welsh: Catrin o Ferain) (born 1535 - Latin eulogy; died aged 56 on 27 August 1591), sometimes called Mam Cymru ("mother of Wales"), was a Welsh noblewoman noted for her four marriages and her extensive network of descendants and relations.

== Life ==
She is sometimes referred to as Katheryn Tudor, her father being Tudur ap Robert Vychan and her mother Jane Velville. Her maternal grandfather Sir Roland de Velville (1474 – 25 June 1535), is said to have been a natural son of King Henry VII of England by a Breton lady. Katheryn, who is said to have been a ward of Queen Elizabeth, was the heiress to the Berain and Penymynydd estates in Denbighshire and Anglesey.

=== John Salusbury ===
At the age of 22, Katheryn married John Salusbury, Esquire, son of Sir John Salusbury of Llewenni (died 1578), of the prestigious Salusbury Family of Lleweni, Denbighshire. According to John Ballinger, this was probably a "child marriage". There is said to be a letter written by young Salusbury while at Westminster School in which he mentions his wife. He died in late May or early June 1566. They had been married for nine years and had two sons:

- Thomas Salusbury (c. 1564 – September 20, 1586). Executed as a traitor for his involvement in the Babington Plot. He married his stepsister Margaret Wynn (daughter of Katheryn's third husband, Maurice Wynn from Maurice's first marriage), and their daughter, Margaret, eventually inherited Berain,
- John Salusbury (c. 1565/66 – 1612), married Ursula Stanley, illegitimate daughter of Henry Stanley, 4th Earl of Derby and Jane Halsall. One of their two surviving sons was Sir Henry Salusbury, 1st Baronet, the first of the Salusbury Baronets of Lleweni (1619). Henry was the father of Anne Salusbury, the wife of Arthur Stanhope and ancestor of all the Earls of Chesterfield from the fifth Earl. Shakespeare's poem The Phoenix and the Turtle was published in a collection called Love's Martyr (1601), dedicated to Katheryn's son John Salusbury, who was knighted by Queen Elizabeth in June 1601.

=== Sir Richard Clough ===
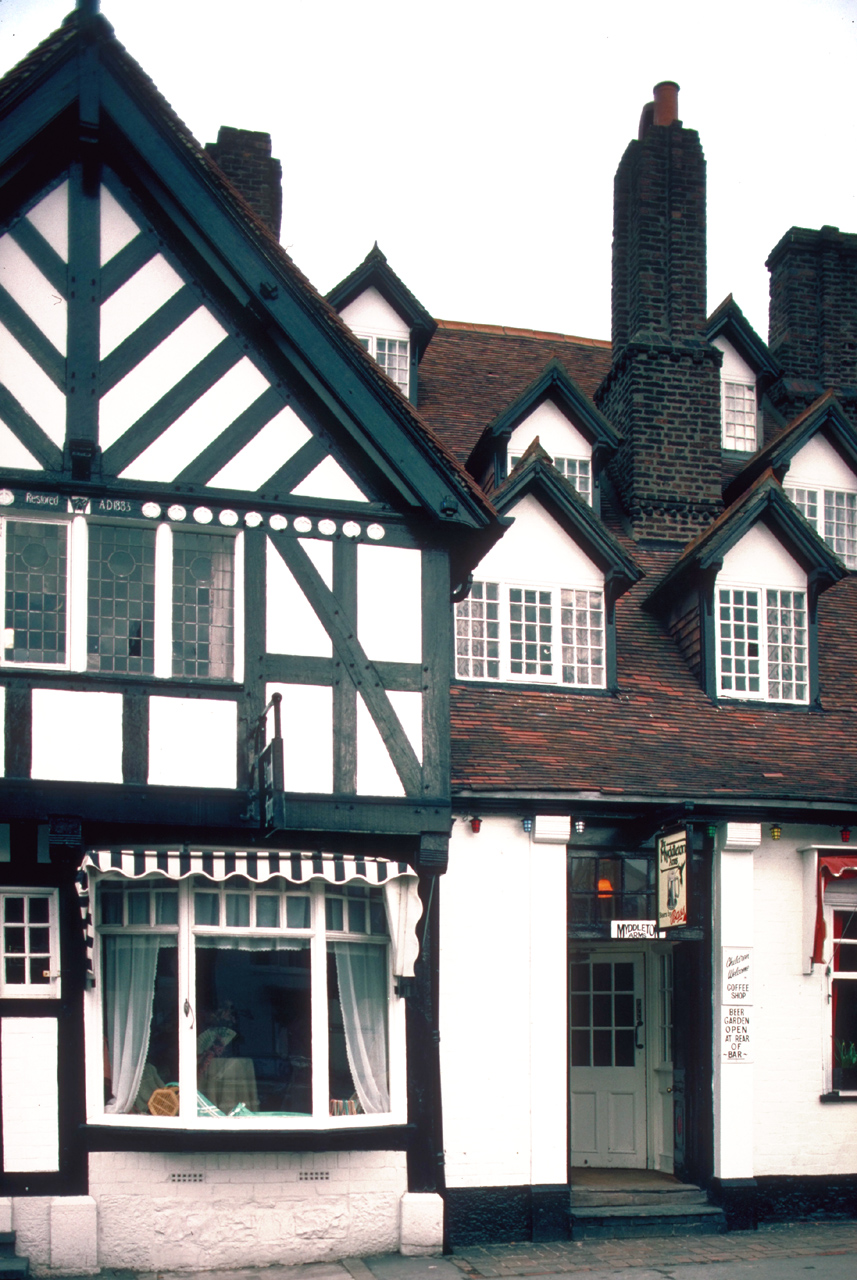
Ruthin Myddelton Arms, built in the 16th century in the Flemish style by Richard Clough, who worked in Antwerp.

A story recorded by Askew Roberts for his History of the Gwydir Family states that Katheryn was accompanied to the funeral of her first husband, by Maurice Wynn, who is said to have proposed marriage to her upon leaving the church. Roberts states that the widow declined the offer on the basis that she had already promised to marry Sir Richard Clough, who had proposed to her on the way to the church service. However, Katheryn offered to marry Maurice Wynn "when there was a vacancy".

Katheryn did indeed marry Richard Clough, an extremely wealthy merchant, who established the Royal Exchange in the City of London with his business partner Sir Thomas Gresham. Clough had lived in Antwerp, and upon his return to Denbighshire in 1567 he built two houses, Bach-y-graig and Plas Clough. The houses were built in Antwerp style by Flemish craftsmen and were the first brick houses in Wales. Upon Clough's death Plas Clough was inherited by Richard Clough, his son by his first wife.

Katheryn had two daughters by Clough:

- Anne Clough (b. 1568), married Roger Salusbury, a brother of John Salusbury and paternal uncle to her older half-brothers. Their only son was John Salisbury. Anne inherited "Bach-y-graig".
- Mary Clough (born 1569). Married William Wynn, a relative of Maurice Wynn.

The Cloughs lived for a time in Antwerp, where Katheryn's portrait was painted, probably by Adriaen van Cronenburgh, as the National Museum now suggests, or perhaps by Lucas de Heere, a previous attribution. Within six years of their marriage, Sir Richard Clough died in Hamburg aged forty. He was probably poisoned because of his work as a spy for Queen Elizabeth I.

=== Maurice Wynn ===
Katheryn then married Maurice Wynn of Gwydir. Wynn was Sheriff of Caernarvonshire and left Katheryn an extremely wealthy woman when he died.

Katheryn had a further two children by Maurice Wynn:

- Edward Wynn, who married Blanche Vaughan.
- Jane Wynn, who married Simon Thelwall.

=== Edward Thelwall ===
Katheryn's fourth and last husband was Edward Thelwall of Plas-y-Ward, who outlived her.

The Welsh poet Robert Parry wrote an elegy on the occasion of Katheryn's death. Her many descendants included Hester Thrale and the 18th century explorer John Salusbury.

== See also ==
- Mam Cymru
