= Mam Cymru =

Mam Cymru (English: Mother of Wales) may refer to:

- 16th century Welsh noblewoman Katheryn of Berain also known as Katheryn Tudor.
- National personification of Wales, also called Dame Wales used in cartoons, most notably by Joseph Morewood Staniforth.
- Isle of Anglesey.
