= Adriaen van Cronenburg =

Painter from the Northern Netherlands

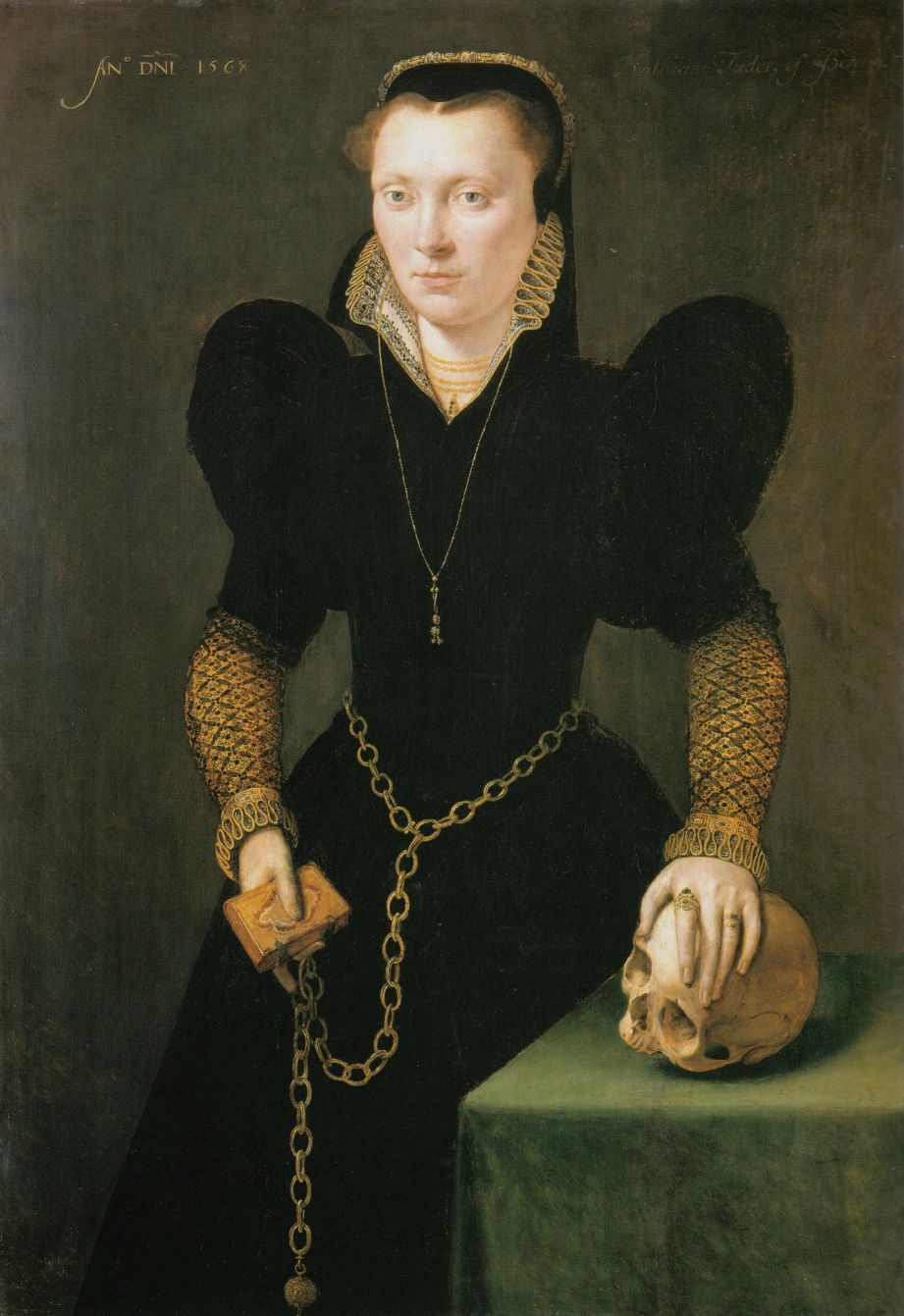
Adriaen van Cronenburg, portrait of Katheryn of Berain, 1568, National Museum Cardiff.

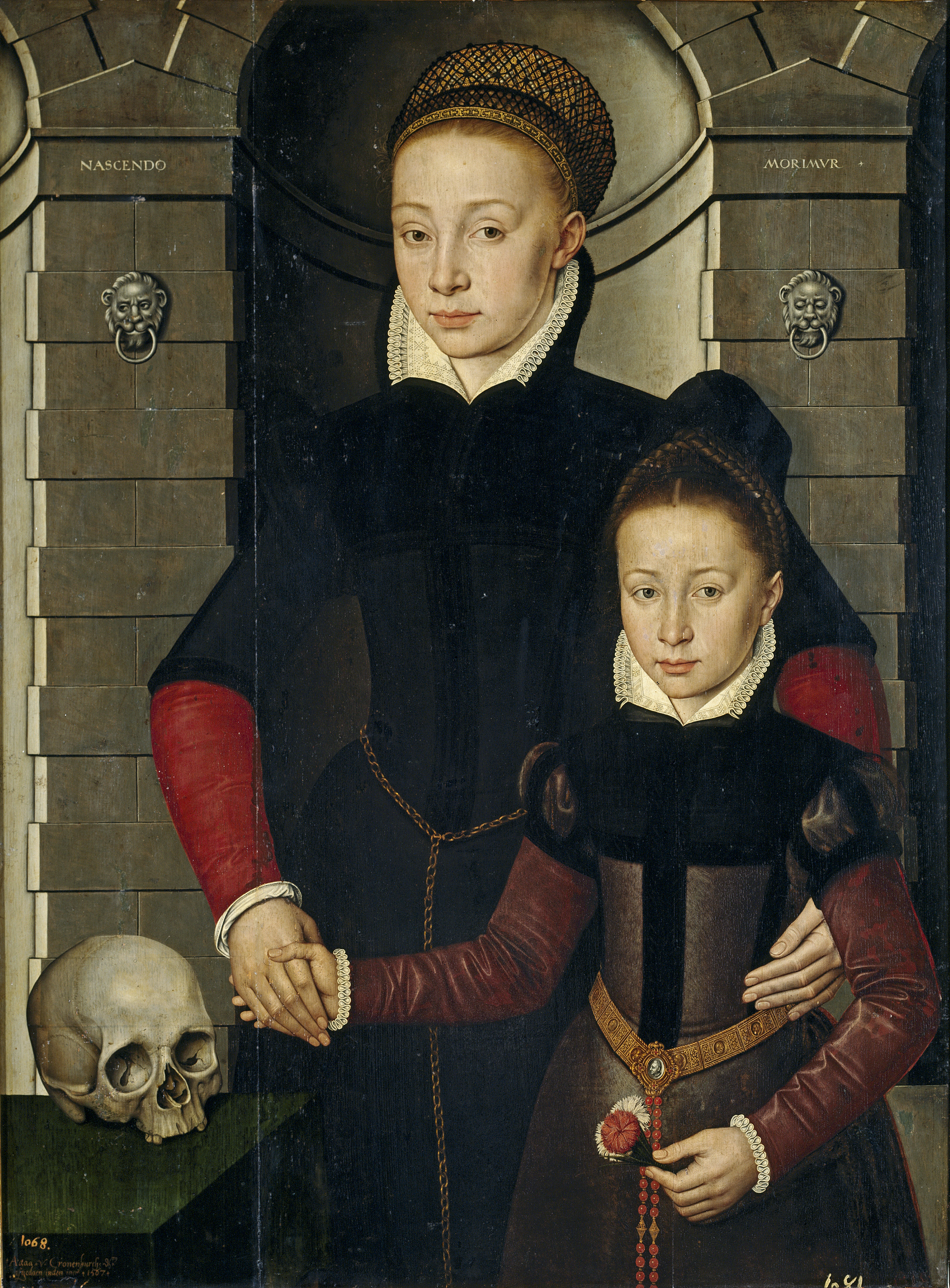
Adriaen van Cronenburg, portrait of a lady and a young girl, 1567, Museo del Prado.

Adriaen van Cronenburg (also Cronenburgh, Cronenburch) (Schagen, c. 1525 – Bergum, after 1604) was a Northern Netherlandish painter. He produced mainly portraits.

Cronenburg was active between about 1547 and 1590, working in the provinces of Friesland and Groningen. He also spent some time in Belgium, especially in Leuven and Antwerp, where he painted the portrait of Katheryn of Berain now in National Museum Cardiff.

Cronenburg's cousin married into two aristocratic families in succession, and it is likely through this connection that he became secretary of Tietjerksteradeel in 1567. Following the Union of Utrecht, Cronenburg left Friesland in 1580 due to his refusal to give up Catholicism. He was allowed to return to Friesland in 1592 and settled in Bergum. The last signed works known are from 1587 and 1590.

The identity of Adriaen van Cronenburg was established by A. Wassenbergh, formerly the director of the Fries Museum, based on his unusual signature, A.a.a.a. van Cronenburg.

For many years, the illogical signature was 'corrected' to 'Anna van Cronenburg,' but Wassenbergh showed that the four a's were a rebus for Adriaen. In Dutch A.a.a.a., read as 'A, three a's,' is pronounced 'A, drie a'en,' or Adriaen.
