= Albertus Jonas Brandt =

Dutch painter

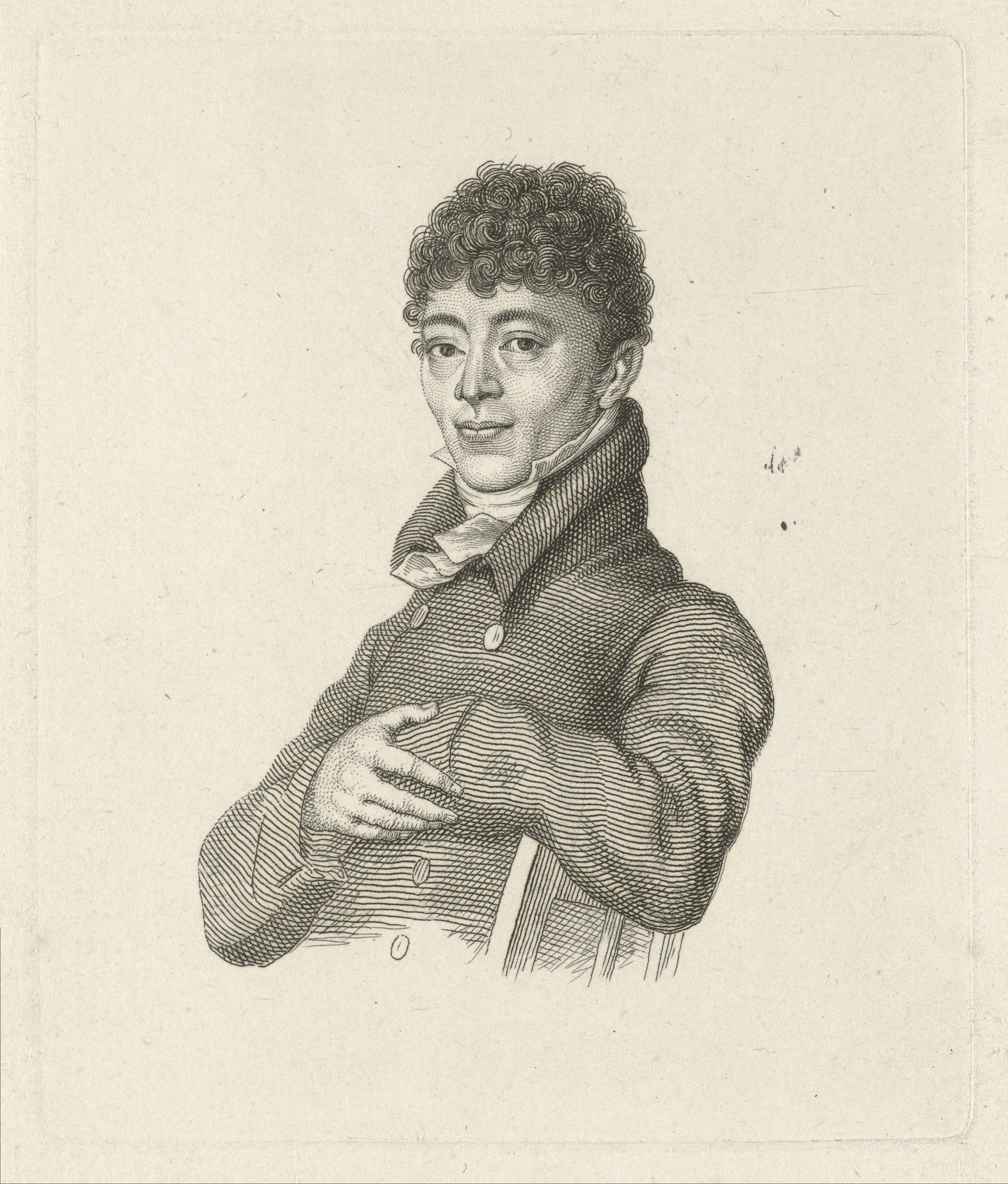
- Born: 25 November 1787; Amsterdam, Dutch Republic
- Died: 12 February 1821 (aged 33); Amsterdam, Netherlands

Albertus Jonas Brandt (25 November 1787 – 12 February 1821) was a Dutch still life painter. He was the son of a book printer and seller. While working in his father's shop, he became a pupil of J. E. Morel. After Morel's death in 1808, he spent two years with the painter G. J. J. van Os, (who was a son of Pieter van Os). When van Os moved to France in 1810, Brandt taught himself, copying Jan van Huysum. In 1814 and 1816 he won prizes in the academy Felix Meritis. Soon he became famous, painting dead game, fruit, and flowers.

Brandt died of tuberculosis. His collection of drawings, paintings and tools were auctioned on 29 October 1821. The painting Flowers in a Terracotta Vase started by Brandt was finished by Eelke Jelles Eelkema.

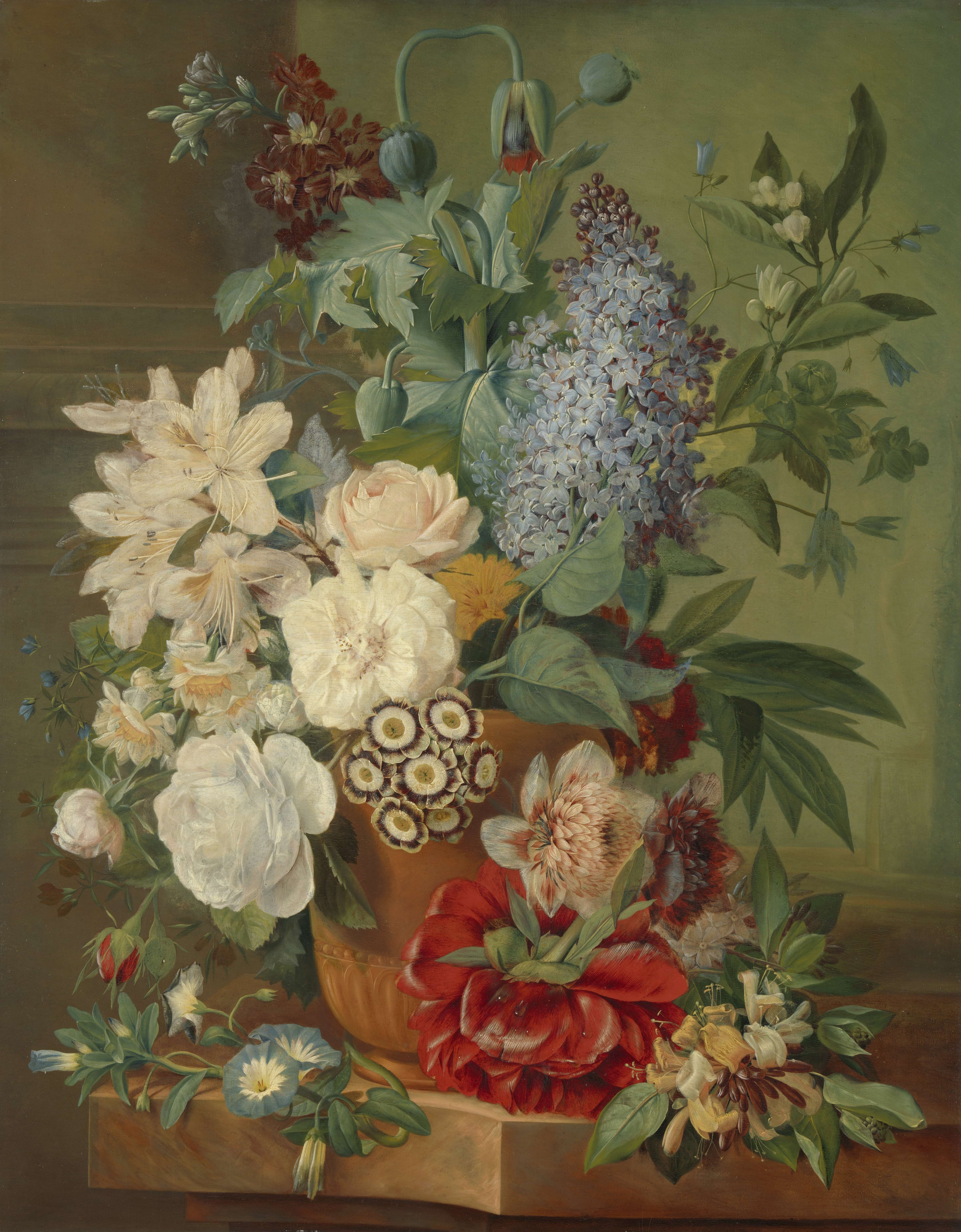
Blooms in a Terracotta Vase - (Bloemen in een terracotta vaas) - Painting by Brandt, finished by Eelke Jelles Eelkema after Brandt's death in 1821

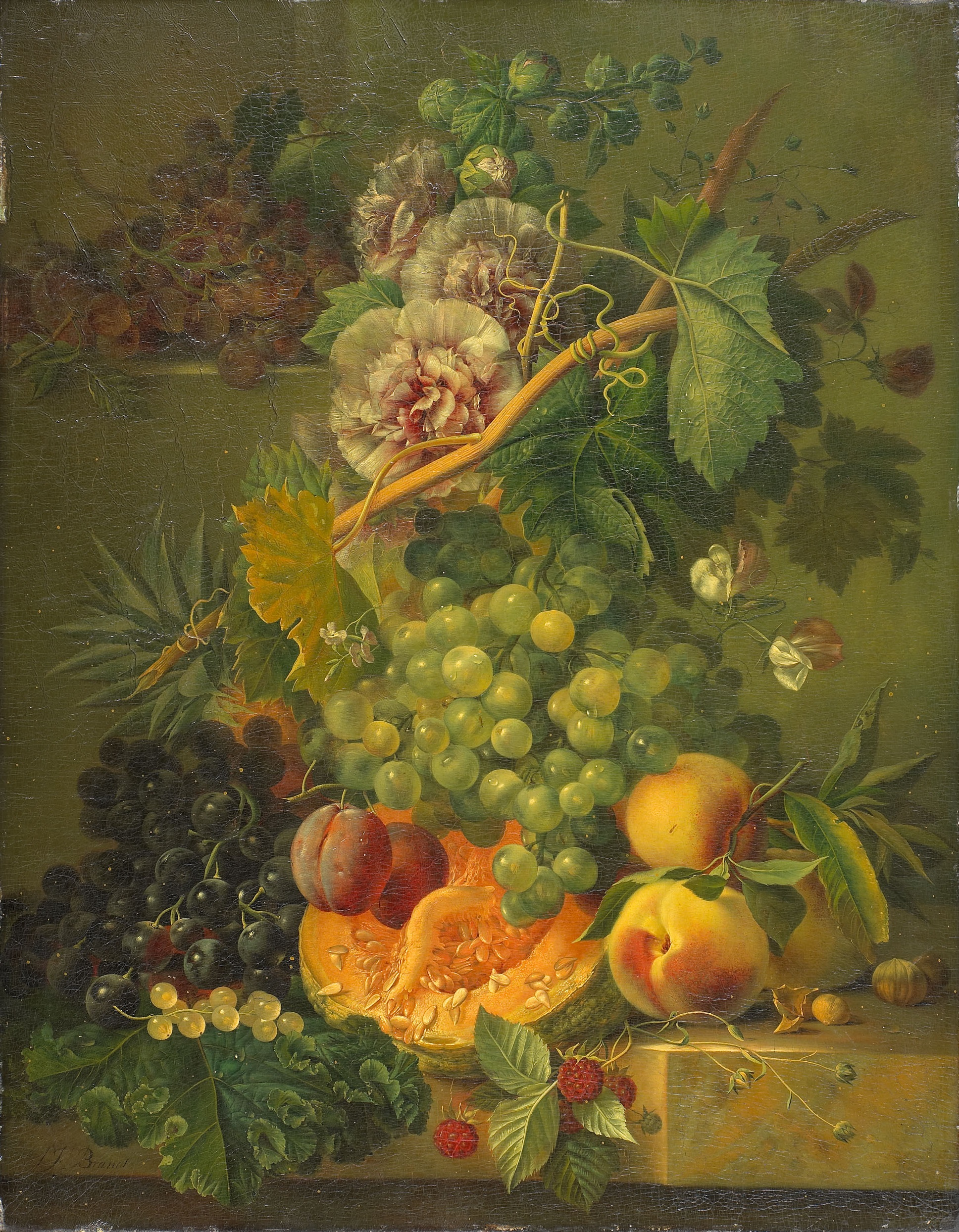
Still Life with Flowers and Fruits, 1816-7 (Rijksmuseum Amsterdam)

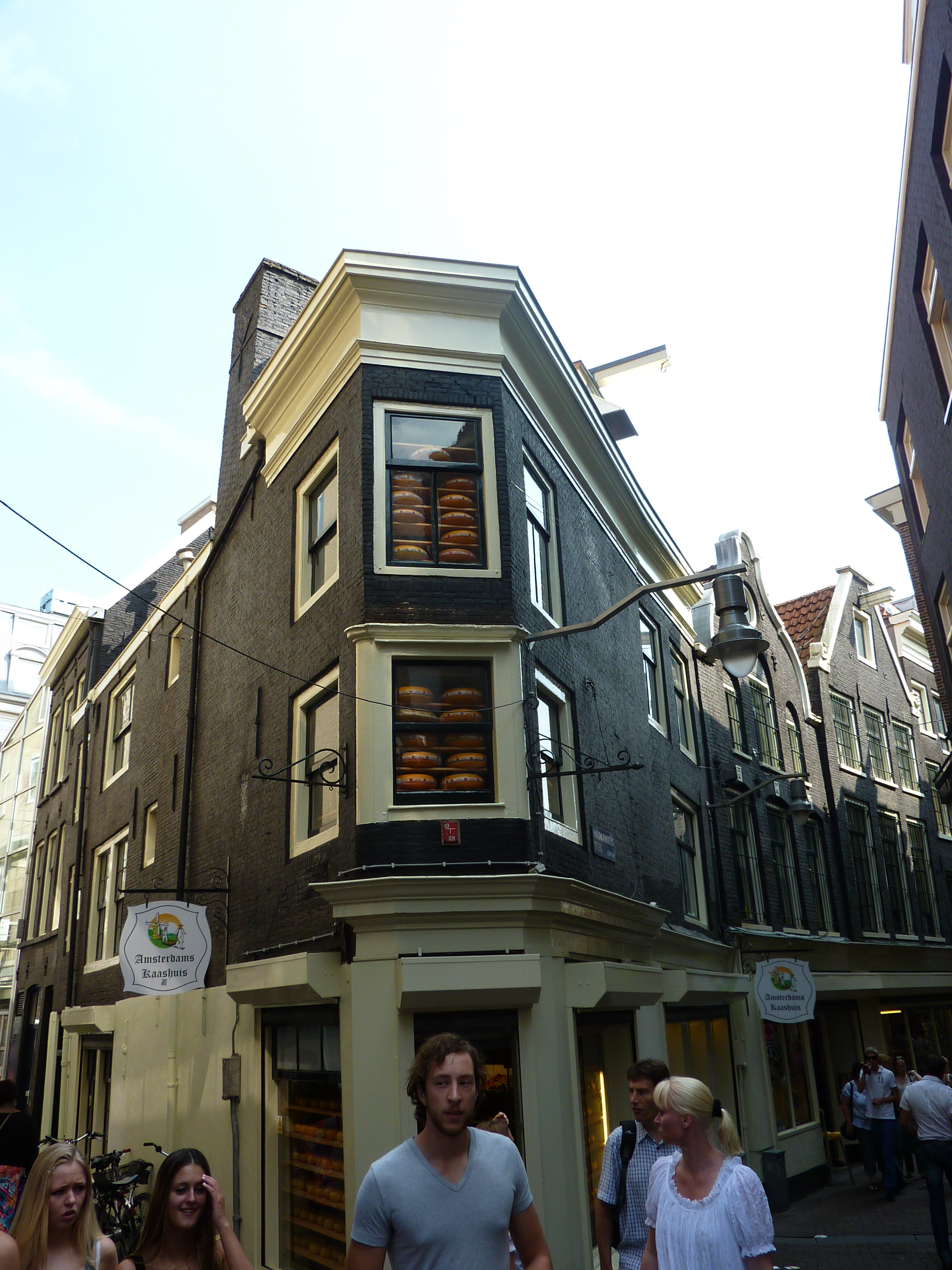
Haringpakkerssteeg. On the right side, at the end of the row, the house where the Brandts had their shop.

== Sources ==
- Geschiedenis der Vaderlandsche Schilderkunst
- Albertus Jonas Brandt at the RKD

Attribution:
