= St Mary's Church, Edstaston =

Coordinates: 52.8832°N 2.7181°W

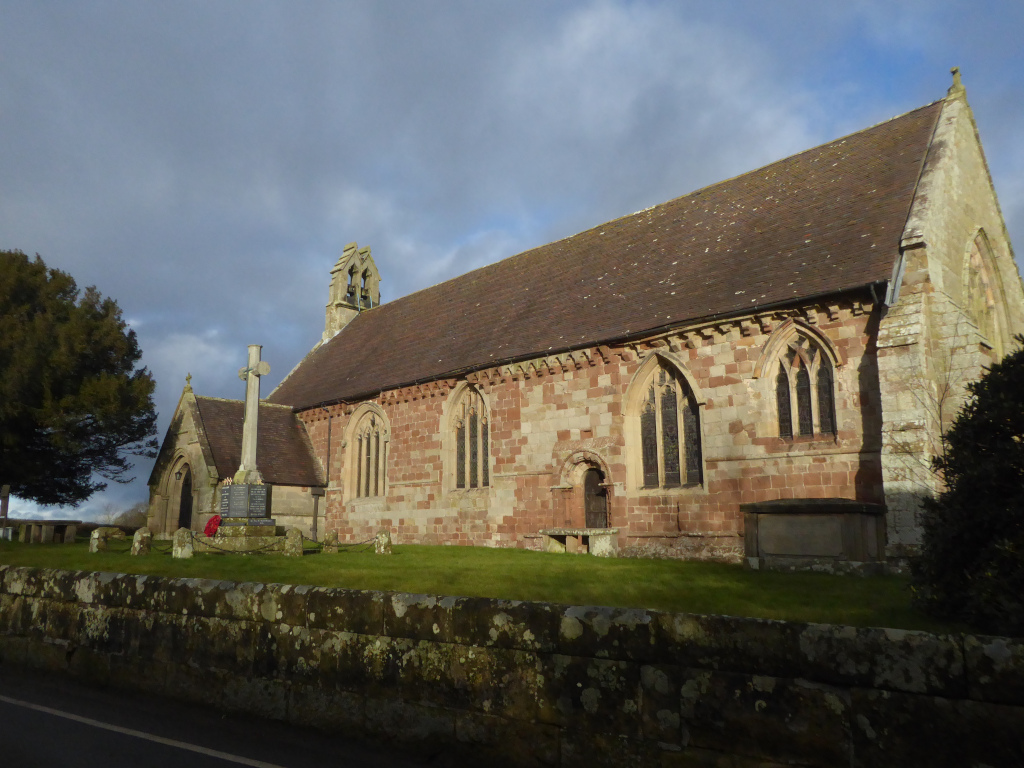
- St Mary's Church, Edstaston in 2024

- Location in Shropshire
- OS grid reference: SJ 518 320
- Location: Edstaston, Shropshire
- Country: England
- Denomination: Anglican
- Website: St Mary, Edstaston

History
- Status: Parish church

Architecture
- Functional status: Active
- Heritage designation: Grade I
- Designated: 28 October 1960
- Architect: G. H. Birch (restoration)
- Architectural type: Church
- Style: Norman, Gothic

Specifications
- Materials: Sandstone, tiled roof

Administration
- Province: Canterbury
- Diocese: Lichfield
- Archdeaconry: Salop
- Deanery: Wem and Whitchurch
- Parish: Edstaston

Clergy
- Vicar: Revd Daphne Hollings

St Mary's Church is in the village of Edstaston, in the civil parish of Wem Rural, Shropshire, England. It is an active Anglican parish church in the deanery of Wem and Whitchurch, the archdeaconry of Salop, and the diocese of Lichfield. Its benefice is united with those of St Chad, Prees, Holy Emmanuel, Fauls, Christ Church, Tilstock, and St Mary, Whixall. The church is recorded in the National Heritage List for England as a designated Grade I listed building. It is described as "one of the most complete Romanesque buildings in Shropshire".

== History ==
St Mary's originated in the late 12th century as a chapel of ease, and later became a parish church. The east wall was largely rebuilt in about 1300. The south porch dates from 1710. The west end was shortened and rebuilt in about 1723. Roof timbers in the nave are dated 1723. The church was restored by G. H. Birch in 1882–83. The bellcote and vestry date from the 19th century.

== Architecture ==
=== Exterior ===
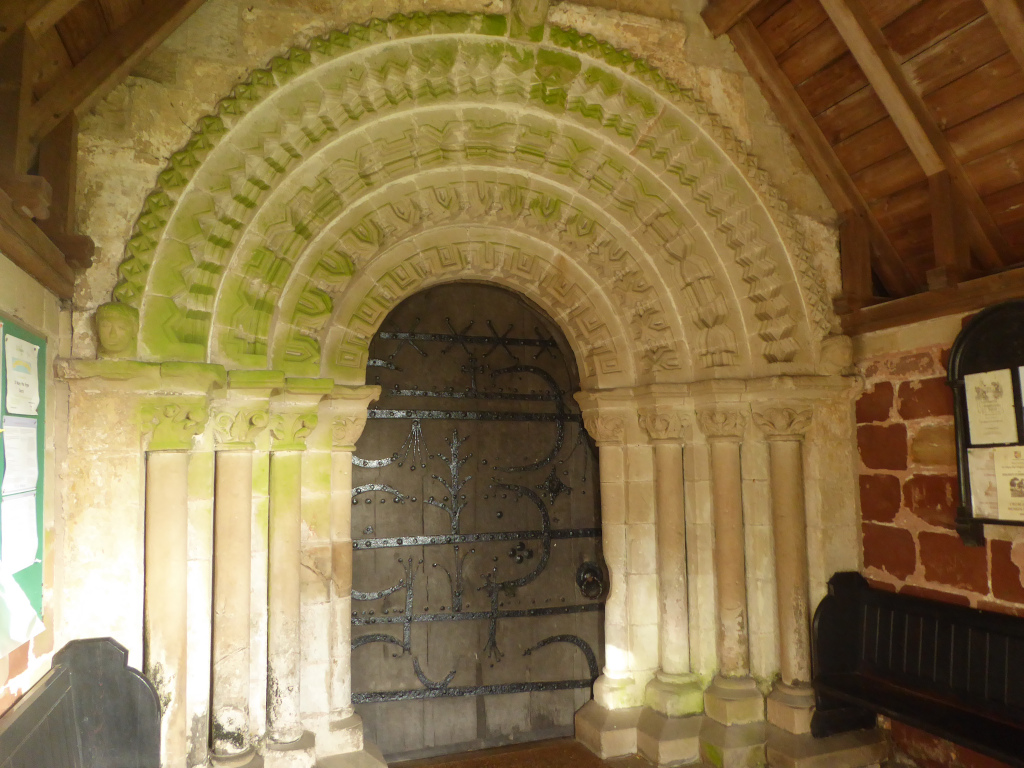
The Norman doorway

The church is constructed in red and yellow sandstone with a tiled roof. The plan consists of a nave and chancel in one cell, a south porch, a northeast vestry, and a bellcote on the west gable. The church has retained many Norman features, including three doorways. The south doorway is the most elaborate, with four orders of shafts and leaf capitals. It is decorated with chevrons and crenellation. The north doorway is simpler, with a single shaft. Its decoration includes crocus blossom, leaf scroll and geometrical motifs. Both of the doors in these doorways date from the late 12th century, and they have retained their original ironwork. The priest's doorway in the chancel has one order of shafts, with dog-tooth decoration and geometrical motifs. In the north wall of the church are two Norman windows.

Around the church, at the level of the eaves, is a Norman corbel table with trefoil arches. Also around the church, at the level of the sills, is an intermittent string course. Features from later periods include the five-light east window, a three-light window on the south of the chancel and, around the church, large three-light Perpendicular windows that cut through the Norman features.

=== Interior ===
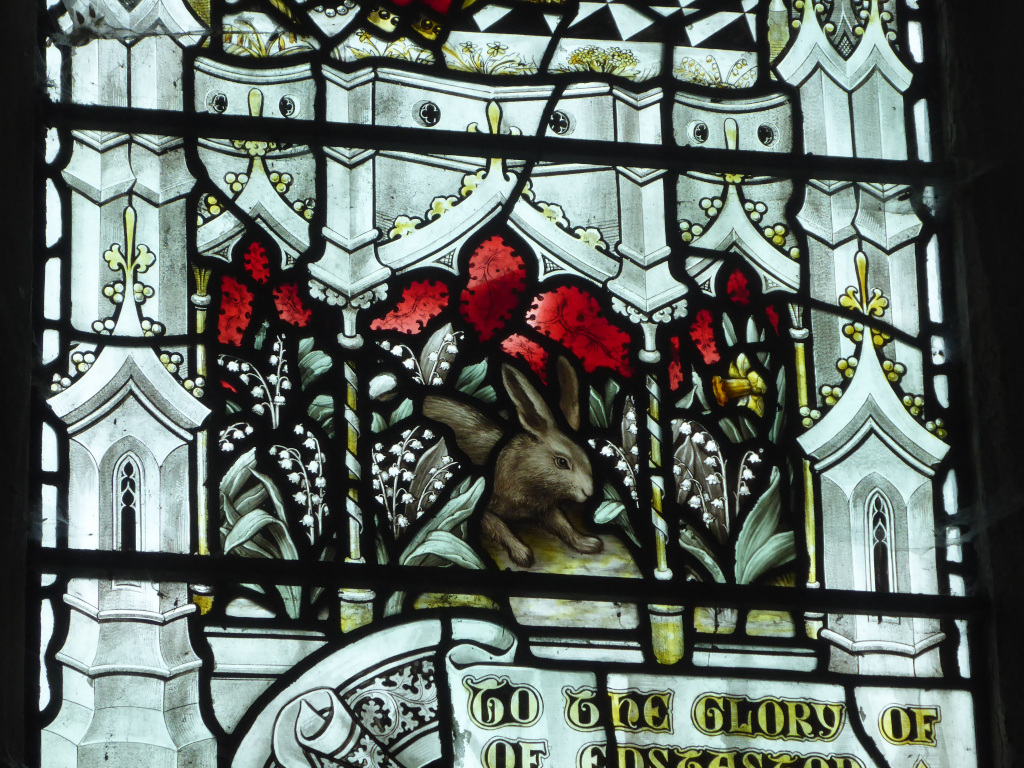
Hare design in the stained glass

In the north wall of the nave is a large Norman recess. In the east wall of the chancel is a 14th-century aumbry and piscina. The tub font dates from the 12th century. The pulpit is simple, and in Jacobean style. Otherwise the fittings and furniture are from the 19th century. Above the west window is the coat of arms of George III dated 1806. On the walls of the nave and chancel are traces of medieval and post-medieval paintings. One of the windows in the south wall of the nave contains fragments of 15th-century stained glass; the rest of the glass dates from the 19th century. There is a plaque to Lieutenant Franklin Knight Kirby, 93rd Highlanders, who died of typhus during the Crimean War, and another in stone to Major Frederick Raymond Clegg-Hill, killed in World War II. The two-manual pipe organ was built by J J. Binns, and was restored in 1975.

The porch on the south side records the name of Thomas Hill of Soulton as churchwarden.

== External features ==
In the churchyard are two memorials, both listed at Grade II. The Payne Memorial is to the south of the church. It is a sandstone table tomb dating from about 1750. Its plain top is supported by six fluted columns standing on a rectangular base. It has a brass plate inscribed with skull-and-cross bones, a sickle and a pick. The Mullner Memorial, to the north of the church, is a sandstone pedestal tomb dating from about 1817. It has a moulded plinth with plain pilasters, and a stepped top carrying a fluted urn-shape finial. The parish war memorial, an elegant stone cross with slate plaques listing 13 men who died in the World Wars and bearing a verse from Francis Pott's hymn, The strife is o'er the battle done, is in the churchyard.

== See also ==
- Grade I listed churches in Shropshire
- Listed buildings in Wem Rural
