= Listed buildings in Wem Urban =

Wem Urban is a civil parish in Shropshire, England. It contains 89 listed buildings that are recorded in the National Heritage List for England. Of these, three are listed at Grade II*, the middle of the three grades, and the others are at Grade II, the lowest grade. Wem is a market town, and most of the listed buildings are houses, cottages, shops, and public houses, the earliest of which are timber framed. The other listed buildings include a church and associated structures, a chapel, a former market hall, a former corn mill, a bridge, a former library, and a war memorial. For the listed buildings in the rural area surrounding the town, see Listed buildings in Wem Rural.

== Key ==
Grade	Criteria
II*	Particularly important buildings of more than special interest
II	Buildings of national importance and special interest

== Buildings ==
Name and location	Photograph	Date	Notes	Grade
Church of St Peter and St Paul; 52.85504°N 2.72572°W		14th century	The oldest part of the church is the base of the tower, the upper parts being Perpendicular. The nave was rebuilt in 1809–13, and the chancel was added in 1886. The church is built in stone with a slate roof, and consists of a nave, a short chancel with canted angles, a west tower, and a vestry in the angle of the chancel and the nave. The tower has diagonal buttresses with set offs, a west doorway with a moulded surround, statues in niches, and an embattled parapet with crocketed pinnacles. Inside, there are galleries on three sides.	II*
Old Hall; 52.85652°N 2.72261°W	—	Early 17th century	The house was later extended. The original part is timber framed with plastered infill and a tile roof. There are two storeys and an attic, and three bays. In the central bay is a three-storey gabled porch with an arched doorway, and a carved frieze above. At the rear is a roughcast timber framed wing, and to the south is a two-storey two-bay brick wing with sash windows.	II
Old Mill House; 52.85120°N 2.72629°W	—	Early 17th century	A timber framed house with plastered infill and a Welsh slate roof. There are two storeys and an attic, a main range, and a gabled cross-wing on the right. The windows are casements, and there is a round-headed window in the gable.	II
40 Aston Street; 52.85639°N 2.72118°W		17th century	A cottage, later a shop, it is timber framed, encased in brick in the 19th century, and has a tile roof. There are two storeys and two bays. In the ground floor is a shop window and a door, and the upper floor contains sash windows.	II
6 and 8 Chapel Street; 52.85515°N 2.72444°W	—	17th century	A pair of timber framed houses. No. 8 has been encased in brick and painted, and in No. 6 the timber framing is exposed, with painted brick infill. The roof is tiled, and there are two storeys and three bays. The doorways have pilasters and entablatures, there is one casement window, and the other windows are sashes.	II
19 and 21 Chapel Street; 52.85460°N 2.72403°W	—	17th century	A pair of timber framed houses with plastered brick infill and a tile roof with gabled ends. There are two storeys and three bays, and the windows are casements.	II
23 Chapel Street; 52.85451°N 2.72401°W	—	17th century or earlier	A stuccoed timber framed cottage, it has a Welsh slate roof. There are two storeys and two bays. The doorway has a moulded surround and a cornice hood, and the windows are casements. There is exposed timber framing on the north wall.	II
4 High Street; 52.85599°N 2.72304°W	—	17th century	A timber framed house, later a shop, refronted in brick and painted in the 19th century, and with a tile roof. The timber framing with brick infill is exposed in the gable end. In the ground floor is a shop front, and the upper floor contains two casement windows.	II
68 High Street; 52.85542°N 2.72680°W	—	17th century	A timber framed cottage with plastered infill and a tile roof with gable ends. There is one storey and an attic, a doorway with a hood, sash windows and a gabled dormer. One of the ground floor windows and the window in the dormer are horizontally-sliding.	II
71 and 71A High Street; 52.85522°N 2.72685°W		17th century	A timber framed shop with a stuccoed front painted to resemble timber framing. There is a tile roof with gabled ends and coved eaves, three storeys and two bays. To the right of the doorway is a bow window with pilasters and an entablature and to the left is a double-fronted shop window with pilasters. The upper floors contain casement windows.	II
83 and 85 High Street; 52.85493°N 2.72736°W		17th century	A pair of timber framed houses, partly encased in brick and partly roughcast, with a dentilled eaves cornice, and a tile roof. There are three storeys and two bays. The doorway on the front has moulded pilasters and an entablature, and the windows are casements.	II
93 High Street; 52.85488°N 2.72821°W		17th century	A timber framed house with plaster infill on a plinth of brick and stone, and with a roof of Welsh slate. There is one storey and an attic, and three bays, two bays gabled. On the front is a gabled porch, and the windows are casements.	II
8 and 10 Market Street; 52.85577°N 2.72638°W	—	17th century	A pair of houses with a timber framed core, stuccoed and roughcast, with a tile roof. There are two storeys and attics, and two gabled bays. The doorways have pilasters, and the windows are casements.	II
4 Noble Street; 52.85585°N 2.72427°W		17th century	A timber framed house, partly stuccoed, partly encased in brick, and with a tile roof. There is one storey and an attic, three bays, the middle bay with a large gable, and a double-pile plan, with two gables at the ends. The central doorway has a moulded surround and a pedimented hood on shaped brackets, and the windows are casements with hood moulds.	II
40 and 42 Noble Street; 52.85612°N 2.72707°W		17th century	A pair of timber framed houses that were refronted in brick and the eaves raised in the early 19th century. They have dentilled eaves and a slate roof, and the timber framing is exposed at the gable ends. There are two storeys and four bays. The doorways have gabled hoods on shaped brackets, and the windows are casements, those in the ground floor with segmental heads.	II
46 and 48 Noble Street; 52.85599°N 2.72760°W		17th century	A pair of timber framed houses, fronted in brick and the eaves raised in the 19th century. The brick is painted and there are dentilled eaves and a tile roof. The timber framing is exposed on the right gable end. There are two storeys and two bays. The doorways and windows, which are casements, have segmental heads.	II
2 and 3 The Cottage, Soulton Road; 52.85781°N 2.71134°W	—	17th century	A pair of timber framed cottages, partly faced in brick with dentilled eaves, partly stuccoed, and with timber framing exposed at the rear. They have a tile roof with a coped gable end and moulded kneelers. There is one storey and an attic, and three bays. The doors have gabled hoods, and the windows are casements with segmental heads.	II
The Castle Hotel; 52.85583°N 2.72362°W		17th century	The public house is timber framed, the middle floor is roughcast and the rest is stuccoed. It has rusticated quoins, string courses, and a Welsh slate roof. There are three storeys and three wide bays. In the centre is a portico with Doric columns and an entablature surmounted by a model of a castle. The doorway has fluted pilasters, panelled reveals, and a blind rectangular fanlight. The windows are sashes with keystones, those in the ground floor also with rusticated jambs.	II
44 Noble Street; 52.85608°N 2.72725°W	—	Late 17th or early 18th century	A timber framed house that was refronted in red brick in the 20th century. It has a modillion eaves cornice and a hipped tile roof. There are two storeys and two bays, a central doorway, and the windows are sashes.	II
Church Hall; 52.85517°N 2.72626°W		1702	Originally the market hall, it was probably reconstructed in the early 19th century. It is in red brick on a plinth, with stone dressings, rusticated quoins, a string course, oversailing eaves, and a hipped slate roof. There are two storeys and four bays. In the ground floor is an arcade of four rusticated elliptical arches on Tuscan columns, originally open and later filled in, and in the upper floor are sash windows with moulded architraves.	II
3 Crown Street; 52.85567°N 2.72518°W	—	Early 18th century	A painted brick house on a stone plinth, with stone dressings, rusticated quoins, a band, and a tile roof. There are two storeys and three bays. The central doorway has a moulded architrave, and the windows are casements with keyblocks, the window above the doorway having a cambered head.	II
73 High Street; 52.85518°N 2.72697°W	—	Early 18th century	A house in painted brick, partly stuccoed, with quoins, a string course, a dentilled eaves cornice, and a Welsh slate roof with coped gable ends, and shaped kneelers. There are two storeys and an attic, and three bays. The windows are sashes, and there are three gabled dormers.	II
Hazlitt House; 52.85590°N 2.72528°W		Early 18th century	A painted brick house with pilaster quoins, a string course, and a tile roof with gable ends. There are two storeys and four bays, the third bay taller and with a hipped roof, and a gabled rear wing. The doorway has a moulded surround and hood on brackets, and the windows are casements, some with segmental heads. On the front is an inscribed plaque stating that this had been the home of William Hazlitt and his father, a minister also named William Hazlitt.	II*
Wem Conservative Club; 52.85609°N 2.72609°W		Early to mid 18th century	A house, later a club, in Georgian style. It is in red brick with stone dressings, rusticated quoins, a moulded eaves cornice, and a hipped tile roof. There are two storeys and five bays, with a pediment over the middle bay. The central doorway has a moulded architrave with a pulvinated frieze, a keyblock, and a moulded cornice. The windows are sashes with segmental lintels and keyblocks.	II
26 Noble Street; 52.85604°N 2.72591°W	—	18th century	A roughcast brick cottage with its gable end to the road, and a tile roof with a coped gable end. There are two storeys. In the ground floor is a 19th-century shop front with moulded pilasters, a rectangular fanlight and an entablature. To the right is a two-storey one-bay extension with a pedimented doorway. The windows are sashes.	II
34 Noble Street; 52.85611°N 2.72671°W	—	18th century	A red brick house with a string course, a moulded stone eaves cornice, and a Welsh slate roof, and it is flanked by giant pilasters. There are two storeys and three bays. The central doorway has a panelled architrave and a hood on brackets, and the windows are sashes.	II
Former brewery offices 52.85611°N 2.72461°W	—	18th century	A house later used for other purposes, it is in brick with a dentilled eaves cornice, and a tile roof with coped gable ends. There are two storeys and five bays. On the front are two doorways, each with pilasters, panelled reveals, a rectangular fanlight and an entablature. The windows are sashes with moulded surrounds, and slightly arched openings.	II
Gate piers, Wem Conservative Club; 52.85603°N 2.72610°W	—	18th century	The gate piers at the entrance to the forecourt are in stone. On the front are fielded panels, and they have moulded caps and bases.	II
Former White Horse Hotel; 52.85541°N 2.72538°W		18th century	The former inn incorporates earlier timber framed material including crucks. It was enlarged in 1887, and has subsequently closed as a public house. The building is in rendered brick and has a slate roof. The main block has three storeys, three bays, and there is a long two-storey rear wing. In the centre is a porch with Tuscan columns and an entablature, and the doorway has a moulded surround. The windows are sashes, and in the left bay of the middle floor is a bay window. The rear wing has a mix of windows, and some exposed timber framing.	II
Congregational Chapel; 52.85491°N 2.72437°W	—	1775	Originally a Congregational Church and later used by the Baptists, it was enlarged and refronted in 1834. The chapel is in red brick with a front in sandstone. The front has two storeys and three bays and a gable containing a lunette. In the centre is an elliptical-arched doorway with a fanlight, detached Tuscan columns, and a broken pediment. The windows are round-headed with imposts and keystones. To the left is a one-bay extension with a pedimented doorway.	II
26 Chapel Street; 52.85425°N 2.72415°W	—	Late 18th century	A red brick house with a dentilled eaves cornice and a Welsh slate roof with coped gable ends and moulded kneelers. There are two storeys and three bays. The central doorway has panelled pilasters, a semicircular fanlight, and a broken pediment with console brackets. The windows are casements with plain lintels. The window above the doorway is blind.	II
28 Chapel Street; 52.85415°N 2.72415°W	—	Late 18th century	A red brick house with dentilled eaves, and a tile roof with coped gable ends and moulded kneelers. There are two storeys and two bays. The central doorway has fluted pilasters, a semicircular fanlight, and a pediment, and the windows are sashes.	II
34 and 36 High Street; 52.85548°N 2.72472°W		Late 18th century	A house, later used for other purposes, in painted brick, with rusticated quoins on the right, dentilled eaves, and a tile roof. There are three storeys and three bays. In the ground floor is a doorway with moulded pilasters and a cornice, and on the left is a round-headed passageway. Between the passageway and the doorway is a plate glass window, and the other windows are sashes, those in the lower two floors with rusticated lintels and keyblocks.	II
67 High Street and railings 52.85519°N 2.72648°W		Late 18th century	The house is stuccoed and has a front in ashlar stone and a rear timber framed wing. There is a moulded eaves cornice, a hipped Welsh slate roof, three storeys and three bays. The central doorway has pilasters, a semicircular fanlight with radial glazing bars, and a broken pediment, and the windows are sashes. Four steps lead up to the doorway which are flanked by railings that also enclose the forecourt area.	II
91 High Street and railings 52.85488°N 2.72798°W		Late 18th century	A red brick house with a coped parapet, and a slate roof with coped gable ends. There are three storeys and three bays. The outer bays contain three-storey bow windows with convex sash windows, the upper two floors with rusticated lintels, and the ground floor with tripartite windows and decorated lintels. The central doorway has pilasters, a semicircular fanlight, and a trellis-like porch with a tented roof. Enclosing the forecourt area are cast iron railings on a dwarf stone wall.	II
20 Noble Street; 52.85603°N 2.72535°W	—	Late 18th century	A brick house with dentilled eaves, and a Welsh slate roof with gabled ends. There are three storeys and three bays. The central doorway has moulded pilasters, a rectangular fanlight, a fluted frieze, and a moulded cornice. The windows are sashes with plain lintels and cills.	II
60 Noble Street; 52.85566°N 2.72856°W	—	Late 18th century	A red brick house with a moulded eaves cornice, and a tile roof with coped gables and shaped kneelers. There are three storeys and three bays. The central doorway has a moulded surround and a pedimented hood on shaped brackets, and the windows are replacements.	II
Adams House; 52.85521°N 2.72934°W	—	Late 18th century	A red brick house with a moulded eaves cornice and a hipped Welsh slate roof. There are three storeys and a square plan with three bays. The central doorway has panelled pilasters and pediment with moulded console brackets. The windows are sashes, those in the ground floor with round heads and keystones. In the right return are two canted bay windows.	II
Astbury House; 52.85491°N 2.72770°W	—	Late 18th century	A brick house with dentilled eaves, and a slate roof with pedimented gable ends. There are three storeys and three bays. In the ground floor are two doorways, one with a hood on brackets, and two multi-pane shop windows in moulded surrounds. The upper floors contain sash windows with moulded surrounds and stuccoed lintels, the middle window in each floor being blind.	II
Northwest entrance, Church of St Peter and St Paul; 52.85520°N 2.72609°W	—	Late 18th century	At the entrance to the churchyard is a pair of gate piers in rusticated stone, each with a moulded cap and a draped urn. Between them are ornate wrought iron gates and an overthrow.	II
Park House; 52.85682°N 2.72221°W		Late 18th century	A red brick house with stone dressings on a stone plinth, with bands, a cornice, a coped parapet, and a roof of tile and slate. There are three storeys and a basement, and a front of five bays, the middle bay projecting slightly under a pediment containing a coat of arms. In the centre is a porch with Ionic columns, and a fluted frieze, and the doorway has a fanlight. The windows are sashes, those in the ground floor with round heads, and the window above the doorway has an architrave. At the rear is a full-height three-bay bow window.	II*
The Hollies; 52.85613°N 2.72554°W	—	Late 18th century	A roughcast brick house with a sill band, a parapet with moulded stone coping and a tile roof. There are three storeys and three bays. The central doorway has panelled pilasters, a semicircular traceried fanlight, a fluted frieze, and moulded console brackets. The windows are sashes with plain stone lintels.	II
37 High Street; 52.85532°N 2.72466°W	—	c. 1800	A shop in stuccoed brick with rusticated quoins and a tile roof. There are three storeys and two bays. In the ground floor is a small shop front with pilasters and a cornice, and a doorway to the left, and the upper floors contain sash windows with rusticated heads.	II
62 High Street; 52.85533°N 2.72630°W		c. 1800	A red brick shop on a corner site with a moulded stone eaves cornice, and a tile roof with coped gable ends. There are three storeys, seven bays and a rear wing. In the ground floor is a Victorian shop front, and the upper floors contain sash windows with plain lintels. In the rear wing is a rusticated elliptical-arched carriageway.	II
64 High Street; 52.85534°N 2.72658°W	—	c. 1800	A red brick shop on a corner site, with a blocking course, a moulded stone cornice, and a tile roof. There are three storeys and an attic, two bays, and a canted bay on the corner. In the ground floor is a Victorian shop front, and in the corner is a doorway with pilasters and a hood on console brackets. Most of the windows are sashes with plain stone lintels, some are replacements, and there is a roof dormer.	II
31 Noble Street; 52.85597°N 2.72652°W	—	c. 1800	A red brick house with dentilled eaves, and a Welsh slate roof with gabled ends. There are three storeys and three bays. The doorway has thin moulded pilasters, a semicircular fanlight, and a pediment with a dentilled cornice on console brackets. The windows are sashes with plain lintels and cills.	II
30 Noble Street; 52.85612°N 2.72634°W	—	Late 18th or early 19th century	A brick house with a rendered front, a modillion eaves cornice, and a Welsh slate roof with gabled ends. There are two storeys and three bays. The central doorway has a plain architrave and a pedimented hood on small brackets, and the windows are sashes.	II
41 Noble Street; 52.85594°N 2.72706°W	—	Late 18th or early 19th century	A stuccoed brick house on a stone plinth with a tile roof. There are two storeys and two bays. The doorway has pilasters and an entablature, and the windows are sashes with plain stone lintels.	II
Wem Mill; 52.85261°N 2.72624°W		1819	A former corn that was extended later in the 19th century, built in red brick. The original block has three storeys, fronts of three bays, a sandstone plinth, sash windows with stone lintels, and a hipped slate roof. The middle bay of the front facing the road is gabled and contains loading bays and a hoist above. The extension to the south has a tile roof, four storeys, four bays facing the road, the outer bays with loading bays and hoists, and windows with segmental heads. On the east side is a tall square chimney.	II
The Old Rectory; 52.85707°N 2.73328°W	—	c. 1820	The former rectory, later used for other purposes, is in red brick with a stone eaves cornice, and a hipped Welsh slate roof. There are two storeys and three bays, and later wings to the north. At the centre of the east front is a stone portico with two pairs of Tuscan columns carrying an entablature and a pediment. The south front has a two-storey bow window, and the other windows are sashes.	II
3 and 5 Chapel Street; 52.85531°N 2.72430°W	—	Early 19th century	A pair of red brick houses with dentilled and stuccoed eaves, and a tile roof with gabled ends. There are three storeys and three bays. The paired doorways have moulded surrounds, rectangular fanlights, cornice hoods, and console brackets. The windows are sashes with plain lintels, those in the middle bay are blind.	II
14 and 16 Chapel Street; 52.85464°N 2.72426°W	—	Early 19th century	A red brick house at right angles to the street, it has dentilled eaves and a hipped tile roof. There are three storeys, and one bay facing the street. On this front is a round-arched doorway with a moulded surround, a fanlight, and a keyblock. On the north front is a two-storey canted bay window, and the other windows are sashes.	II
17 Chapel Street; 52.85470°N 2.72400°W		Early 19th century	A red brick house with a sill band, dentilled eaves, and a tile roof. There are three storeys and three bays. In the centre is a doorway with pilasters, a rectangular fanlight, and an entablature. The windows are sashes with plain stone lintels.	II
24 Chapel Street; 52.85431°N 2.72416°W	—	Early 19th century	A red brick cottage on a stone plinth, with moulded eaves and a hipped slate roof. There are two storeys and two bays. The central doorway has pilasters, a blind semicircular fanlight, and a cornice on console brackets. The windows have three lights, those in the ground floor with plain lintels.	II
32 and 34 Chapel Street; 52.85392°N 2.72402°W	—	Early 19th century	A pair of roughcast brick houses that have a tile roof with coped gable ends and moulded kneelers. There are two storeys and three bays. In the outer bays are two-storey semicircular bay windows with Tuscan columns and pilasters carrying entablatures and containing curved sash windows. In the centre is a doorway with panelled pilasters, a semicircular traceried fanlight, a fluted frieze with medallions, a moulded cornice, and enriched console brackets.	II
2 High Street and 1 New Street; 52.85605°N 2.72291°W		Early 19th century	A pair of red brick shops on a corner site with a rounded corner. They have a dentilled eaves course and a slate roof with gabled ends. There are three storeys, two bays on High Street and four on New Street. In the ground floor is an early 19th-century shop front with pilasters on High Street, and shop windows on New Street. The upper floors contain sash windows with plain stone lintels.	II
19 and 21 High Street; 52.85560°N 2.72387°W		Early 19th century	A red brick shop with a stuccoed eaves band and a slate roof with gable ends. There are three storeys and three bays. In the ground floor are a central doorway and two late 19th-century shop windows, all with bracketed hoods. The windows are sashes with plain lintels.	II
27 High Street; 52.85550°N 2.72417°W		Early 19th century	A stuccoed building with quoin pilasters, and a Welsh slate roof with gable ends. There are three storeys and three bays. The ground floor contains a large Victorian shop front. In the middle bay of the upper floors is a round-headed two-storey blind panel, and the outer bays contain sash windows.	II
40 and 42 High Street; 52.85542°N 2.72512°W		Early 19th century	A pair of red brick shops with a dentilled eaves course and a hipped slate roof. There are three storeys and two bays. In the ground floor are two shop fronts, and the upper floors contain sash windows with plain stone lintels and cills.	II
44 and 46 High Street; 52.85542°N 2.72522°W		Early 19th century	A pair of shops in painted brick with a tile roof. There are three storeys and four bays. In the ground floor are modern shop fronts, and the upper floors contain sash windows with plain lintels.	II
47 and 49 High Street; 52.85526°N 2.72526°W		Early 19th century	A pair of shops on a corner site in stuccoed brick on a timber framed core, with giant pilasters between the bays, a blocking course and a moulded cornice, raised on the corner, and a hipped tile roof. There are two storeys, four bays on High Street, one bay on Mill Street, and a canted bay on the corner. In the ground floor are two shop fronts and a doorway with moulded pilasters, a semicircular fanlight and a broken pediment, and the windows are sashes.	II
50 and 52 High Street; 52.85537°N 2.72559°W		Early 19th century	A pair of red brick shops with a string course and a Welsh slate roof. There are three storeys and four bays. In the ground floor are modern shop fronts, and the upper floors contain sash windows with plain lintels.	II
56 and 58 High Street; 52.85536°N 2.72589°W		Early 19th century	A pair of red brick shops with brackets to the eaves soffits, and a Welsh slate roof with gable ends. There are three storeys and four bays. In the ground floor are two Victorian shop fronts and an elliptical-arched carriageway to the left, and the upper floors contain sash windows with plain lintels.	II
70 High Street; 52.85534°N 2.72683°W		Early 19th century	A red brick house on an earlier timber framed core, with exposed timber framing on the end wall, and a tile roof. There are two storeys and three bays. The central doorway has moulded pilasters, a semicircular fanlight with radial tracery, and a broken pediment, and the windows are sashes with plain lintels.	II
72, 74 and 76 High Street; 52.85531°N 2.72705°W	—	Early 19th century	A row of stuccoed houses that have a tile roof with gabled ends. There are three storeys and five bays, the left bay splayed forward. In the ground floor are doorways with pilasters and cornices on console brackets, and altered shop fronts. In the upper floors are windows, most of which are sashes.	II
78 High Street; 52.85524°N 2.72714°W	—	Early 19th century	A painted brick house with a moulded stone eaves cornice, and a tile roof with coped gables. There are three storeys and three bays. The windows are sashes with plain lintels.	II
3 New Street; 52.85618°N 2.72291°W	—	Early 19th century	A red brick house with dentilled eaves, and a Welsh slate roof with gabled ends. There are three storeys and two bays. The central doorway has moulded pilasters and a cornice, and a semicircular fanlight. The windows are sashes with plain lintels.	II
63 New Street; 52.85857°N 2.72341°W	—	Early 19th century	A red brick house with a cill band, a dentilled and stuccoed cornice, and a hipped Welsh slate roof. There are two storeys and three bays, and single-storey flanking wings. In the centre is a porch with fluted Ionic columns and a heavy entablature, and the doorway has panelled reveals, and a rectangular fanlight. The windows are sashes with plain lintels, and the flanking bays have ogee-shaped gables flanked by urns on pillars.	II
8–18 Noble Street; 52.85602°N 2.72507°W	—	Early 19th century	A terrace of six brick houses with dentilled eaves and a Welsh slate roof, hipped at the right over a curved corner. There are three storeys and eight bays. The doorways have moulded surrounds, panelled reveals, rectangular fanlights, and cornices on console brackets. Most of the original sash windows have been replaced by casements.	II
23 Noble Street; 52.85593°N 2.72592°W	—	Early 19th century	A red brick house with dentilled eaves and a slate roof. There are two storeys and two bays. The central doorway has fluted pilasters, a rectangular fanlight, and an entablature with a moulded cornice and a fluted frieze. The windows are sashes, in the ground floor with flat brick arches, and in the upper floor with lintels.	II
24 Noble Street; 52.85604°N 2.72571°W	—	Early 19th century	A red brick house with oversailing eaves and a tile roof. There are three storeys and two bays. In the left bay is a doorway with moulded pilasters, panelled reveals, a traceried fanlight, and a cornice on console brackets. The windows are sashes with plain stone lintels.	II
29 Noble Street; 52.85595°N 2.72622°W	—	Early 19th century	A painted brick house that has a tile roof with gabled ends. There are two storeys and an attic, and one bay. The doorway has fluted pilasters, and an entablature with a cornice hood. The windows are sashes, and there are two gabled dormers.	II
59 Noble Street; 52.85564°N 2.72821°W	—	Early 19th century	A red brick house with dentilled stuccoed eaves and a tile roof with gabled ends. There are three storeys and three bays. The central doorway has a moulded surround, panelled reveals, a rectangular fanlight, and a cornice on console brackets, and the windows are sashes with plain lintels.	II
61 and 63 Noble Street; 52.85548°N 2.72862°W	—	Early 19th century	A pair of red brick houses, No. 61 painted, with a cill band, dentilled stuccoed eaves, and a Welsh slate roof. There are two storeys, No. 61 has three bays and No. 63 has two. Each house has a doorway with a moulded surround, a rectangular fanlight, a cornice and console brackets. The windows are sashes with plain stone lintels.	II
Bridge over River Roden north of Wem Mill; 52.85297°N 2.72614°W		Early 19th century	The bridge carries the B5476 road over the River Roden. It is in stone and consists of a single segmental arch. The arch is rusticated, and the bridge has a string course, a parapet with plain coping, and a keystone. On the west side is attached a pedestrian bridge.	II
Hawkstone Arms Public House; 52.85986°N 2.72285°W		Early 19th century	The public house is in roughcast brick with a cill band, a stuccoed and dentilled eaves cornice, and a hipped Welsh slate roof. There are two storeys and three bays. The central doorway has pilasters, a rectangular fanlight, and an entablature. The windows are sashes with plain lintels.	II
Landona Farmhouse; 52.86326°N 2.72173°W	—	Early 19th century	The farmhouse is in stuccoed brick with a string course, oversailing eaves, and a hipped Welsh slate roof. There are two storeys, three bays, the middle bay slightly projecting, and flanking single-storey single-bay lean tos. In the centre is an Ionic portico and a doorway with a rectangular fanlight. The window above the doorway has a moulded architrave and a hood on console brackets, and the other windows are sashes with plain lintels and keyblocks.	II
National Westminster Bank; 52.85531°N 2.72483°W		Early 19th century	A house, later a bank, in red brick with a blocking course and moulded cornice, and a Welsh slate roof with coped gable ends. There are three storeys and six bays. In the ground floor is a doorway with a cambered arch, pilasters, a semicircular traceried fanlight, and a broken pediment on fluted brackets. This is flanked by multi-paned windows, and to the right is a simpler doorway. The upper floors contain sash windows, those above the main doorway with moulded architraves, and the door in the middle floor also has a fluted frieze and a cornice.	II
Roden House; 52.85356°N 2.72528°W	—	Early 19th century	A rendered stone house with quoin pilasters, a string course, modillion eaves, and a hipped Welsh slate roof. There are two storeys and three bays. In the centre is a porch with Ionic columns carrying an entablature with a pediment, and the doorway has a round arch. In the south front is an openwork iron porch with a tented roof, and the windows are sashes.	II
Roseville; 52.85652°N 2.72337°W	—	Early 19th century	A house later used for other purposes, it is in red brick with painted stone dressings, a cill band, a moulded eaves cornice, and a hipped slate roof. There are two storeys and three bays. In the centre is a porch with Tuscan columns carrying an entablature and a wrought iron balustrade. To the right is a splayed bay window, and the other windows are sashes with plain stone lintels. The middle window in the upper floor has a moulded architrave, and an entablature with a fluted frieze.	II
White Lion Public House; 52.85594°N 2.72272°W		Early 19th century	The public house is in painted brick on a plinth, and has a Welsh slate roof. There are two storeys and an attic, and three bays. In the ground floor is a central doorway with a fanlight and a segmental head, flanked by bow windows in splayed recesses, and above them is a cornice. The upper floor contains sash windows with plain lintels.	II
69 High Street; 52.85526°N 2.72670°W	—	Early to mid 19th century	A red brick shop with dentilled eaves and a Welsh slate roof with pedimented gable ends. There are two storeys and four bays. In the ground floor is a Victorian shop front with pilasters and a cornice, and to the right is an elliptical arched carriageway. The upper floor contains sash windows with plain lintels.	II
Beech House; 52.85636°N 2.73481°W		Early to mid 19th century	A red brick house with bracketed eaves and a hipped Welsh slate roof. There are two storeys and a front of three bays. In the centre is a porch with thin Tuscan columns carrying a heavy entablature and a wrought iron balcony. The doorway has a segmental fanlight, and the windows are sashes with plain lintels.	II
Creamore Grove; 52.86064°N 2.72215°W		Early to mid 19th century	A brick house with a cill band and stuccoed eaves, and a hipped Welsh slate roof. There are two storeys and three bays. The central porch has Tuscan columns and a heavy entablature, and there is a rectangular fanlight. The windows are sashes with plain stone lintels, and the middle window in the upper floor has a moulded architrave and a cornice on console brackets.	II
The Drayton Gate and stables 52.85663°N 2.71880°W		Early to mid 19th century	The public house is in red brick with a slate roof, hipped on the left. There are two storeys and four bays. The doorway has pilasters and a rectangular fanlight, and the windows are sashes with plain stone lintels. Adjoining on the right is a former stable range in painted sandstone with a slate roof, containing stable and cart doors and a hayloft door.	II
Wemsbrook Lodge; 52.86018°N 2.72277°W	—	Early to mid 19th century	A brick house with a cill band, stuccoed eaves, and a hipped Welsh slate roof. There are two storeys and three bays. In the centre is a porch with Tuscan columns and a heavy entablature, and a doorway with a rectangular fanlight. The window above the porch has a moulded architrave with a cornice on console brackets, and the other windows are sashes with plain stone lintels.	II
Gate piers, Church of St Peter and St Paul; 52.85450°N 2.72563°W		Mid 19th century	The gate piers at the southern end of the churchyard are in stone. Each pier has a moulded cap with an urn surmounted by a ball finial.	II
Morgan Library; 52.85605°N 2.72192°W		1905	The library, later used for other purposes, was designed by Frank Shayler in Arts and Crafts style. It is in red brick with stone dressings, and a tile roof with stone coped gables. There is one storey and a front of three bays, the outer bays asymmetrically gabled. In the left bay is a large canted bay window. The central doorway has a stone arch and above are reliefs of boys reading. Inside, there is an inglenook fireplace.	II
War memorial 52.85519°N 2.72560°W		Early 1920s	The war memorial is in the churchyard of the Church of St Peter and St Paul. It is in Portland stone, and in the form of a medieval preaching cross. It has an octagonal plan, and consists of a four-stepped base, an embattled pedestal, a smaller moulded pedestal, and a slender octagonal shaft with a Latin cross carved with a shield, a coronet, and foliage. There are two slate plaques inscribed with the names of those lost in both World Wars.	II
