= Listed buildings in Wem Rural =

Wem Rural is a civil parish in Shropshire, England. It contains 59 listed buildings that are recorded in the National Heritage List for England. Of these, one is listed at Grade I, the highest of the three grades, three are at Grade II*, the middle grade, and the others are at Grade II, the lowest grade. The parish consists of an area around the town of Wem, but not the town itself. It contains the villages of Aston, Coton, Quina Brook, and Tilley and smaller settlements, and is otherwise rural. Most of the listed buildings are houses and associated structures, cottages, farmhouses and farm buildings, a high proportion of which are timber framed or have a timber framed core. The other listed buildings include churches, items in a churchyard, a former manor house, a public house, four bridges, two lime kilns, and six mileposts. For the listed buildings within the town of Wem, see Listed buildings in Wem Urban.

== Key ==
Grade	Criteria
I	Buildings of exceptional interest, sometimes considered to be internationally important
II*	Particularly important buildings of more than special interest
II	Buildings of national importance and special interest

== Buildings ==
Name and location	Photograph	Date	Notes	Grade
St Mary's Church, Edstaston; 52.88307°N 2.71815°W		Late 12th century	The church has been altered and extended over the centuries. It is built in red and yellow sandstone and has a tile roof. The church consists of a nave and a chancel in one cell, a south porch, and a southeast vestry, and on the west gable is a bellcote. The Norman features that have been retained include three doorways. Later features include a five-light east window, and Perpendicular windows around the church.	I
Bridge Farmhouse, Aston; 52.85411°N 2.70055°W	—	14th or 15th century	The farmhouse was remodelled and extended in the 17th century, and a former cowhouse has been incorporated. It is timber framed with cruck construction, mostly rendered, on a sandstone plinth, with a tile roof, and an exposed true cruck truss in the right gable end. There is one storey and an attic, on the front is a gabled porch, the windows are casements, and there are two gabled dormers.	II
Lacon Hall; 52.86925°N 2.69175°W	—	15th century (probable)	A farmhouse that has been remodelled, altered and extended. It has a timber framed core encased and extended in rendered brick, and a tile roof. The farmhouse consists of a three-bay hall range, a gabled cross-wing on the left, and two later rear wings. There are two storeys, a dentilled eaves cornice, and a floor band in the cross-wing. The windows are casements, those in the ground floor with segmental heads, and there is a gabled porch and a doorway with a rectangular fanlight.	II
Soulton Hall with balustrade, walls and gate piers 52.86775°N 2.67923°W	East front of Soulton Hall	16th century	Thought to be the architectural project of Sir Rowland Hill in the mid-1500s. The house is in red brick with some diapering in blue brick, dressings in Grinshill sandstone, on a plinth, with quoins, moulded string courses, and a coped parapet with corner urn finials. There are three storeys and a basement, a square double-pile plan, the to entrance front to the north has two very wide bays, and the east and west elevations have two tower-like projections. A doorcase was added in 1668, it is slightly off-centre on the north side north and is includesfluted Roman Doric columns, a moulded architrave, a frieze with curiously differenced triglyphs, a moulded cornice, and a rainbow shaped pediment containing a shield. The windows are mullioned or mullioned and transomed. on the north front of the house is a balustrade and a flight of nine steps with decorative piers. The garden area in front of the balustrade is enclosed by red brick walls containing square gate piers with ball finials. The area to the eastern side of the house is the only symmetrical face and once had a gate, avenue and landscaping making it the senior elevation despite having no door. Prior to this there was a small 1100s castle-like structure now scheduled in the grounds which has been exchvated.	II*
Aston Hall; 52.85395°N 2.69648°W	—	Late 16th century	A farmhouse, later extended, it is timber framed with infill and extensions in painted brick, and a tile roof. There are two storeys and an attic, and an L-shaped plan with a hall range, a projecting cross-wing on the right, and lean-tos on the cross-wing. The upper storey and the attic of the cross-wing are jettied, with a moulded bressumer to the upper storey and the attic having carved brackets. There is a bay window in the cross-wing, and elsewhere the windows are a mix of casements, mullioned and mullioned and transomed windows, and there is a gabled dormer on the rear of the hall range.	II
Yew Tree Farmhouse, Coton; 52.90738°N 2.70592°W	—	Late 16th century	The former farmhouse is timber framed with infill partly rendered and partly in red brick, extensions in red brick, and a thatched roof. There is one storey and an attic, three bays, and a brick lean-to on the left. On the front is a gabled porch, and the windows are casements.	II
Aston House; 52.85309°N 2.70009°W	—	Late 16th or early 17th century	The house has a timber framed core and has been encased and rendered with applied timber framing. It has a rendered plinth and a slate roof. There are two storeys and an attic, and an H-shaped plan consisting of a hall range and cross-wings. In the centre is a two-storey porch with a hipped roof containing wooden benches, and a doorway with a moulded surround. The windows are mullioned and transomed, and there is a hip-roofed dormer.	II
Bridge Farmhouse, Pepperstreet; 52.88973°N 2.70251°W	—	16th or 17th century	The farmhouse was extended and altered in the 18th century. Originally timber framed, it has been encased and extended in red brick, and has a tile roof. The earliest part is a two-bay gabled cross-wing and a long hall range to the right, and in the 18th century a rear wing and an outshut in the angle were added. There are two storeys, and the hall range has an attic. On the front is a gabled porch with a dentilled eaves cornice and a doorway with a segmental-headed fanlight. Flanking this are canted bay windows, and other windows are casements.	II
Tilley Manor; 52.84648°N 2.73369°W	—	Late 16th or early 17th century	A farmhouse that was later altered, it is timber framed with painted brick infill on a painted sandstone plinth and has a tile roof. There are two storeys, and a U-shaped plan, with two two-bay cross-wings flanking a hall range that extends for one bay behind the right cross-wing. The gables of the cross-wings and the hall range are jettied with moulded bressumers. The windows are casements under bracketed hoods, and the doorway has a gabled hood. Inside the house is an inglenook fireplace.	II
White Lodge; 52.88252°N 2.71835°W	—	16th or 17th century	The house is in roughcast timber framing on a rendered plinth and has a thatched roof. There are two storeys and two bays. On the front is a gabled porch, and there is a casement window and a fixed window.	II
The Ditches Hall; 52.85930°N 2.74965°W		1612	A farmhouse, later a private house, it is timber framed with plaster infill, on a plinth of sandstone and brick, and has a tile roof. There are two storeys, an attic and a cellar, and a symmetrical front of three wide bays. The upper storey has a continuous jetty with a moulded bressumer, and the attic in the right gable end is also jettied. In the centre is a two-storey porch, and the windows are mullioned and transomed.	II*
Tilley Hall and walls 52.84627°N 2.73309°W		1613	A timber framed house with rendered wattle and daub infill and tile roofs. There is an H-shaped plan, consisting of a hall range with two storeys and cross-wings with two storeys and attics. The left cross-wing has a jettied upper storey and attic with decorated bressumers. There is a gabled porch with the date on the lintel, and the windows are casements. Attached to the front and the rear are walls, partly in sandstone and partly in red brick.	II*
Brook House; 52.84688°N 2.73364°W	—	Early 17th century	A farmhouse, later a private house, it was later extended. It is timber framed and roughcast, and has a tile roof. There are two storeys, four bays, and later single-storey lean-to on the right. On the front are two doorways, one with a gabled hood, and the windows are casements.	II
Home Farmhouse; 52.91074°N 2.69996°W	—	Early 17th century	The farmhouse, which was altered in the 18th century, is timber framed with infill and a plinth in painted brick, and a slate roof. There are two storeys, a two-bay front range, and a 19th-century gabled rear wing. The doorway has a gabled hood, and the windows are multi-paned casements.	II
Oak Cottage; 52.84616°N 2.73250°W	—	Early 17th century	A farmhouse, later a private house, it is timber framed with painted brick infill and a tile roof. There are two storeys and an attic, and three bays. The upper storey is jettied with a moulded bressumer on carved brackets, and the windows are casements.	II
Palms Hill Farmhouse; 52.84139°N 2.71049°W	—	Early 17th century	The farmhouse has been altered and extended. It is timber framed with painted brick infill on a plinth, and has a tile roof. There is one storey and an attic, two bays, and a later rear extension. The windows are casements and there are raking eaves dormers.	II
Tilley Lodge; 52.84507°N 2.73139°W	—	Early 17th century (probable)	The farmhouse has a timber framed core and is roughcast and painted to resemble timber framing. It has a rendered plinth, a tile roof, one storey and an attic, and three bays. On the front is a gabled porch, the windows are mullioned and transomed casements, and there are two gabled eaves dormers.	II
Trench Farmhouse; 52.83687°N 2.72166°W	—	Early 17th century	The farmhouse was considerably extended in the 19th century. The original part is timber framed with painted brick infill on a chamfered plinth of Grinshill sandstone, the extension is in brick painted to resemble timber framing, and the roof is tiled. The original part has four bays, the extension is to the left, and there is a lean-to. The doorway has a segmental head, the windows are casements, and there is a gabled roof dormer.	II
Wolverley Hall; 52.87593°N 2.78994°W	—	Early 17th century	A farmhouse that was altered later. The older part is timber framed with painted brick infill and a tile roof. The farmhouse has an H-shaped plan, consisting of a central hall range with two storeys, and two-bay gabled cross-wings with two storeys and attics. The upper storeys and attics are slightly jettied, and the left gable has a bressumer with decorative moulding. The front of the central range has been rebuilt in red brick with a stepped eaves cornice, and is rendered. The doorway has pilasters and a rectangular fanlight, and the windows are casements with bracketed hoods.	II
51 Coton; 52.91204°N 2.70107°W	—	17th century (probable)	The cottage is in roughcast timber framing and has a slate roof. There are two storeys, two bays, and a later lean-to on the left. The windows are casements.	II
Horton Villa; 52.86397°N 2.75778°W	—	17th century	The cottage, which was later altered and expanded, is timber framed with infill and rebuilding in painted brick, and it has a slate roof. There is one storey and an attic, and two or three bays. It has a casement window, a fixed-light window, and a gabled dormer.	II
Park Gate House; 52.88678°N 2.72221°W	—	17th century	The cottage, which has been altered, is in roughcast timber framing on a rendered plinth and has a slate roof. There is one storey and an attic, and two bays. The windows are casements, and there are two gabled dormers.	II
Ruewood Farmhouse; 52.84210°N 2.74821°W	—	17th century	The farmhouse was extended and altered in the late 19th century. The original part is timber framed, with cladding and rebuilding in red brick, and with a roof of slate and tile. There is one storey and an attic, and the farmhouse consists of a two-bay hall range, a single-bay cross-wing at the rear on the left, and a later lean-to in the angle. In the late 19th century a two-storey brick block was added to the right. The windows are casements with segmental heads and there are gabled eaves dormers. Inside the farmhouse is an inglenook fireplace.	II
The Bull and Dog Public House; 52.90387°N 2.70225°W		Mid 17th century	A house, later a public house, it was altered and extended in 1910. The original part is timber framed with rendered infill and a slate roof. There is one storey and an attic, and three bays, and a single-bay extension to the right, with prominent 20th-century extension further to the right. On the front is a gabled porch with barleysugar balusters, the windows are casements, the middle window slightly projecting on curved brackets, and there are three gabled eaves dormers with pointed finials.	II
Yew Tree Farmhouse, Edstaston; 52.87954°N 2.71495°W	—	17th century	The farmhouse was altered and extended in the 18th century. It has a timber framed core, it is encased and extended in painted brick with a dentilled eaves cornice, and has a tile roof with a crow-stepped left gable. There is one storey and an attic, a half-length lean-to at the rear, and a single-storey lean-to on the left gable end. The doorway has an open gabled porch on cast iron columns, the windows are casements with segmental heads, and there are two gabled eaves dormers.	II
Brook Cottage Tilley; 52.84683°N 2.73411°W	—	Early 17th century, based upon dendo dating	A timber framed house with rendered infill on a plinth, with a tile roof. There are two storeys and three bays. On the front is a porch with a gabled hood, and the windows are casements.	II
Lowe Hall; 52.87039°N 2.74321°W	—	1666	The farmhouse was largely remodelled and extended in the 19th century. It has a timber framed core encased in red brick with a stepped eaves cornice, and a tile roof with coped verges on carved kneelers. There are two storeys and an attic, and an L-shaped plan, with a main block of three bays, a two-storey brick outshut, and other extensions at the rear. The central doorway has a rectangular fanlight and a pediment on brackets, the windows are sashes with segmental heads, and here is a datestone with an armorial shield above the middle window in the top floor.	II
Gate piers, Lowe Hall; 52.87027°N 2.74350°W	—	c. 1666	The oldest parts are the moulded stone capping and the pineapple finials. These stand on red brick gate piers dating from the late 19th century. The finials are probably among the earliest representations of pineapples in the country.	II
Patchwork Cottage; 52.91091°N 2.70031°W	—	1667	The cottage was extended in 1843 and later. It is timber framed with rendered infill on a red brick plinth, and has a thatched roof. There is one storey and an attic, two bays on the front, and a 20th-century rear wing. On the front is a gabled porch, the windows are casements, and there are two gabled eaves dormers. Inside are inglenook fireplaces.	II
Barn, Bridge Farm; 52.88970°N 2.70327°W	—	Late 17th century	The barn is timber framed with weatherboarding and corrugated iron cladding, and has a corrugated iron roof. There are two levels, and it contains doorways, windows and an eaves hatch.	II
Chalk Hill Cottage; 52.86712°N 2.76860°W	—	Late 17th century	The cottage is timber framed with painted brick infill, roughcast at the rear, on a plinth, and with a slate roof. There is one story and an attic, three bays, and single-storey lean-tos on the gable ends. The doorway has a gabled porch, the windows are casements, and there is a gabled eaves dormer.	II
Pimhill; 52.85105°N 2.70871°W	—	Late 17th century	The cottage was extended in the 19th century. The original part is timber framed with painted brick infill, the extension is in red brick painted to resemble timber framing, and the roof is tiled. There is one storey and an attic, the doorway has a gabled hood, the windows are casements, and there is a raking eaves dormer.	II
Woodhouse Farmhouse; 52.84490°N 2.71852°W	—	Late 17th century	The farmhouse was remodelled in the 18th century and extended. It is timber framed, mainly roughcast, the hall range has been rebuilt in red brick with a dentilled eaves cornice, and the roof is tiled. There is one storey and an attic, and an L-shaped plan consisting of a long hall range, a taller gabled cross-wing on the left, and a lean-to. On the front is a gabled porch, the windows are casements, and there are gabled half-dormers.	II
Hawthorn Cottage; 52.90367°N 2.70202°W	—	c. 1700	The cottage, which was later extended, is timber framed with red brick infill and a slate roof. There is one storey and an attic, and two bays, with a 19th-century brick extension to the right. The windows are casements, and there are gabled eaves dormers.	II
Pankeymoor Cottage; 52.84508°N 2.72569°W	—	Late 17th to early 18th century	A farmhouse, later a house, that has been extended. It is timber framed with rendered infill on a plinth with a rendered extension and a slate roof. There is one storey and an attic, and three bays. The windows are casements, and there are two gabled eaves dormers.	II
Payne memorial 52.88296°N 2.71810°W	—	c. 1750	The memorial is in the churchyard of St Mary's Church, Edstaston, and is to the memory of members of the Payne family. It is a table tomb in sandstone, and has a plain top ledger resting on six fluted square columns with a rectangular base. On the tomb is a brass plate decorated with a skull and crossbones.	II
Foxholes Farmhouse; 52.88196°N 2.74237°W	—	Mid 18th century	A red brick farmhouse with a floor band, a dentilled eaves cornice, and corner pilasters, and a slate roof with coped verges on carved stone kneelers. There are two storeys and three bays. In the centre is a doorway, the windows are casements, those in the ground floor with segmental heads, and in the centre of the upper floor is a blind window.	II
Sundial, The Ditches Hall; 52.85930°N 2.74943°W	—	Mid 18th century (probable)	The sundial is in the garden to the east of the hall. It is in sandstone, and consists of a vase-shaped baluster with a moulded plinth and ornamental capping. On the circular top is an inscribed plate in lead and brass.	II
Yew Tree Farmhouse; 52.86373°N 2.76085°W	—	Mid 18th century	The farmhouse is in painted brick with a dentilled floor band and a slate roof. There are two storeys and an attic and three bays. The doorway has a segmental head, the windows are casements, and there are three gabled roof dormers.	II
The Lawn; 52.89432°N 2.77448°W	—	Late 18th century (probable)	A red brick house with purple headers, a fluted band, and a dentilled eaves cornice, and a slate roof with coped verges on carved kneelers with pointed stone finials. There are three storeys and three bays. In the centre is a Tuscan porch, and a doorway with pilasters, a rectangular fanlight, and a shaped pediment with a carved anchor. The windows are sashes with wedge lintels and raised keystones.	II
Tilley Farmhouse; 52.84577°N 2.73195°W	—	Late 18th century	A red brick farmhouse on a sandstone plinth, with a floor band, a dentilled eaves cornice, and a tile roof with coped verges on carved stone kneelers. There is an L-shaped plan, consisting of a main block with two storeys and an attic and three bays, and a two-storey rear wing. On the front is a gabled porch and a doorway with a rectangular fanlight, the windows are mullioned and transomed casements, and there are three gabled eaves dormers.	II
Thistleford Bridge; 52.84851°N 2.67921°W		1796	The bridge carries Brockhurst Farm Drive over the River Roden. It is in sandstone, and consists of a single segmental arch. The bridge contains a keystone, a flat string course and a parapet.	II
Limekilns at N.G.R SJ 5234 3296; 52.89198°N 2.71007°W	—	c.1806	The lime kilns, now disused, are built in red brick and sandstone, and consist of four round-arched kilns.	II
Limekilns at N.G.R SJ 5228 3291; 52.89174°N 2.71067°W	—	c.1806	The lime kilns, now disused, are built in red brick and sandstone, and consist of four round-arched kilns.	II
Edstaston Hall; 52.88569°N 2.70751°W	—	1807	A red brick farmhouse on a rendered stone plinth, with cill bands and pilasters, those on the corners with full-height round-arched recesses, and a hipped slate roof. There are three storeys, and a square plan with fronts of three bays. In the centre is a wooden portico and a doorway with pilasters and a rectangular fanlight. The windows are sashes with grooved stone lintels and raised keystones, and on the left return are two canted bay windows. Above the central window in the middle floor is a decorated datestone.	II
Mulliner memorial 52.88320°N 2.71816°W	—	c.1817	The memorial is in the churchyard of St Mary's Church, Edstaston. It is a pedestal tomb in sandstone, and has a square section on a rectangular base. The tomb has a moulded plinth and capping, plain corner pilasters, and a stepped top with a fluted urn-shaped finial.	II
Wolverley Bridge; 52.87596°N 2.78270°W	—	1824	The bridge carries the B5063 road over Whixall Brook. It is in sandstone and consists of a single segmental arch. The bridge has projecting pointed voussoirs, a flat string course, a parapet, and square corner piers.	II
Former lodge, Belle Vue; 52.85911°N 2.74721°W	—	Early 19th century	The former lodge is in red brick with a dentilled eaves cornice and a pyramidal tile roof. There are two storeys and a square plan, with a late single-storey lean-to at the rear. The doorway has an ornamental surround, some windows are rectangular, two windows are round with Maltese cross tracery, and there is an opening containing Gothic tracery.	II
Soulton Bridge; 52.86812°N 2.67548°W		c. 1830	The bridge carries the B5065 road over Soulton Brook. It is in red sandstone and consists of a single segmental arch. The bridge has voussoirs, rusticated soffits, a flat string course and a parapet with rectangular corner piers.	II
Aston Grange; 52.86290°N 2.70364°W	—	c. 1833–36	A rendered house with a cill band, and a hipped slate roof with a belvedere. There are two storeys, a square plan, and a front of three bays. On the front is a Roman Ionic portico and double doors with a rectangular fanlight. The windows are sashes with louvred shutters. In the right return the middle bay projects and has an open pediment.	II
Aston Bridge; 52.85372°N 2.70000°W		1841	The bridge carries Aston Road over the River Roden, and was designed by Edward Haycock. It is in sandstone, and consists of a single segmental arch. The bridge contains a raised keystone, a flat string course, and square end piers.	II
10 Aston; 52.85313°N 2.69926°W		Mid 19th century	The house is in sandstone, with red brick in the gable apex and at the rear, and a slate roof. There are two storeys and two bays. The central doorway has a gabled hood, and the windows are small-paned with round-arched heads.	II
Milepost at N.G.R. SJ 5075 2667; 52.83523°N 2.73230°W	—	Mid 19th century	The milepost is on the east side of the B5476 road. It is in painted cast iron and has a triangular section, a hollow back and a chamfered top. The milepost is inscribed with the distances in miles to "SALOP" (Shrewsbury), and to Wem.	II
Milepost at N.G.R. SJ 5163 3032; 52.86833°N 2.71991°W		Mid 19th century	The milepost is on the east side of the B5476 road. It is in painted cast iron and has a triangular section, a hollow back and a chamfered top. The milepost is inscribed with the distances in miles to Whitchurch, and to Wem.	II
Milepost at N.G.R. SJ 5246 3345; 52.89635°N 2.70804°W		Mid 19th century	The milepost is on the east side of the B5476 road. It is in painted cast iron and has a triangular section, a hollow back and a chamfered top. The milepost is inscribed with the distances in miles to Whitchurch, and to Wem.	II
Milepost at N.G.R. SJ 5422 3584; 52.91804°N 2.68229°W	—	Mid 19th century	The milepost is on the east side of the B5476 road. It is in painted cast iron and has a triangular section, a hollow back and a chamfered top. The milepost is inscribed with the distances in miles to Whitchurch, and to Wem.	II
Milepost at N.G.R. SJ 5272 2951; 52.86108°N 2.70374°W	—	Mid 19th century	The milepost is on the northwest side of the B5065 road. It is in painted cast iron and has a triangular section, a hollow back and a chamfered top. The milepost is inscribed with the distances in miles to "DRAYTON" (Market Drayton), and to Wem.	II
Milepost at N.G.R. SJ 5397 3034; 52.86857°N 2.68541°W	—	Mid 19th century	The milepost is on the north side of the B5065 road. It is in painted cast iron and has a triangular section, a hollow back and a chamfered top. The milepost is inscribed with the distances in miles to "DRAYTON" (Market Drayton), and to Wem.	II
Church of King Charles the Martyr; 52.87966°N 2.77667°W	—	1869	The church was designed by Edward Haycock, Jun. in Early English style. It is built in Grinshill sandstone with a tile roof, and consists of a nave, a gabled south porch, a chancel, and a lean-to north vestry. At the west end is a bellcote, and the windows are lancets.	II
