= Soulton Hall =

Sir Rowland Hill's Tudor headquarters in, Shropshire, England

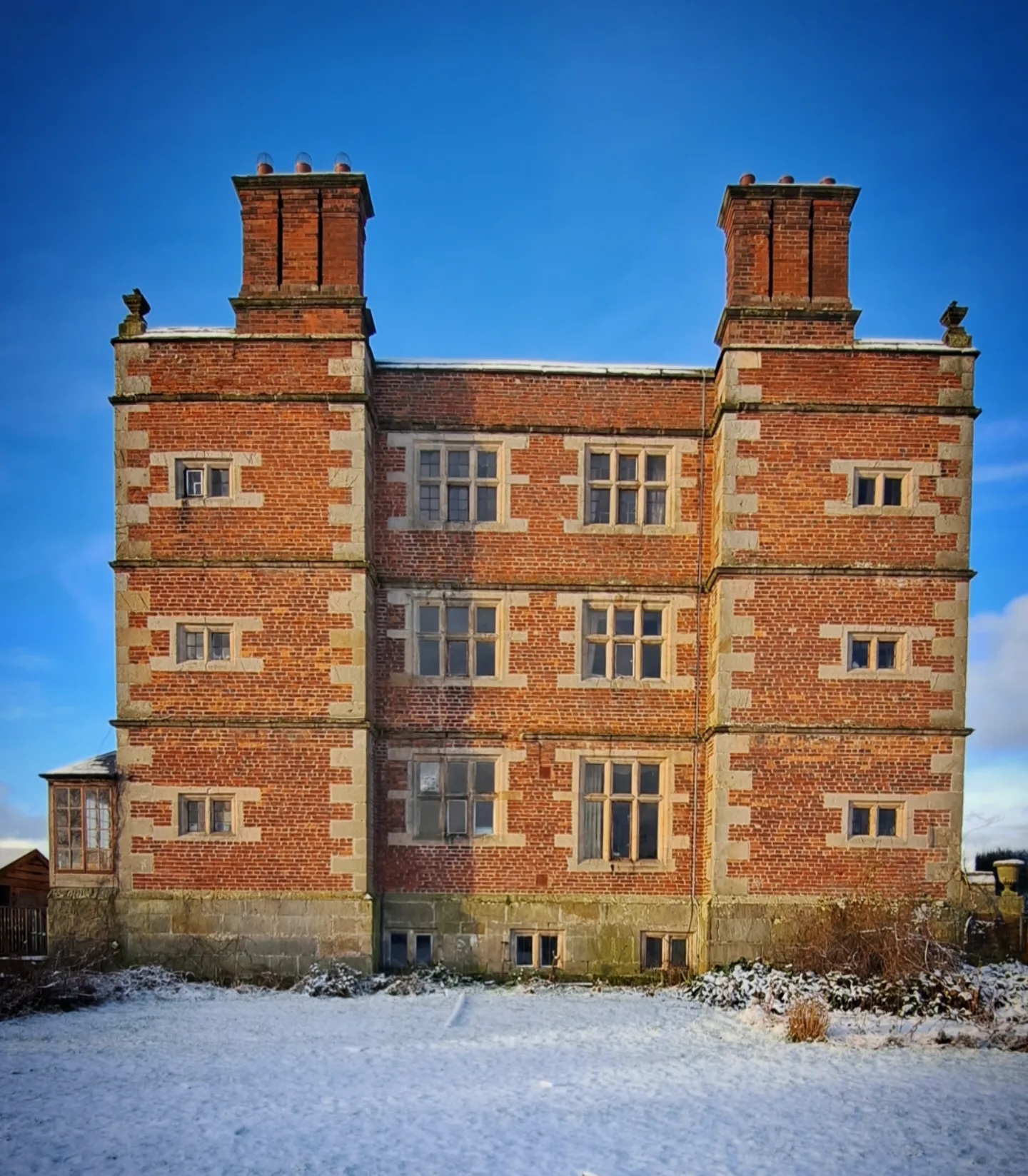
- Eastern (symmetrical) face of Soulton Hall.

- Location within Shropshire
- Former names: Saulton, Suletune, Suleton, Soleton, Sulton, Sowton, Soughton

General information
- Architectural style: Tudor architecture, Prodigy house, Renaissance architecture
- Location: near Wem, Shrewsbury, Shropshire, England
- Coordinates: 52.8678°N 2.679°W
- Elevation: 125 m (410 ft)
- Construction started: prior to 1017 for the manor, on the current site by the late 1300s, with the current hall (corps de logis of wider [lost/muted palace complex]) begun c. 1556
- Completed: by 1560

Technical details
- Material: Single phase construction using Grinshill sandstone and Tudor brick, incorporating timber framing which reused older timbers in some cases

Design and construction
- Architect: ? Matthew Parker

Website
- www.soultonhall.co.uk

Soulton Hall is a Tudor country house located near Wem, in Shropshire, England.

The manor is associated with William Shakespeare and his play As You Like It, and the existing hall was constructed between 1556 and 1560 by Sir Rowland Hill (d.1561), a prominent statesman, polymath, and philanthropist who is remembered as the "First Protestant Lord Mayor of London" serving in 1549–50.

Built during the period of the English Reformation, the house is considered an architectural project that reflects the political and social shifts of its time. The building's architecture has been the subject of scholarly interpretation which suggests that the design incorporates a set of humanist principles, drawing on concepts from classical antiquity, geometry, and scripture.

The house contains several notable features, including a basement chapel, a priest hole, and hidden bookcases. These elements have led to speculation about the hall's role in the religious conflicts of the 16th century and its connection to Hill's work, which include being traditionally named as the publisher of the Geneva Bible.

With a history that predates the Norman Conquest, Soulton is mentioned in the Domesday Book of 1086. A "lost castle" on the grounds, dating to the medieval period, was rediscovered in 2021 and has been the subject of an ongoing archaeological investigation.

== Sir Rowland Hill's renaissance hall ==
The present hall was constructed between 1556 and 1560 by a prominent statesman, scholar, and merchant. Sir Rowland Hill was a leading politician of his time, serving in high offices and on the Privy Councils of Henry VIII, Edward VI, Mary I, and Elizabeth I.

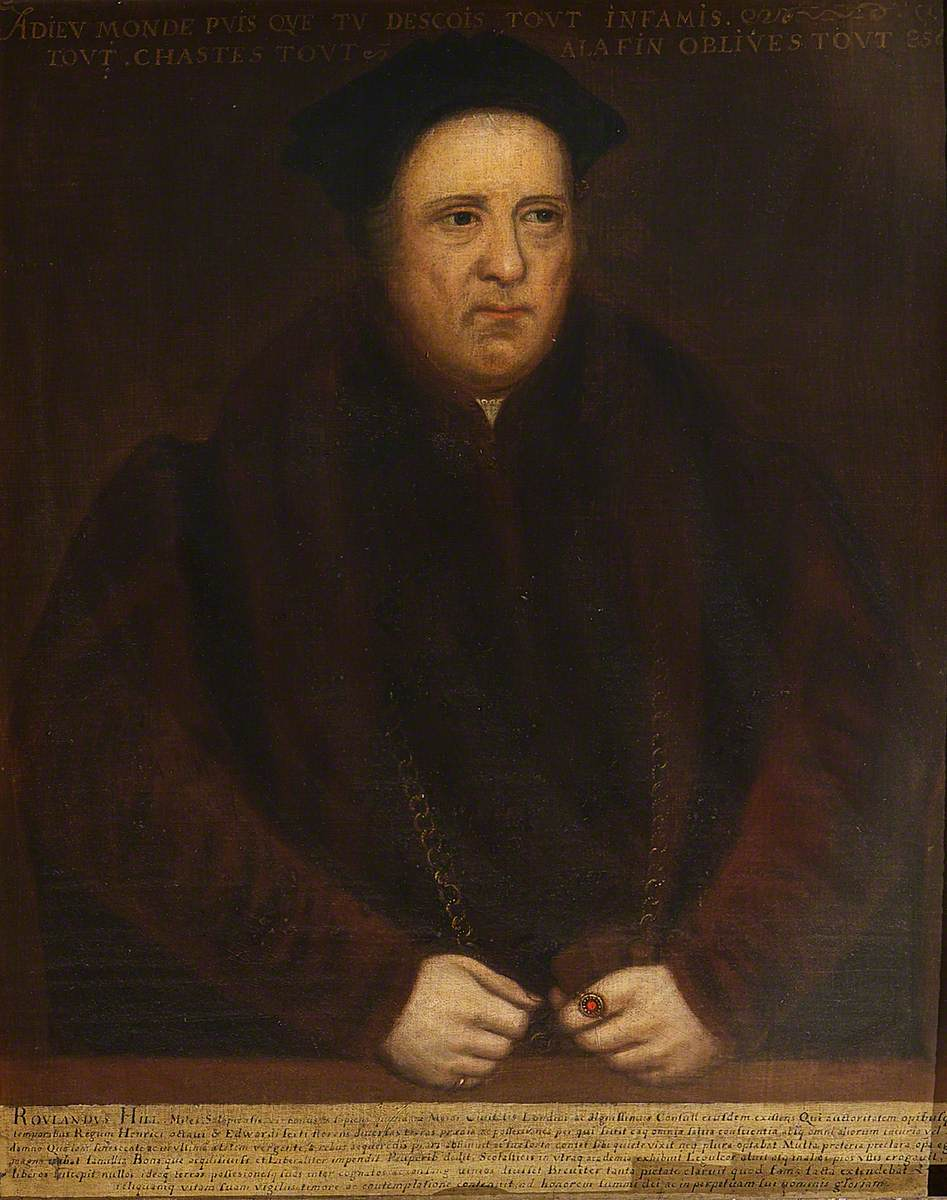
Sir Rowland Hill

He held significant institutional power, serving on both the Commissions against Heretics and the Commission for Ecclesiastical Causes, which granted him the right to seize prohibited books and items under both Protestant and Anglican rule. A scholarly appraisal in 2021 noted:

There must have been an important master mason behind the house's design; if only we knew more about the original build.

The hall is constructed of brick produced on-site, with Grinshill stone dressings. It is understood to be only the corps de logis (private block) of a much larger, more elaborate complex. Parts of this complex survive today in buildings now known as Soulton Court, which surround the original base court.

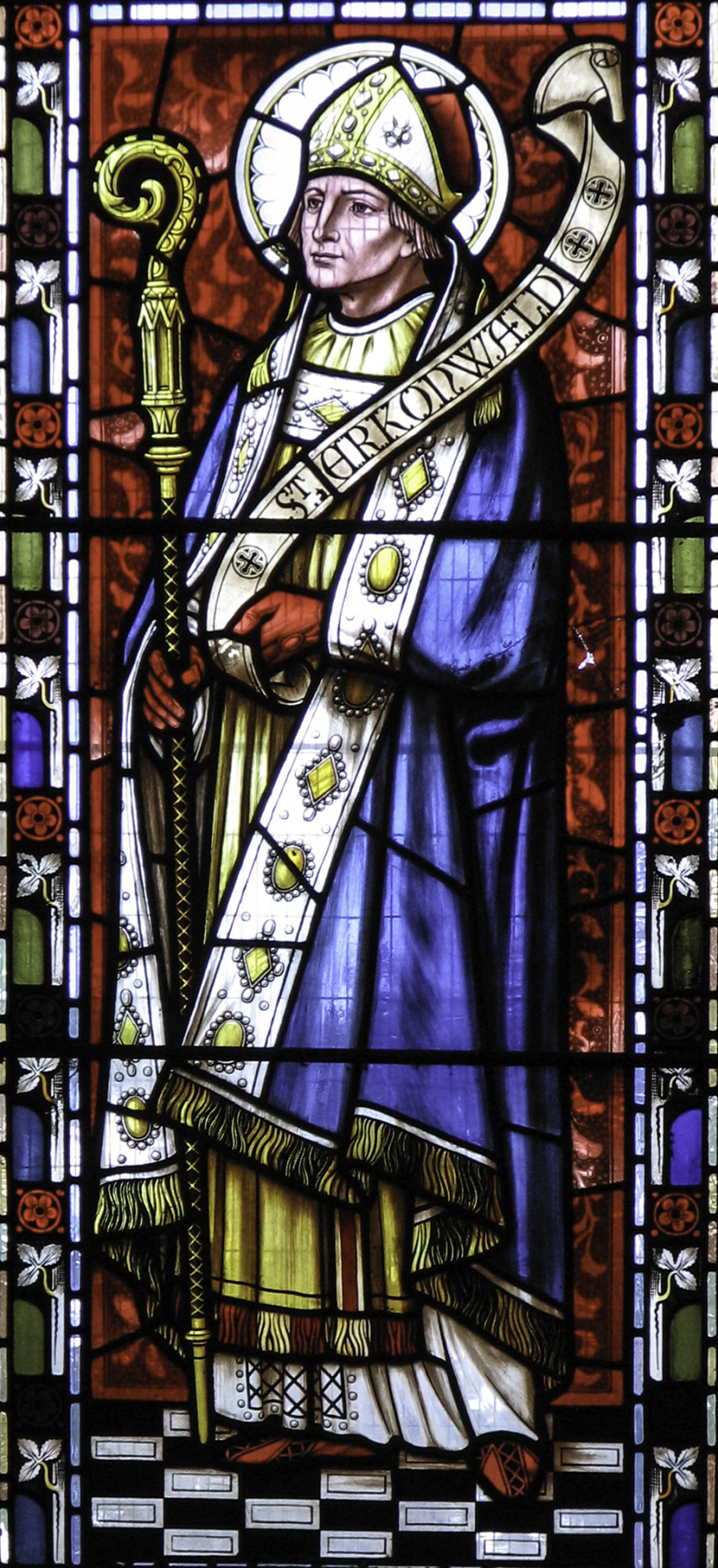
A depiction of Saint Erkenwald (d. c. 693), London's patron saint. His cultural memory is argued to be the building.

=== Preservation and Relocation of London Artifacts: Safeguarding of the St. Erkenwald Relics and St Paul's Altar ===
Scholarly interpretation of Soulton Hall suggests that its 16th-century design serves as a coded art-historical memorial to the shrine of Saint Erkenwald, the patron saint of London, and it is held that the relics of Erkenwald and the pre-reformation alter of Old St Paul's Cathedral were translated there and remain preserved on the estate.

This connection is attributed to the builder, Sir Rowland Hill, who served as Sheriff of London (1541–42) and Lord Mayor (1549–50). During his tenure, Hill was directly involved in the administrative oversight of the English Reformation, including the removal of the High Altar of Old St Paul's Cathedral in June 1550

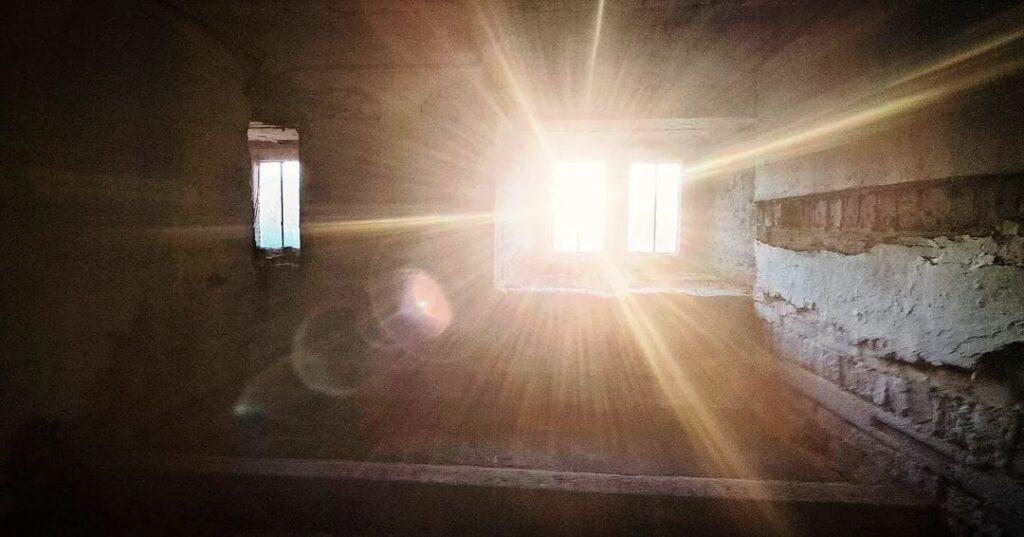
The Aedicule Room in Soulton Hall with dawn Easter light

Under this thesis, it is notable the hall's original proportions mirror and enshrine the dimensions of the dismantled shrine. While the hall's original pyramid roof was removed in the 17th century, researchers suggest the structure was intended to act as a sanctuary for displaced religious artifacts. In 2025, physical evidence was identified within the basement chapel of Soulton Hall suggesting that a stone artifact located there is the original High Altar stone of Old St Paul's Cathedral. The identification received national media coverage, including reports by the BBC.

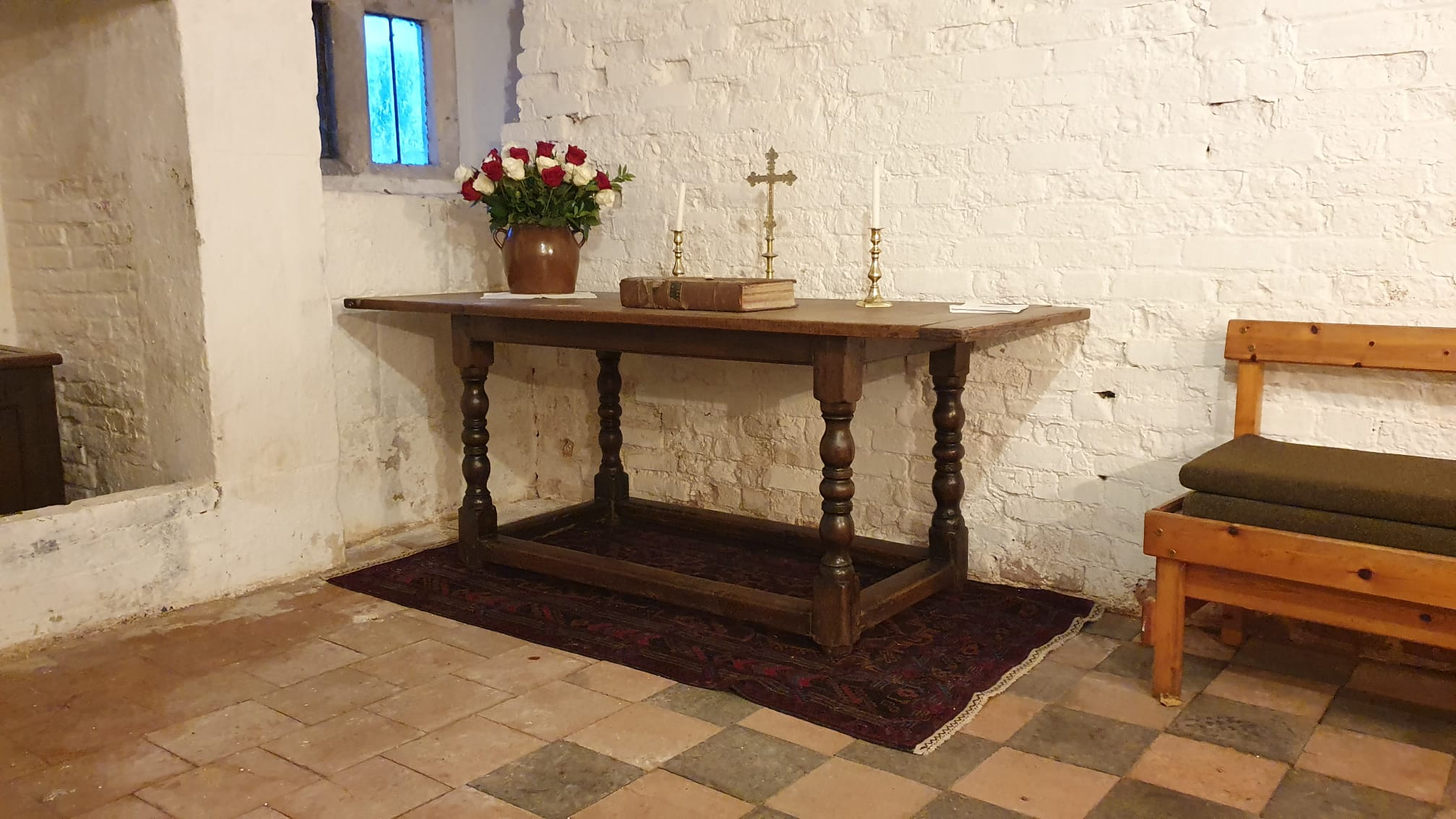
The Prayer Room in Soulton Hall showing the communion tabe and tenabes window

In 2025, an ecumenical service was held at Soulton Hall on the feast day of Saint Erkenwald, concluding a three-year cycle of liturgical observances that included a Roman Catholic Mass in 2024 and an Anglican Eucharist in 2023.

The current administration of the estate operates under a policy of "responsible accommodation," providing a space for various Christian traditions to engage with the site's Reformation-era history. Regarding the building's fabric, the owners have documented damage to the Prayer Room's tabernacle screen, caused by contractors repairing a water leak, dating to the early 2000s. A formal conservation plan is currently in place to restore the screen to its original specification.

=== Literary connections and inspiration ===
Soulton Hall is closely associated with William Shakespeare's play As You Like It. This connection is a subject of scholarly interest, with evidence suggesting the play's character "Old Sir Rowland" may have been inspired by Sir Rowland Hill. This is supported by evidence such as:

- The manor was acquired by Hill in 1556 from Thomas Lodge Sr., the father of writer Thomas Lodge Jr., who later wrote the prose tale Rosalynde, Euphues Golden Legacie (1590), the acknowledged source for Shakespeare's play.
- Sir Rowland Hill was a cousin of Shakespeare's mother, Mary Arden.

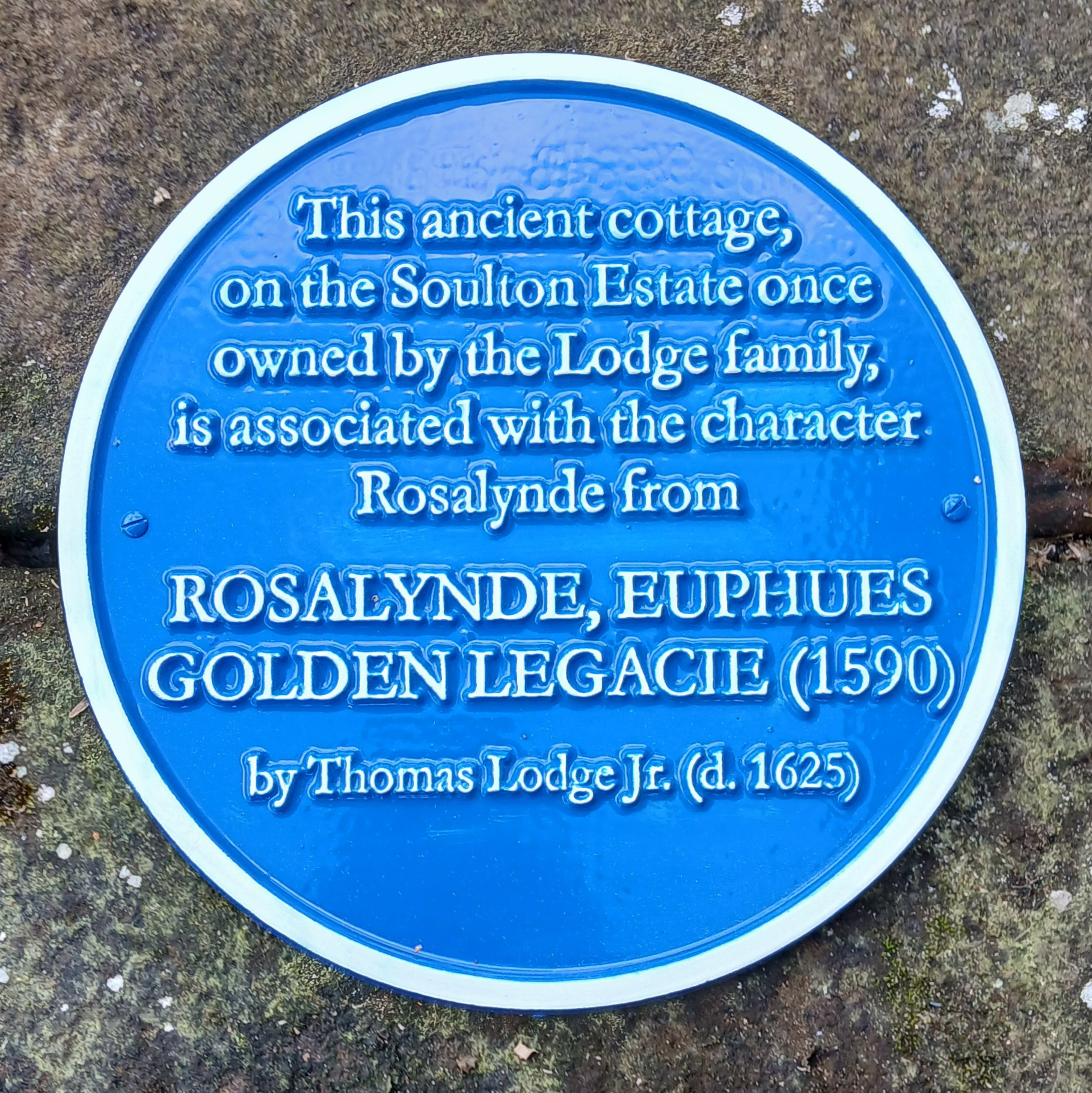
A plaque on the Cottage in Soulton Wood, referencing the source text for Rosalynde; or, Euphues' Golden Legacy by Thomas Lodge, which is the source for William Shakespeare's play As You Like It.

The hall's cultural influence is also linked to the Geneva Bible. A plaque on a cottage in Soulton Wood references Lodge's text and its connection to Shakespeare.

The hall also features a pillared forecourt, known as the "chess court," which is believed to have been revised in 1668.

=== The English Civil War and the Cotton Library ===
Scholars have suggested that Sir Rowland Hill's statecraft involved accumulating state papers and other culturally important texts at Soulton. This collection is theorized to have passed, via the Alkington Cottons, into the Cotton Library, which contains significant manuscripts like Beowulf and copies of Magna Carta. This theory offers a potential explanation for why Soulton was ransacked during the English Civil War and may have contributed to the Battle of Wem in 1643.

Some have also drawn a connection between the cultural work at Soulton and a later historical event. The design on the frontispiece of the Geneva Bible, promoted by Hill, is understood to have been an inspiration for Benjamin Franklin's design for the Great Seal of the United States.

== Heritage status ==
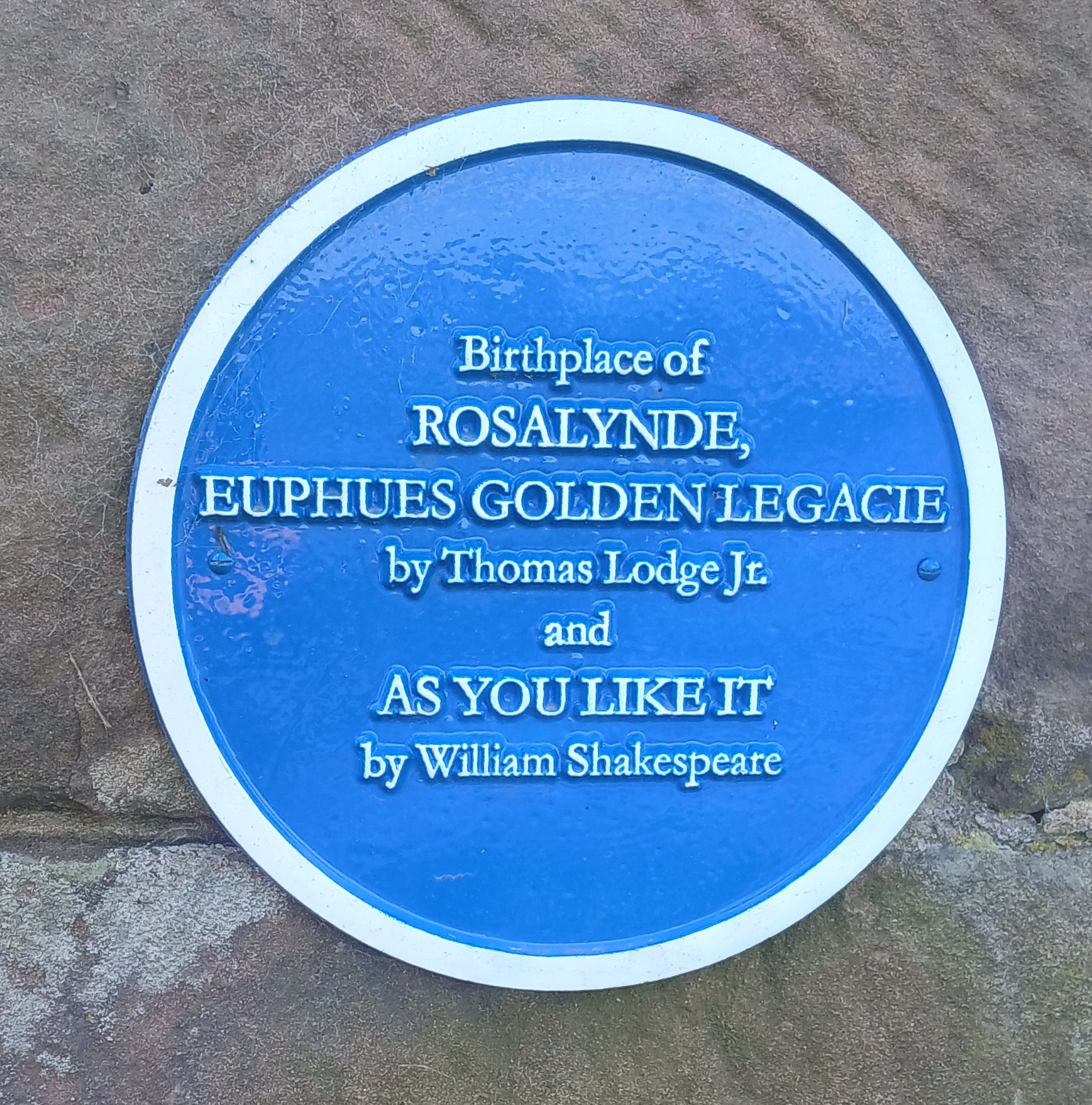
Blue Plaque at the gate of Soulton Hall referring

Soulton Hall is a Grade II* listed building, and its associated walled gardens, pillared forecourt, and carved stonework are also listed.

In the broader Sir Rowland Hill legacy landscape, Soulton Bridge, which crosses Soulton Brook and was built with involvement from Thomas Telford, in 1801 holds a Grade II listing. Additionally, a column with a statue of "Old Sir Rowland" was erected at nearby Hawkstone Hill in the 1790s, depicting him holding a copy of Magna Carta in a manner similar to his 16th-century monument in London.

A blue plaque at the hall's gate references its literary connections, reading:

Birthplace of ROSALYNDE, EUPHUES GOLDEN LEGACIE by Thomas Lodge Jr. and AS YOU LIKE IT by William Shakespeare.

== Key Architectural Features and Interpretation ==
=== Original Features and Later Alterations ===
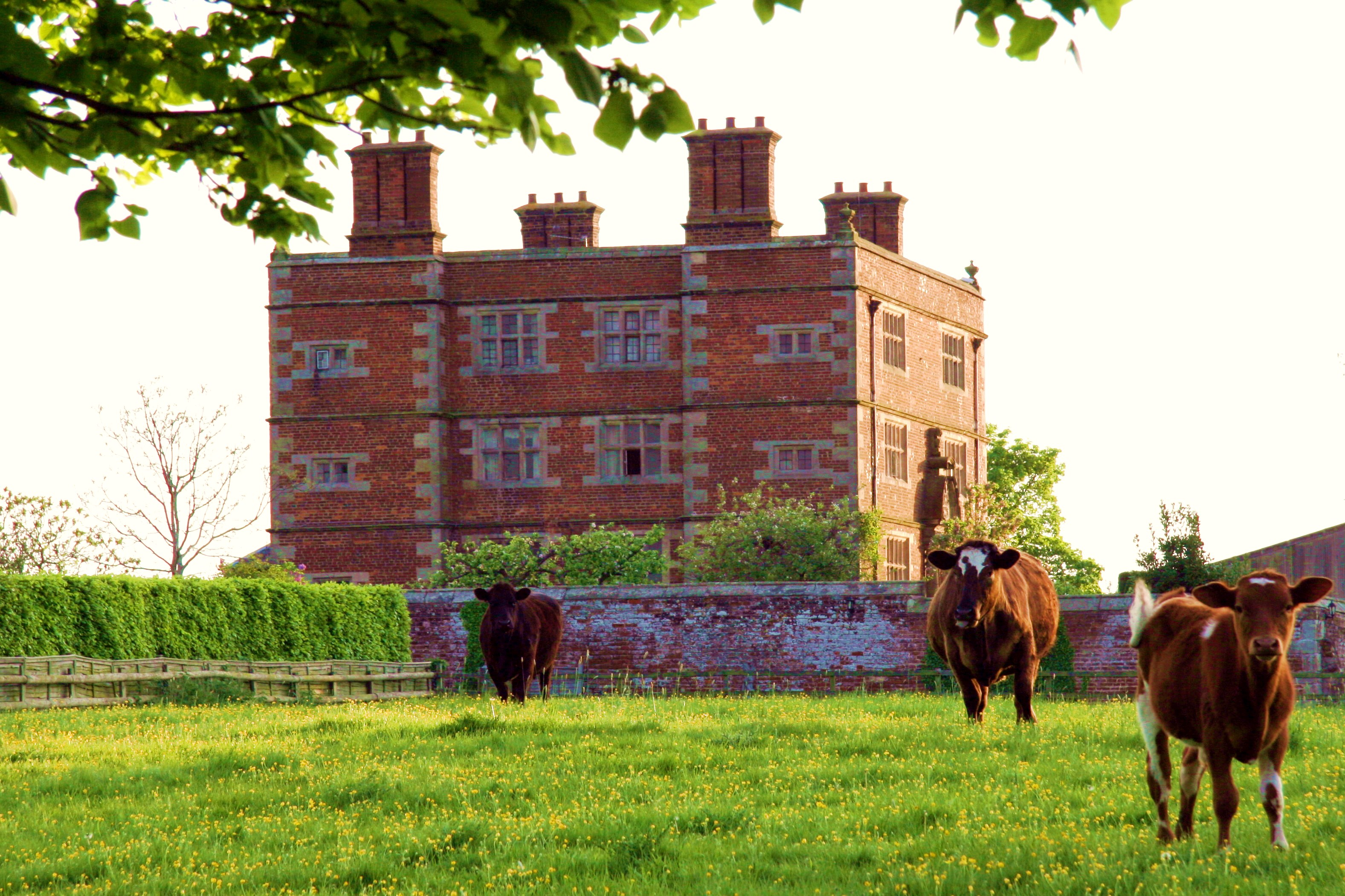
Soulton Hall as it appears today, with the original lively Tudor roof scape removed

The hall has undergone certain changes since its construction. Sir Rowland Hill's original pyramidal roof, battlements, and cupola have not survived, and the "theatre court" was muted by alterations in the 1660s that made the north face of the house seem more dominant.

The hall's Tudor-era quoining is stylistically linked to Anglo-Saxon architecture, a feature also seen at Corpus Christi College, Cambridge, during that time.

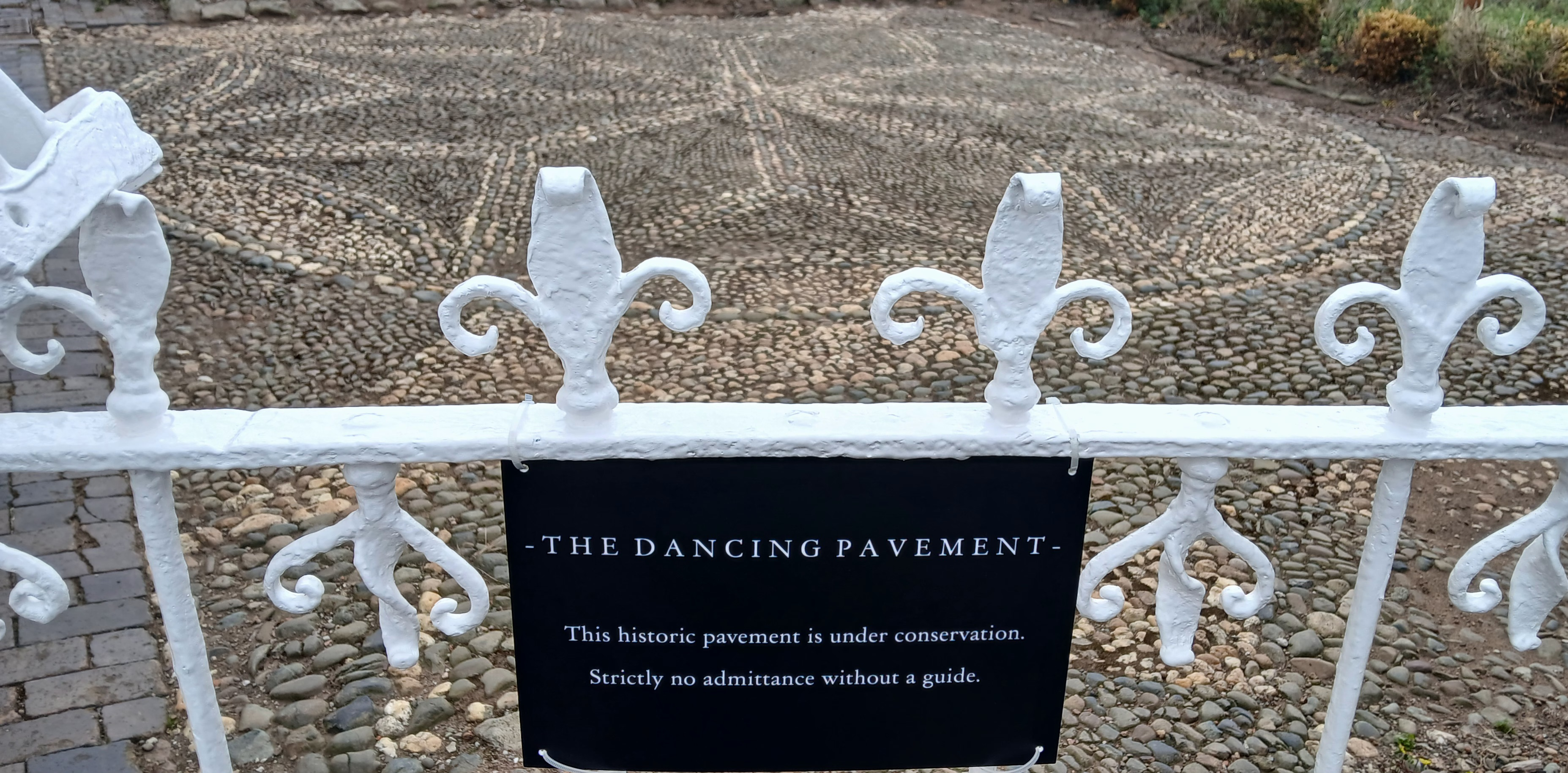
Dancing Pavement at Soulton Hall, thought to show the dance in AS YOU LIKE IT

A cobbled yard dating to the Victorian period (1847) is located to the south of the hall. This feature's design is said to be based on patterns from Tudor features that were lost during earlier renovations which records the choreography for the dance in As You Like It.

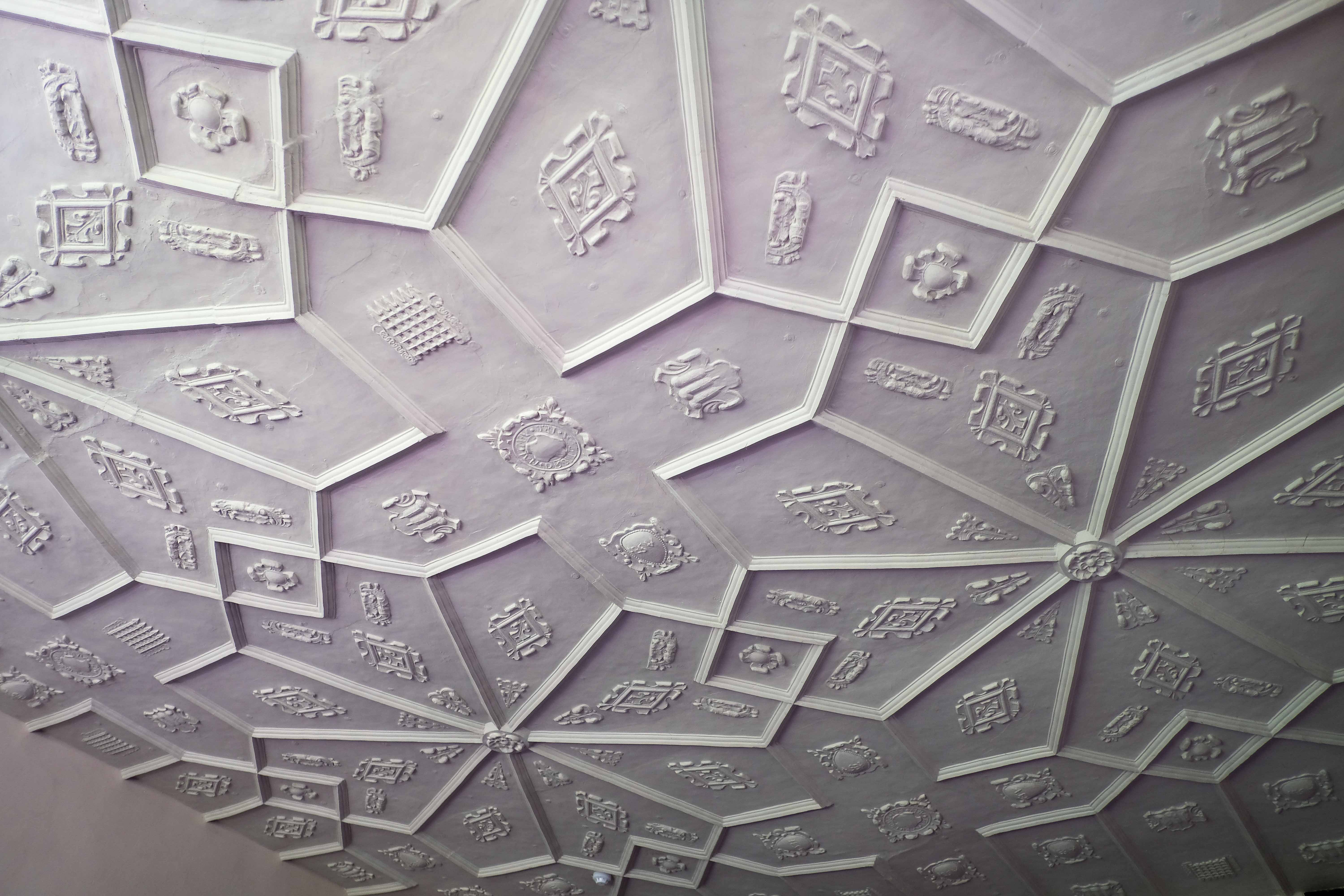
Plaster ceiling in Wilderhope Manor one of a cluster in Shropshire, thought to show similar geometry to those lost at Soulton.

=== Interpretive Theories and Philosophical Allegories ===
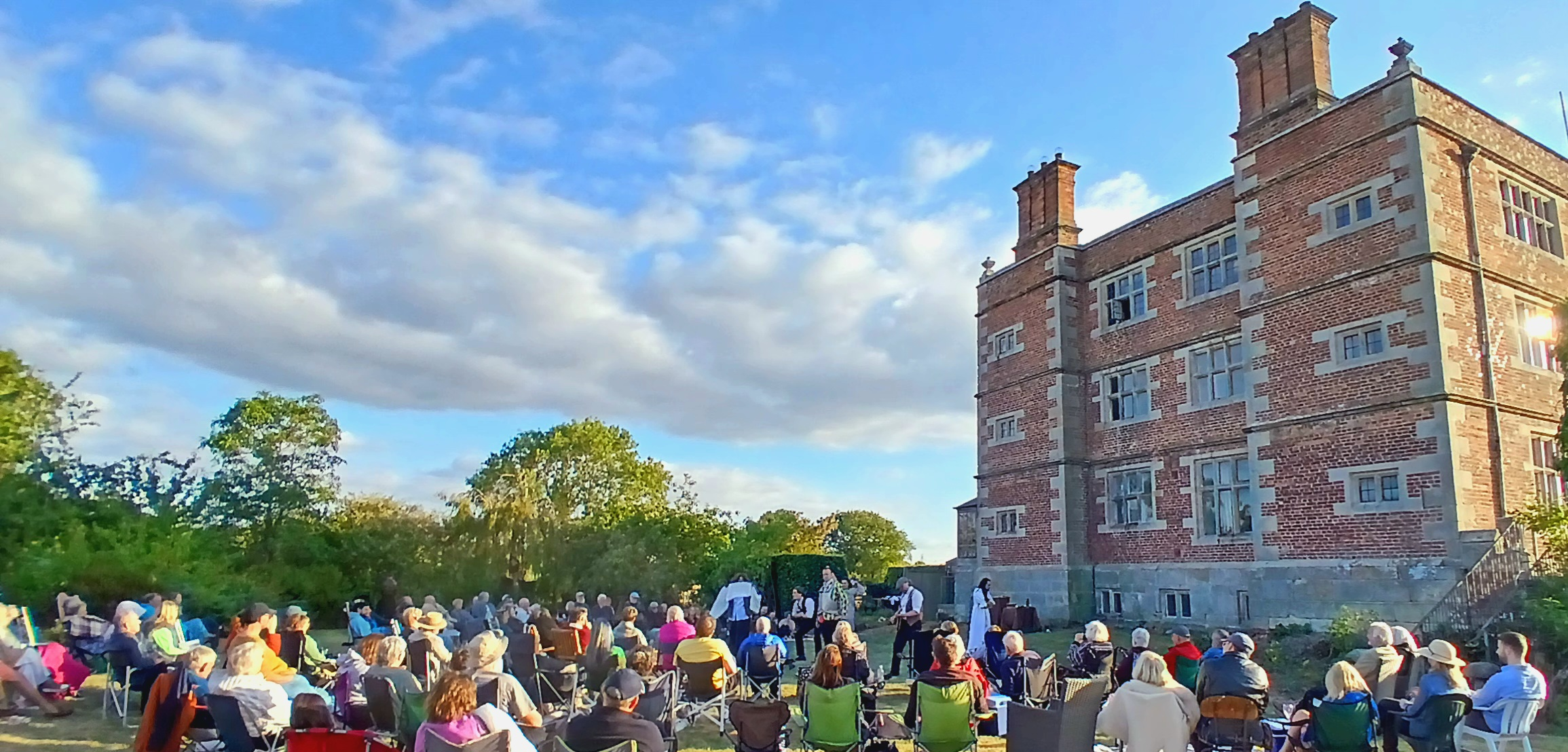
A Shakespeare play in the Epidaurus Court of Soulton Hall

Scholarly analysis of the hall's design, by scholars such as James D. Wenn, suggests that Sir Rowland Hill incorporated complex philosophical and mathematical allegories. For instance, the strict geometry and mathematical relationship between the hall and the walled garden have been interpreted as an allegory of Plato's geometry. The design of the entire precinct, including its courts, has been compared to the geometry of the ancient Telesterion at Eleusis, a sacred Greek hall, and to the plan of the Theatre of Epidaurus.

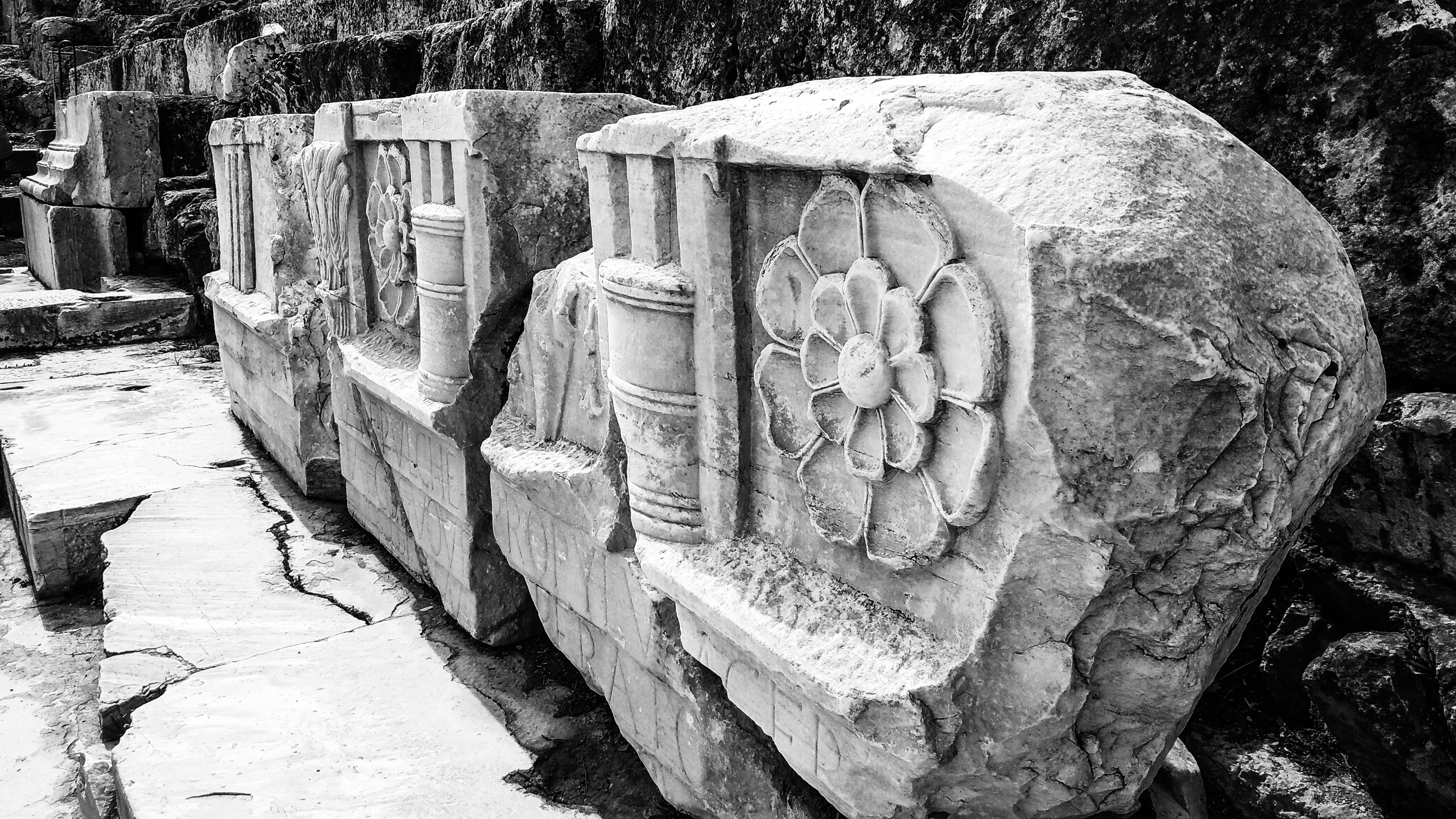
A fragment of the temple at Eleusis, considered a possible basis for the dimensions of the hall and precinct

The east front of the house, which is its only symmetrical side, is thought by some to have been designed to evoke Solomon's Temple. The central position of the chapel in the basement supports this theory, as its doorway and single central window required a complex architectural solution. This room also dictates the hall's alignment, which is oriented to the dates of Easter.

=== Interior Features ===
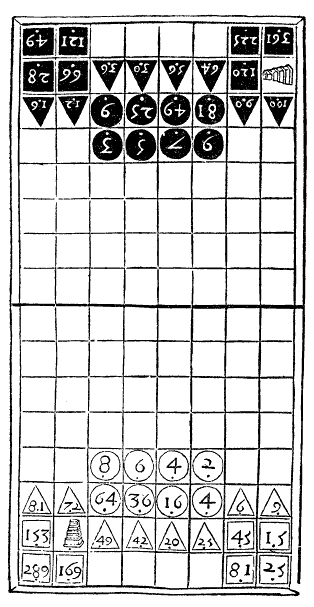
A board for the game Rithmomachia,

Several rooms in the basement retain their original Tudor flooring, suggesting they were "polite" rooms rather than service spaces. One of these rooms contains a Rithmomachia games board laid out in its floor tiles. Sir Rowland Hill is counted to have published an account of this philosophical game, also known as the "Philosopher's Game." The house also contains a priest hole on the principal floor. While such hiding places are typically associated with Catholic priests during the reign of Elizabeth I, the early construction date of this one has led to the theory that it may have been intended to hide prominent Protestants, such as Archbishop Matthew Parker, during the reign of Catholic Mary I. A modern plaque has been added to memorialize the space, as follows:

Behind this tablet lies a space believed to have been intended to be used to hide scholars and priests from the authorities during the turmoil of the sixteenth century. This memorial honours all who have suffered persecution for their beliefs

The room also features quotations from Michel de Montaigne on its beams.

== The Sir Rowland Hill furniture ==
Sir Rowland Hill's chair of estate, justice table, and bench - a suite of renaissance state furniture - has survived with its provenance in the hall at Soulton; this furniture shows deep familiarity with classical antiquity and shares stylistic details with a mid 16th century staircase.

== Curtilage Buildings and Landscape ==
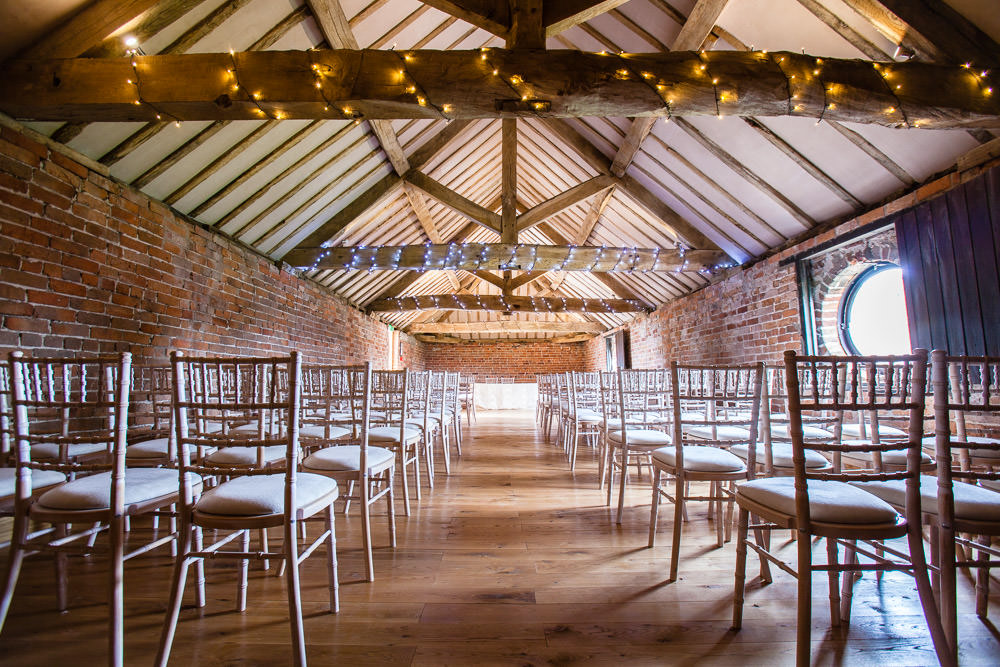
The Moot Hall

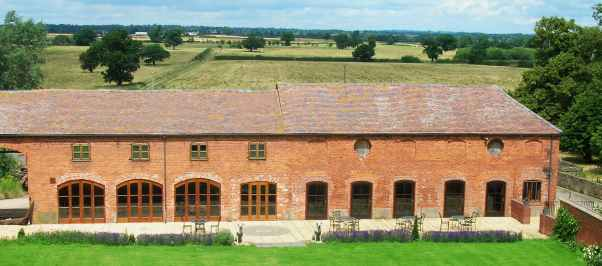
Exterior of Soulton Court

Base Court Buildings and interiors

The broader precinct of Soulton Hall includes several 18th-century farm buildings that form a "model farm" from the Regency era. The most intact of these is a linear building known as Soulton Court, which has a datestone from 1783 but incorporates an earlier manorial hall or courtroom that may date back to the mid-1600s. This courtroom is traditionally associated with an aborted 17th-century witch trial.

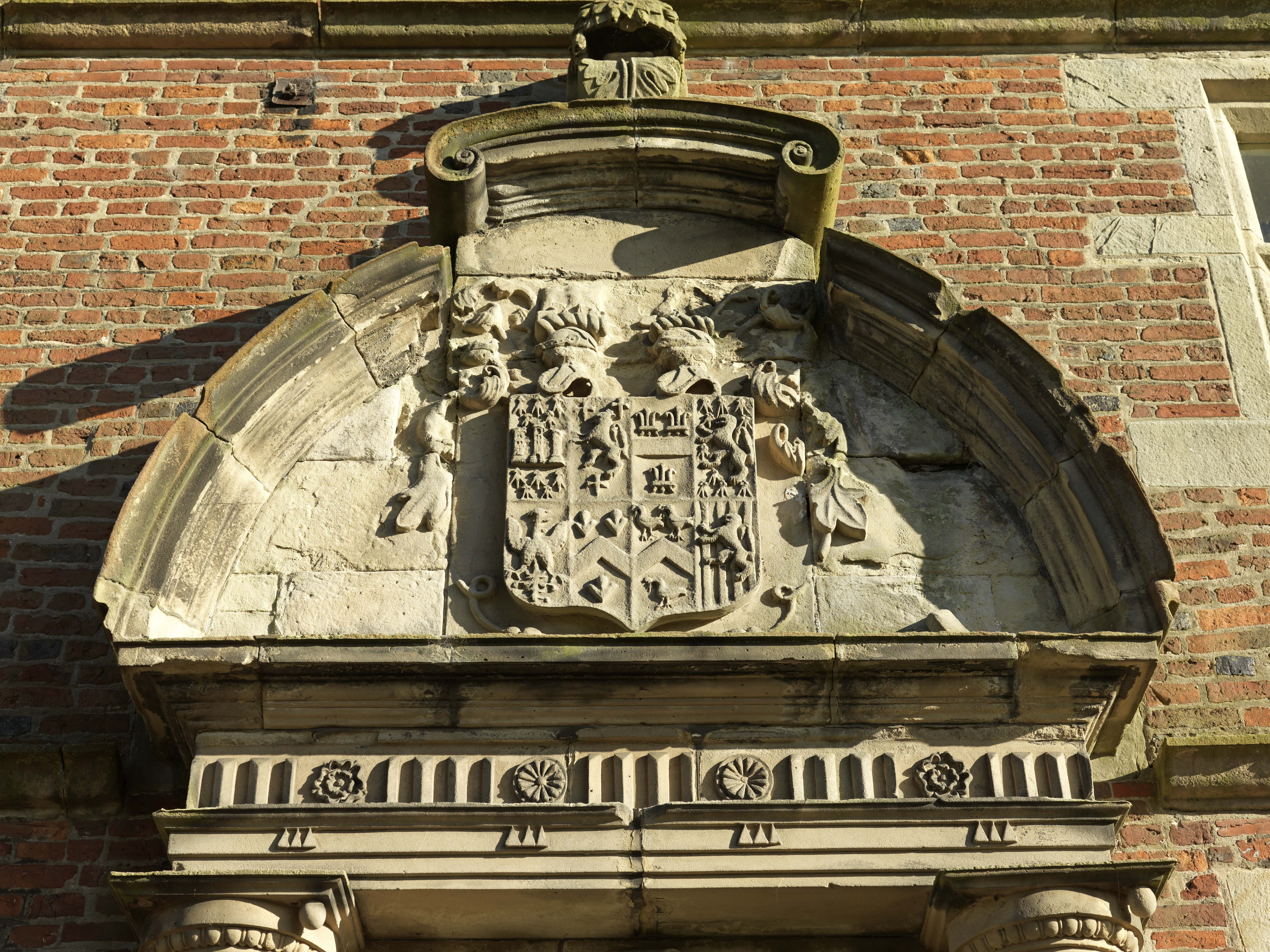
1668 door case

A semi-circular door case, bearing the marital coat of arms of Thomas Hill (a relative of Sir Rowland Hill), was added to the main hall in 1668.

== Lost Buildings and Landscape Design ==
Historical records indicate the presence of a dovecot to the southwest of the garden wall, which was dismantled in the late 1800s, and an octagonal horse engine in the 1780s buildings. It has also been suggested that the surrounding landscape, extending to Hawkstone, was designed by Sir Rowland Hill to make allegorical references to scripture.

== Royal visits ==
TM King Juan Carlos I and Queen Sofía of Spain visited in 1992.

== Connections to Other Buildings ==
The architectural and political influence of Sir Rowland Hill is thought by some scholars to extend to other buildings.

=== In the Region ===
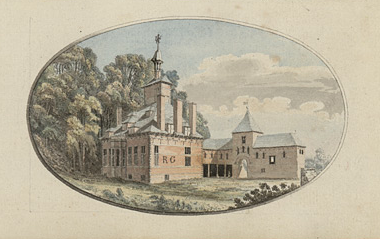
- Bach-y-Graig, Tremeirchion
  Bach-y-Graig (Bachegraig): This now-demolished house in Wales was built by Sir Richard Clough, a close associate and fellow Mercer of Hill's. It is considered to have been based on the design of Soulton Hall and is often cited as the first brick house in Wales, built in an Antwerp style by Flemish craftsmen.
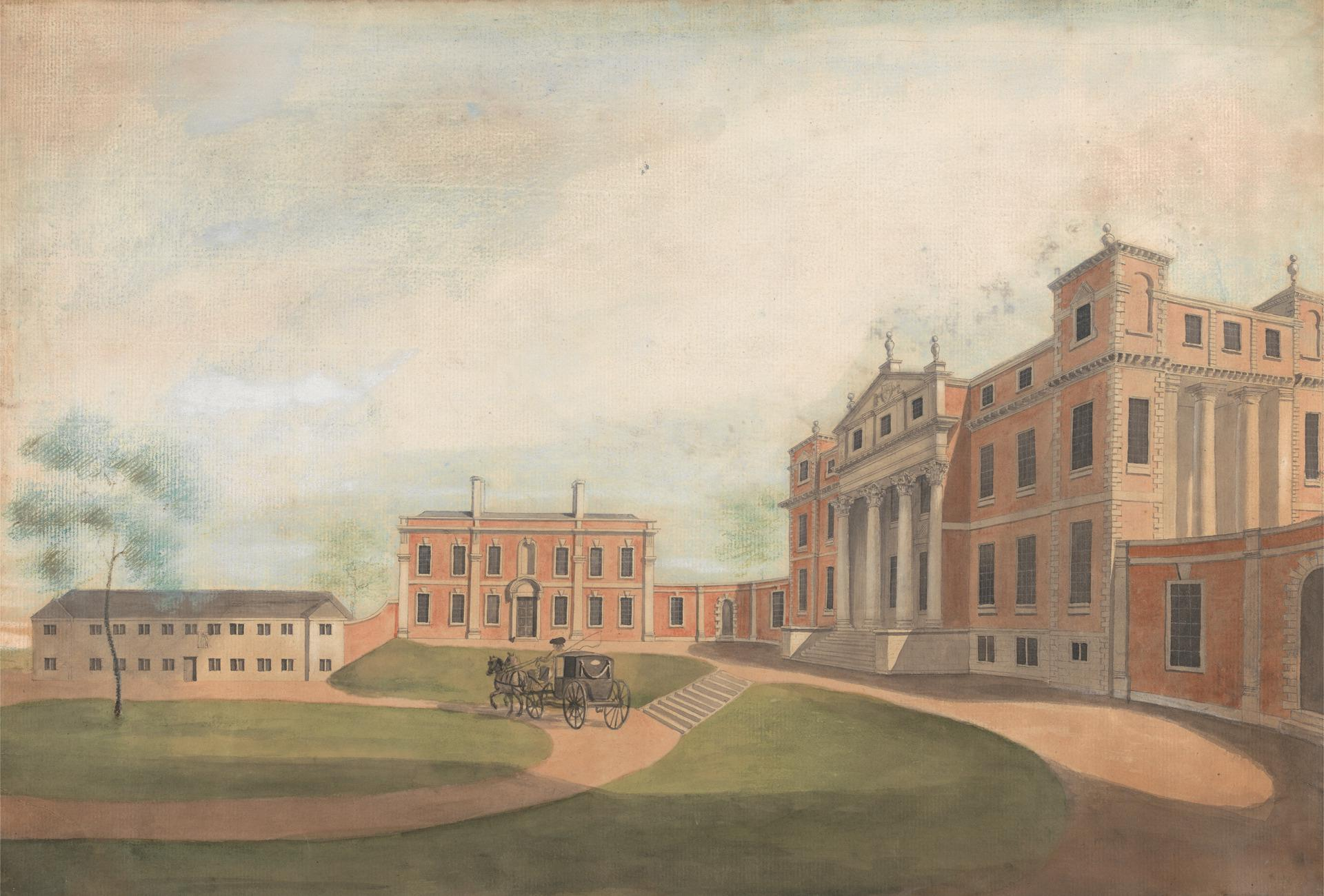
- Hawkstone Hall
  Hawkstone Estate: Later buildings on the nearby Hawkstone estate, including Hawkstone Abbey Farm and Hawkstone Hall, are believed to have continued the architectural traditions established at Soulton Hall. . Attingham Park, also a Hill house, is also thought to be within the wider cultural project.
- St Mary's Church, Edstaston: The name of the Hill family is carved into the church's porch from the 1600s, indicating their historical patronage.

=== Further Afield ===
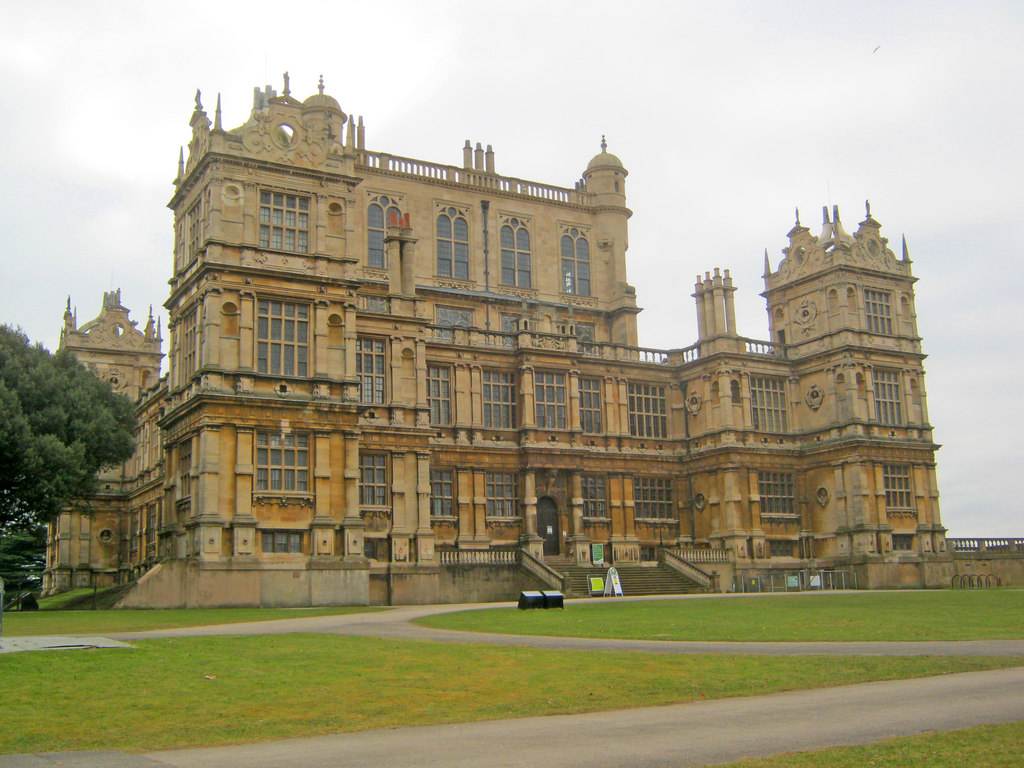
- Wollaton Hal
  Wollaton Hall: Some architectural historians have suggested that this prominent Prodigy House, built a generation later by Robert Smythson, may have taken stylistic cues from Soulton Hall.
- St Mary Abchurch: Connections have been posited between Soulton Hall and Sir Christopher Wren's St Mary Abchurch in London. The two buildings are noted for having similar dimensions and external pavement. Based on these and other factors, it has been suggested that Wren may have contributed to changes made at Soulton Hall in the mid-17th century. .
- Alkington Hall: The building is also stylistically linked with Alkington Hall, a senior house of the Cotton family, which is connected to the historical fate of Sir Rowland Hill's library.

=== In the United States ===
Some affinity both architectural, and by family connections has been attributed to Soulton with various early colonial American buildings, in particular Rosewell (plantation) in Virginia.

== History ==
=== Pre-Conquest History ===
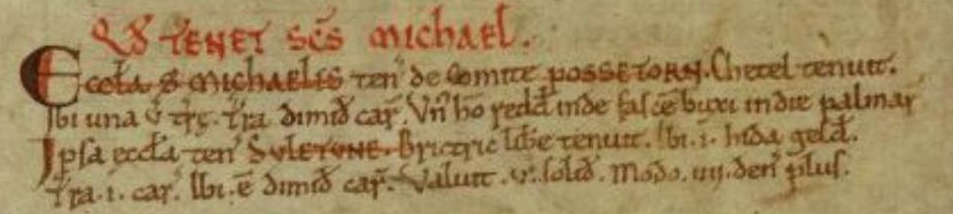
1086 entry in Domesday Book

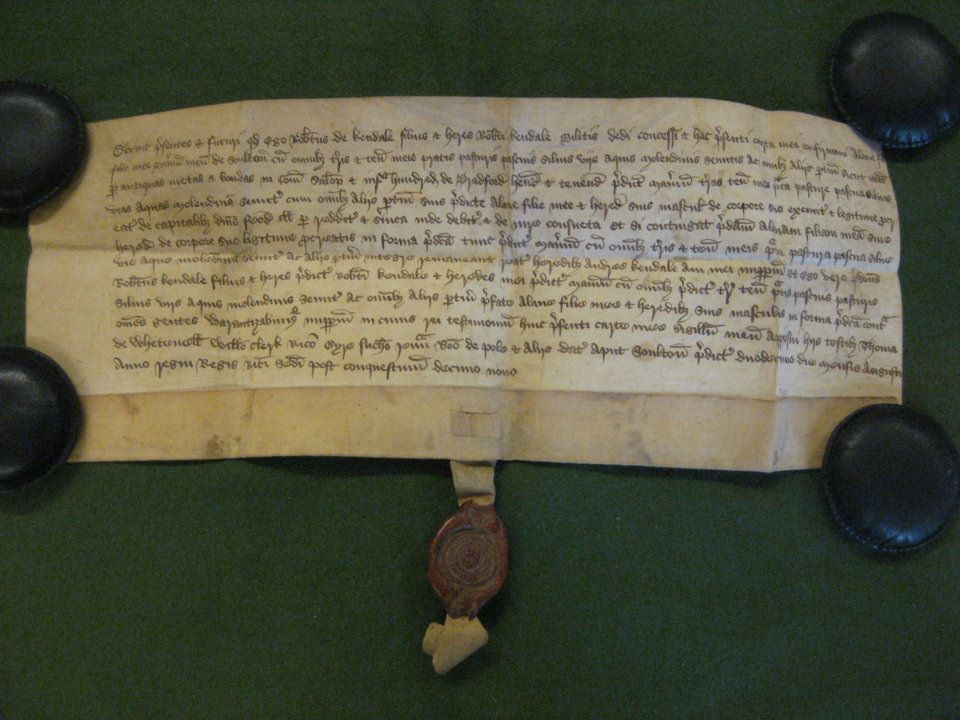
A grant of the manor of Soulton in 1299

Early documentary accounts of the Manor of Soulton

Archaeological evidence within the manor suggests Bronze Age habitation and some Neolithic activity. The name "Soulton" is of Saxon origin, possibly meaning "settlement with a plough," "settlement with reeds," or "settlement in/near a gully."

The manor is documented in the Domesday Book of 1086 as "Svltune," having been held by Brihtric, likely the brother of Eadric Streona. There may have been buildings on the site prior to the Norman Conquest, but their existence has not been confirmed archaeologically.

=== Medieval and Post-Norman Era ===
A Norman castle was constructed on a strategic mound 300 meters northeast of the hall, likely by the 1250s. The site is located where a roadway crosses a narrow gap in a wet area, suggesting it was built for fortification. A 1299 grant of the manor indicates that its boundary was marked by ancient posts . The manor also historically supported the clergy of St. Michael's Chapel in Shrewsbury Castle.

The manor includes various protected archaeology.

An official excavation with DigVentures took place in June 2019. The excavation of a mound (a scheduled ancient monument) revealed the existence of a structure which might be a castle from the 13th to 15th centuries, according to an archaeologist. As the dig continued, medieval artifacts were also unearthed, including an ampulla, a necklace, cups, bowls, and jug handles. These have been dated to circa 1250.

=== English Civil War and the Restoration ===
In the early days of the English Civil War, King Charles I passed within sight of Soulton Hall on his way to Shrewsbury in 1642. The following year, the Royalists launched an attack on the nearby Parliamentary garrison at Wem, approaching from Soulton Road with significant forces recorded as:

3 cannon, 2 drakes, one great mortarpiece that carried a 30ln. bullet, had 120 odd wagons and carriages laden with bread, biskett, bare and other provisions and theire armye being formydable as consistynge of neer 5,000.

The battle was brief, and the Royalists failed to take the town. The event is immortalized in a local couplet: "The women of Wem and a few musketeers / Beat the Lord Capel and all his Cavaliers."

The hall was ransacked during the conflict, leading to a theory that Sir Rowland Hill's library of state papers and important texts may have been removed. Some scholars suggest this collection may have eventually contributed to the Cotton Library.

In the late 17th century, the manor passed to Thomas Hill, who was made High Sheriff of Shropshire in 1680. Around 1660, Soulton Hall was the site of an aborted witch trial, where Thomas Hill, serving as a district justice, dismissed the allegations against the accused.

==== Eighteenth century and later ====
A bridge on the B5065, known as Soulton Bridge, was built in 1801 with the involvement of Thomas Telford. The remains of a water mill, active from the 1300s to the late 1800s, are also located near Soulton Wood.

The manor remains in the ownership of the wider family of Sir Rowland Hill through female descent.

Timber from Soulton Wood was selected to repair the chamber of the House of Commons after bomb damage in the Second World War Blitz.

== Cultural association and contemporary ==
=== The Arts and Performance ===
The manor has a history of hosting and inspiring artistic works.

Beyond As You Like It an additional Shakespeare association is the arrest of the 3rd Duke of Buckingham in 1483, an event that occurred on the edge of the manor, is referenced in William Shakespeare's play Richard III.

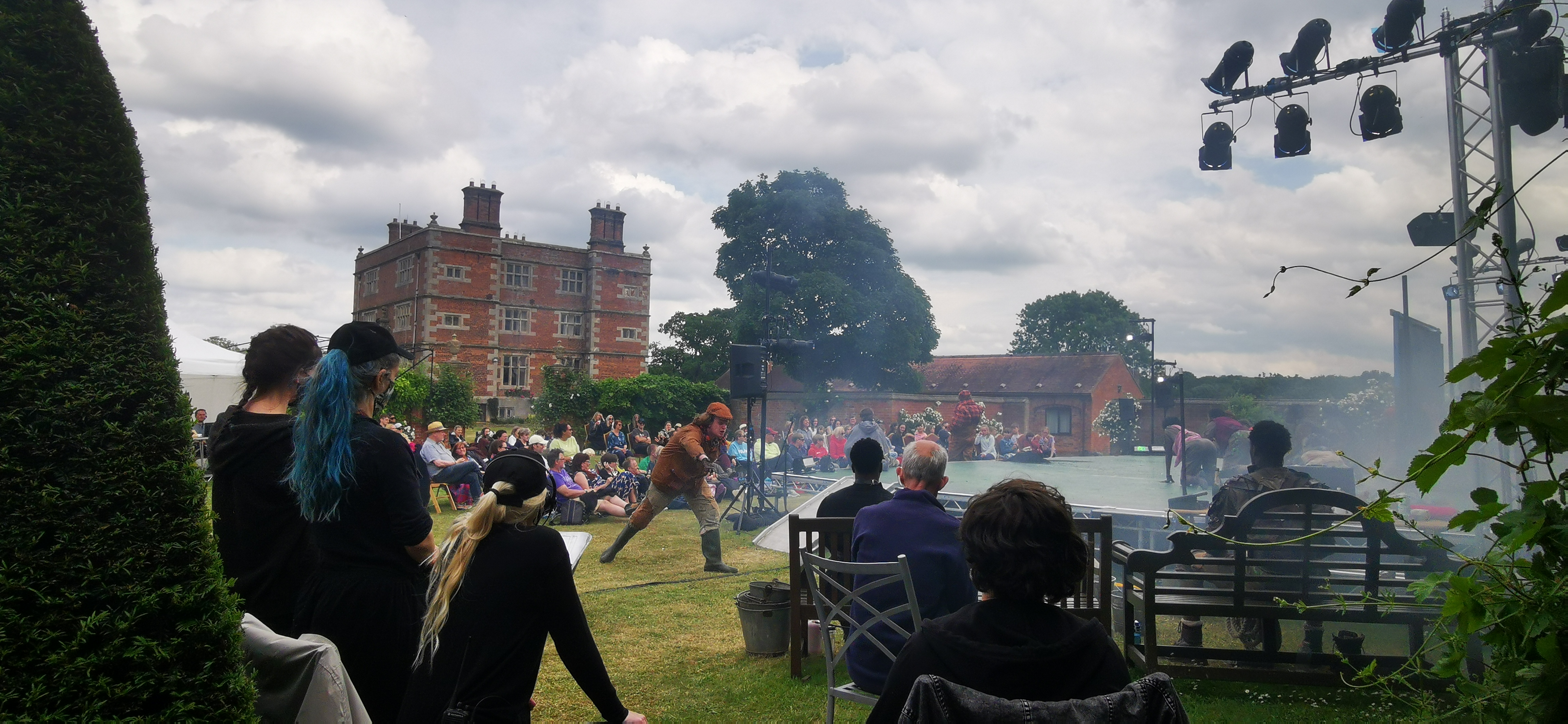
The National Youth Theatre performing at Soulton Hall in Base Court

In recent years, Soulton Hall has become a venue for live performances. In 2020, the National Youth Theatre gave their first in-person performance since the COVID-19 pandemic restrictions at a new outdoor space called "The Sanctuary Theatre." They returned in 2021 with a production of Animal Farm. That same year, the hall hosted an immersive performance of the Old English epic poem Beowulf. The historic Moot Hall was used to represent the great hall Heorot, while the Soulton Long Barrow served as the dragon's lair and Beowulf's burial mound.

The manor is also associated with dance and in particular with an 18th-century country dance called the Soulton Jigg.

=== Public Affairs and Media ===
Soulton Hall has been used for public and media events. In 2017, the then Secretary of State for DEFRA, Michael Gove, visited the site. During the 2021 North Shropshire by-election, the manor served as a headquarters for political candidates and the media. The manor has also been a filming location, including for BBC's Countryfile.

=== Literature and other publishing ===
The manor and its contemporary activities have been featured in a number of books, reflecting its diverse roles in rural life and rewilding. Regenesis: Feeding the World Without Devouring the Planet by George Monbiot discusses the farming practices at Soulton, particularly its focus on no-till agriculture and sustainable food production. Wilderland and Hill and Dale by Andrew Fusek Peters both reference the manor's ancient woodland and its rewilding efforts, placing it within the broader context of Shropshire's natural landscape. How to Love Animals by Henry Mance includes an account of the farm's approach to animal welfare and sustainable agriculture.

Merlin Fulcher is listed as a poet in residence.

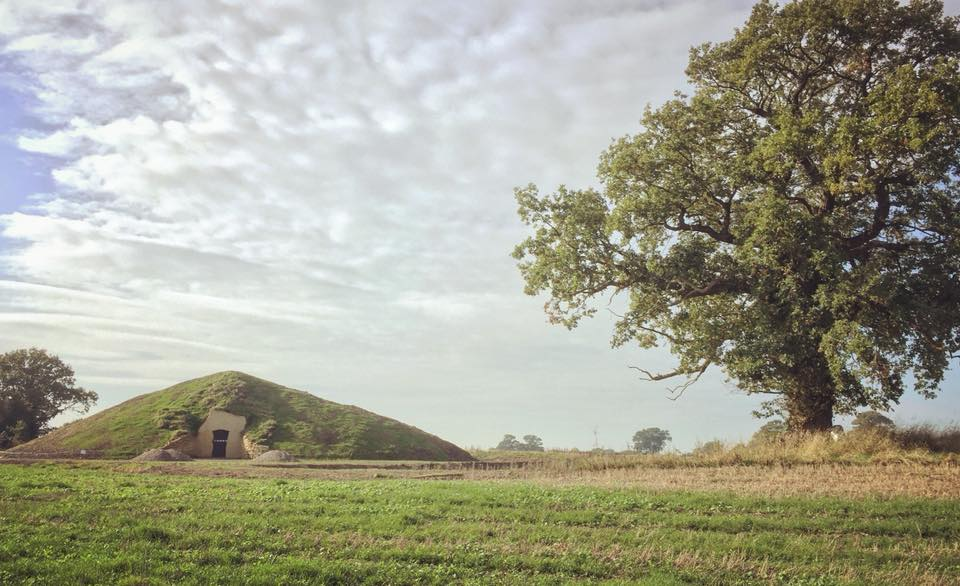
The Modern Barrow at Soulton

== Contemporary monuments ==
The estate features a series of modern monuments that contribute to a "ritual landscape" on the property.

- Soulton Long Barrow: A modern long barrow was constructed on the farmland north of the hall, beginning in 2017 and becoming operational in 2019. This new monument was featured on an episode of BBC Countryfile that same year.
- Standing Stones: Three large limestone monoliths, quarried near Peterborough, were added in 2017 to mark the access route to the barrow. In 2020, another standing stone was erected with an alignment to the setting sun on the winter solstice, dedicated to acknowledging the suffering caused by the COVID-19 pandemic.

== Historical Orthography ==
The modern spelling of 'Soulton' has evolved over time, and a wide variation can be found in historical documents. For scholarly research, it is useful to be aware of these alternative spellings, as seen in the following historical records:

- Suletune (Domesday Book, 1086)
- Suleton (Curia Regis Rolls, 1200)
- Soleton (Assize Rolls, 1271–2)
- Sulton (Feudal Aids, 1431)
- Solton (The Shropshire Lay Subsidy Roll, 1334)
- Sowton (Saxton's Map of Shropshire, 1695)
- Soughton (The Shropshire Hearth-Tax Roll, 1672)
- Saulton (Artifacts at the building, 1800s)

== See also ==
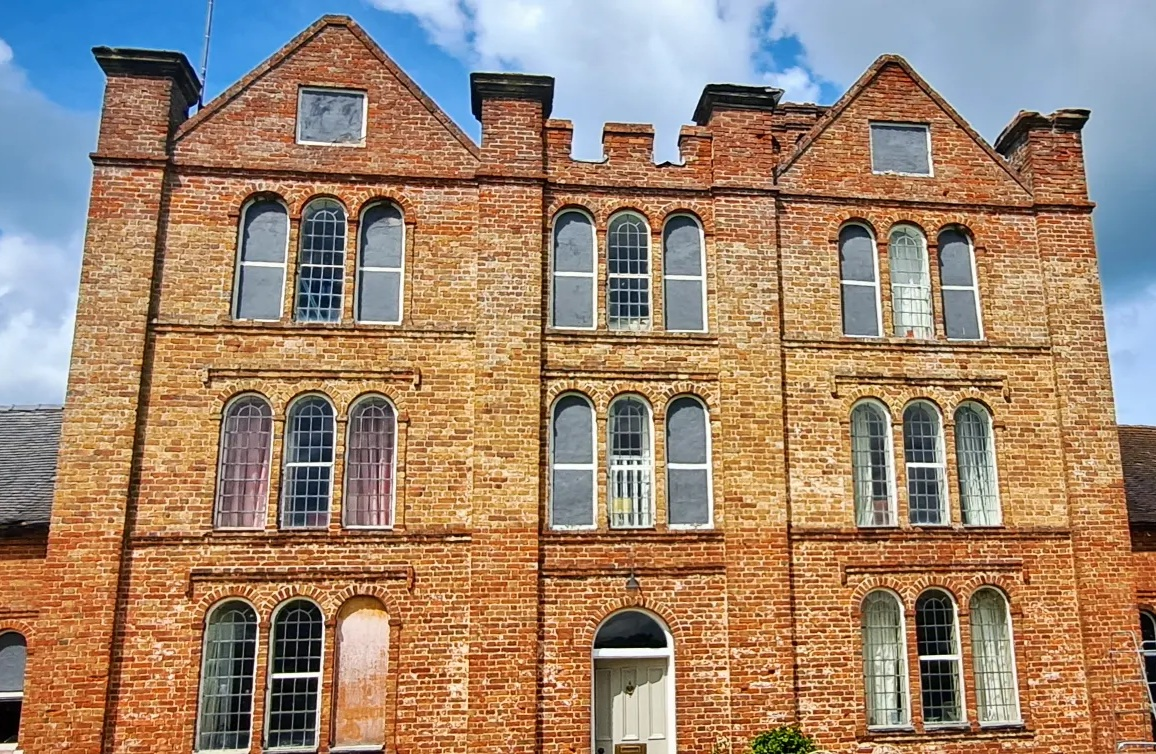
Hawkstone Abbey Farm, another Hill estates building

- Listed buildings in Wem Rural
- Hawkstone Park
- Hawkstone Hall
- National Youth Theatre
- Worshipful Company of Mercers
- Mathew Parker
- Rosewell
