= Montfode Castle =

Castle in North Ayrshire, Scotland

- Ardrossan, North Ayrshire, Scotland; UK grid reference NS2253644123
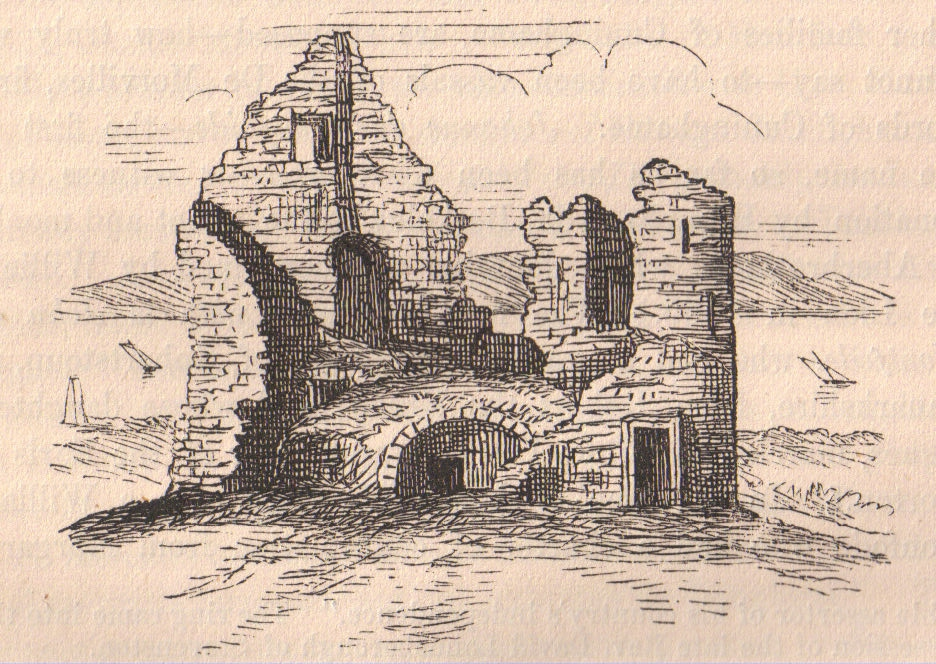
- Montfode Castle in the early 19th century

Site information
- Type: Tower house
- Owner: Private
- Controlled by: Montfode family
- Open to the public: No
- Condition: Ruined

Location
- Shown within Scotland
- Location within Scotland
- Coordinates: 55.658166°N 4.821269°W

Site history
- Built: 16th century
- Materials: Stone

The remains of the old castle of Montfode or Monfode lie to the north-west of the town of Ardrossan and 1.5 miles (2.4 km) south-west of West Kilbride in North Ayrshire, Scotland, above the Montfode Braes (above the raised beach cliffs), in the old Barony of Kilbride. The remains of the 16th-century tower are protected as a scheduled monument. The castle ruins are clearly visible from the A78 Ardrossan bypass.

== The history of Montfode Castle ==
The name 'Montfode' derives from the old Norman family of that name, the Montfodes of that Ilk. The Barony was originally held by the powerful De Morville family and the Montfodes would have been their vassals. The castle lies close to the Montfode Burn.

=== The castle ruins ===
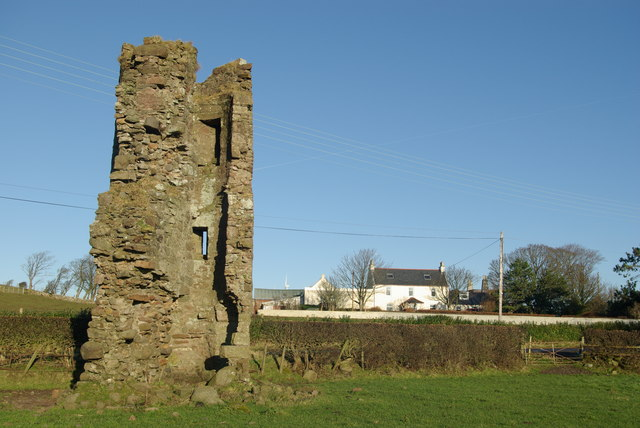
The ruins of Montfode Castle

The castle was mostly demolished in the early 19th century to provide stone to build a dam and probably buildings at Montfode Farm where the water was used to power a threshing mill. The dam and threshing mill building still exists and the mill or gathering pond site is now a wet field; the source of the water is not clear. A Mr Weir of Kirkhall made a drawing of the castle before it was robbed of stone for the dam construction and this was used by Paterson in his drawing of the castle as illustrated here. The 1769 map of the castle does not show it as a ruin and the shape is rectangular.

The remaining fragment of this baronial castle consists of a single round tower, with slits and a gun-loop, standing to around 8m with an interior diameter of 2m, originally three or four storeys high and a portion of walling about 7m high and 2m long. The doorway on the eastern side has moulded stone surround. the tower and wall are of rubble masonry and 0.7m thick. The position of this tower, situated upon an exterior angle, may indicate that the building was of a Z-plan construction. Paterson's describes the castle as having been a large oblong building. He sees the tower as having been the access to the other floors.

The 1769 map shows a replacement for the castle, Montfode House, situated at the site of the present farm. Roy's map of 1747 indicated the house with a square enclosure wall incorporating the habitation.

==== The Threshing mill ====
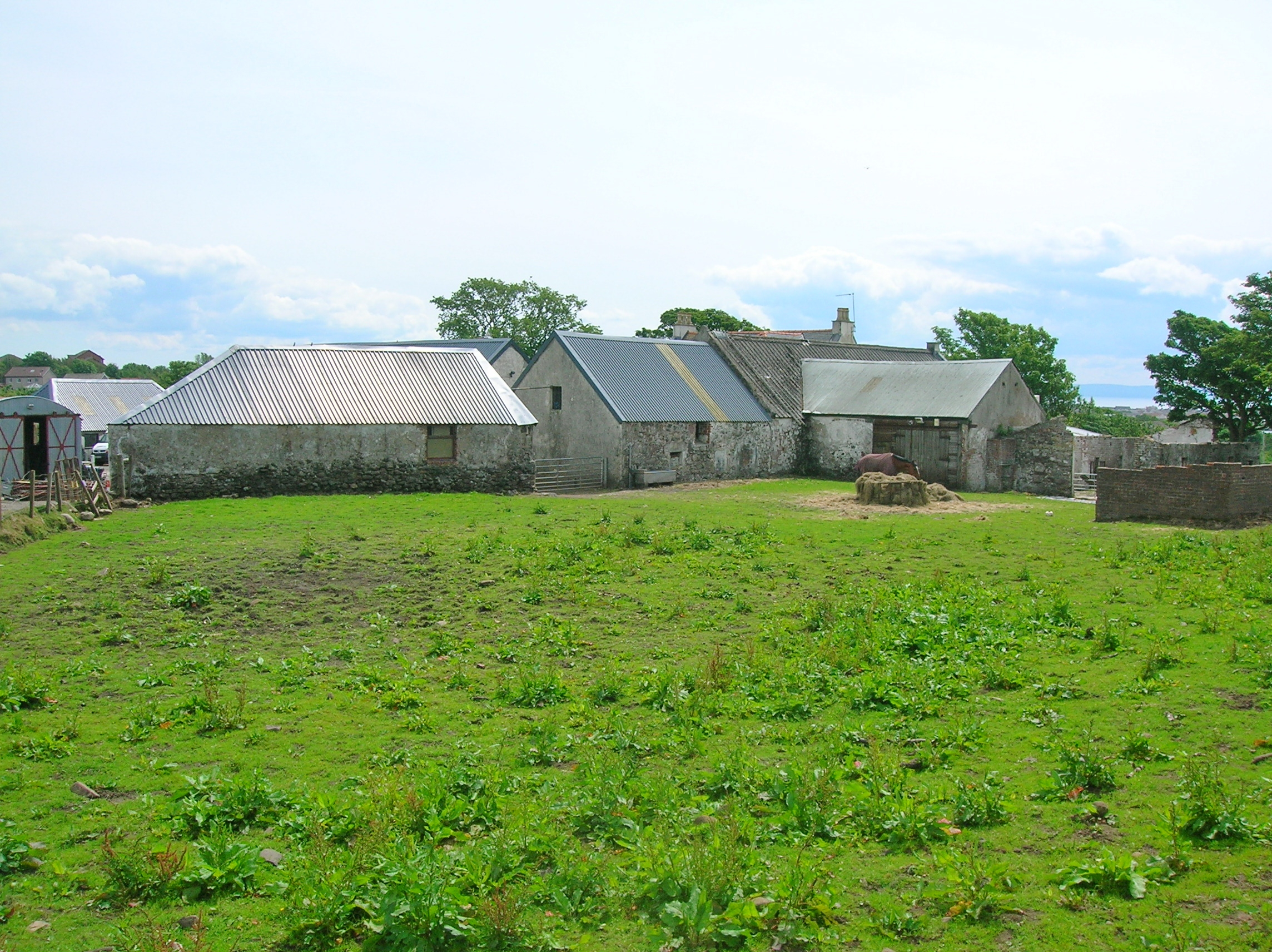
The old threshing mill and farm buildings. Hay barn to the left and mill to the right. The gathering pond occupied the half of the area to the left and the dam wall to the right has been removed.

As stated, the old castle was robbed of stone to build the dam and threshing mill in the early 19th century. Threshing is the separation of the grain of a crop from the straw. Originally by hand, the Scot Andrew Meikle of East Linton in 1786 developed a threshing machine, housed in a threshing mill. The corn was fed in at the first floor level and rollers with grid-like brushes on separated the grain from the straw. The grain passed through the grid. The grain was bagged up for the millstones, the straw taken to the straw barn. A gathering or mill pond, leats and sluices were needed. The water supply came from the hill above and remains of the control sluice are still visible, with an overflow running through a pipe to the Montfode Burn and the 'spent' water from the mill leaving via a substantial stone lined outflow that exited below the main farm buildings. A turbine may have been used as no signs of a waterwheel and associated equipment exist.

The ruins of the Montfode Cottages lie in what may have been called the Cuff Holm. The OS maps show that these typical farm workers dwellings were built in the late 19th century, possibly related to workers at the threshing mill which would have been a business serving other farms in the district.

==== Cartographic evidence ====
Robert Gordon's map of 1636–52 shows Minfod and the Minfod Burn (sic). Timothy Pont describes Montfode as "a pretty duelling beloninging to Heugh Monfodd of that ilk Laird therof." Moll records a Monfod. Roy's map of 1747 shows the castle within an enclosure with tree plantings. Armstrong's map of 1775 shows a Monfodd as a ruin. A map of the lands in 1769 shows Montfode House and castle, the house being a replacement dwelling and not a farm. Montfode Wood is recorded as a significant feature. A road is shown running directly from Montfode to Ardrossan Mill and on to Kirkhall. A wide selection of church related names are found on Armstrongs map of 1775, such as Kirklands, Kirkhill, Chapelaw and Crossmuir.

=== Montfode Mount (NS 226 437) ===
This now oval and flat topped mound lies about 500m south of the castle, sitting on the edge of the Montfode Burn that has caused some erosion, and is often taken to be the site of the original Montfode motte. Smith sees its as a burial mound, later becoming a fort, and later a court or moot hill. Indications of artificial scarping are visible and aerial photography has revealed signs of two circular ditches nearby and one around the base of the mound. The environmental remains from the site suggest a prehistoric date for all the features.

=== The estate ===
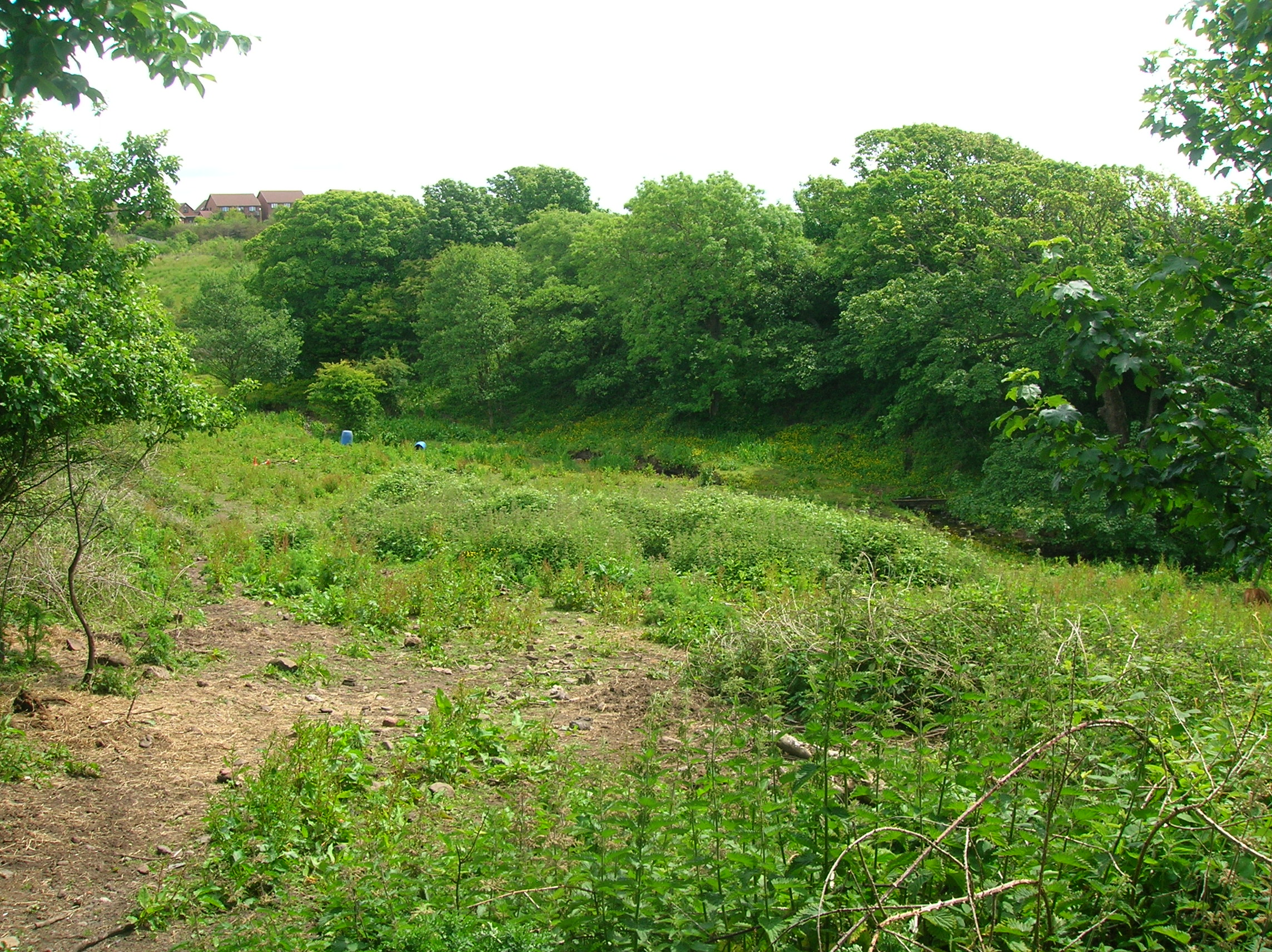
The possible Cuff Holm, site of the fight to the death between a Boyd and a Montfode in medieval times.

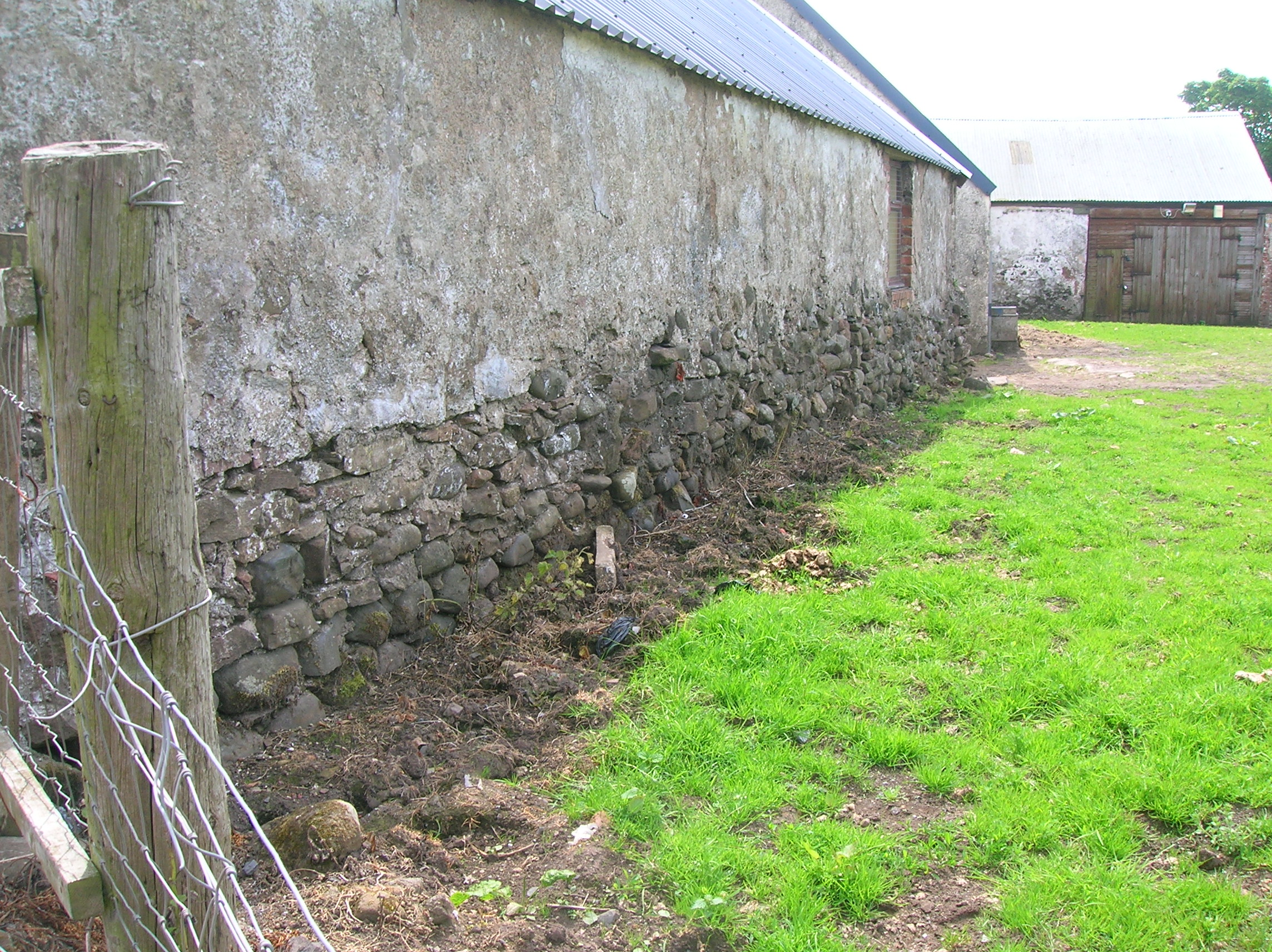
The joint dam and hay barn wall.

Boydston Farm was once known as Little Montfode, however local tradition relates that as a result of a feud one of the lairds of Montfode killed one of the Boyd family and in compensation gave the land to the Kilmarnock Boyds. The site of the murder was still well known in the 1860s, pointed out as the 'Cuff holm'. The property was recorded as a '10 merk land'.

Eddely Burn is recorded, located on the left hand of the Nodle Burn in Largs, as belonging to the Laird of Montfode. The Laird of Bishoptoun purchased lands from the laird. Langhirst near Largs was held by John and later Hugh Montfode as a "5 merk land of old extent with commonage in the common of Lairges, 31st May, 1600". In 1600 the five merk land of Gryffiscastell-Montfod is recorded and in 1619 a five merk land of Seidstoun is recorded as being possessed by the laird of Muntfod.

In 1467 King James III granted to Thomas Earl of Arran a large number of properties, including the 'Lands of Monfode'. In 1482 an 'Instrument of Sasine' was signed in favour of James, Lord Boyd at the chief messuage of Montfode at 9am.

The 1691 'Hearth Tax Rolls' record the following number of hearths associated with the estate – The House of Montfode 4; John Patersone 1; William Boyd 1; Mathew Crawford 1; Hugh Boyd, elder 1; Robert Miller 1; Hugh Boyd, younger 1; James Gililand 1; John Boyd 1; John Wood 1.

== The Trial of Mungo Campbell ==
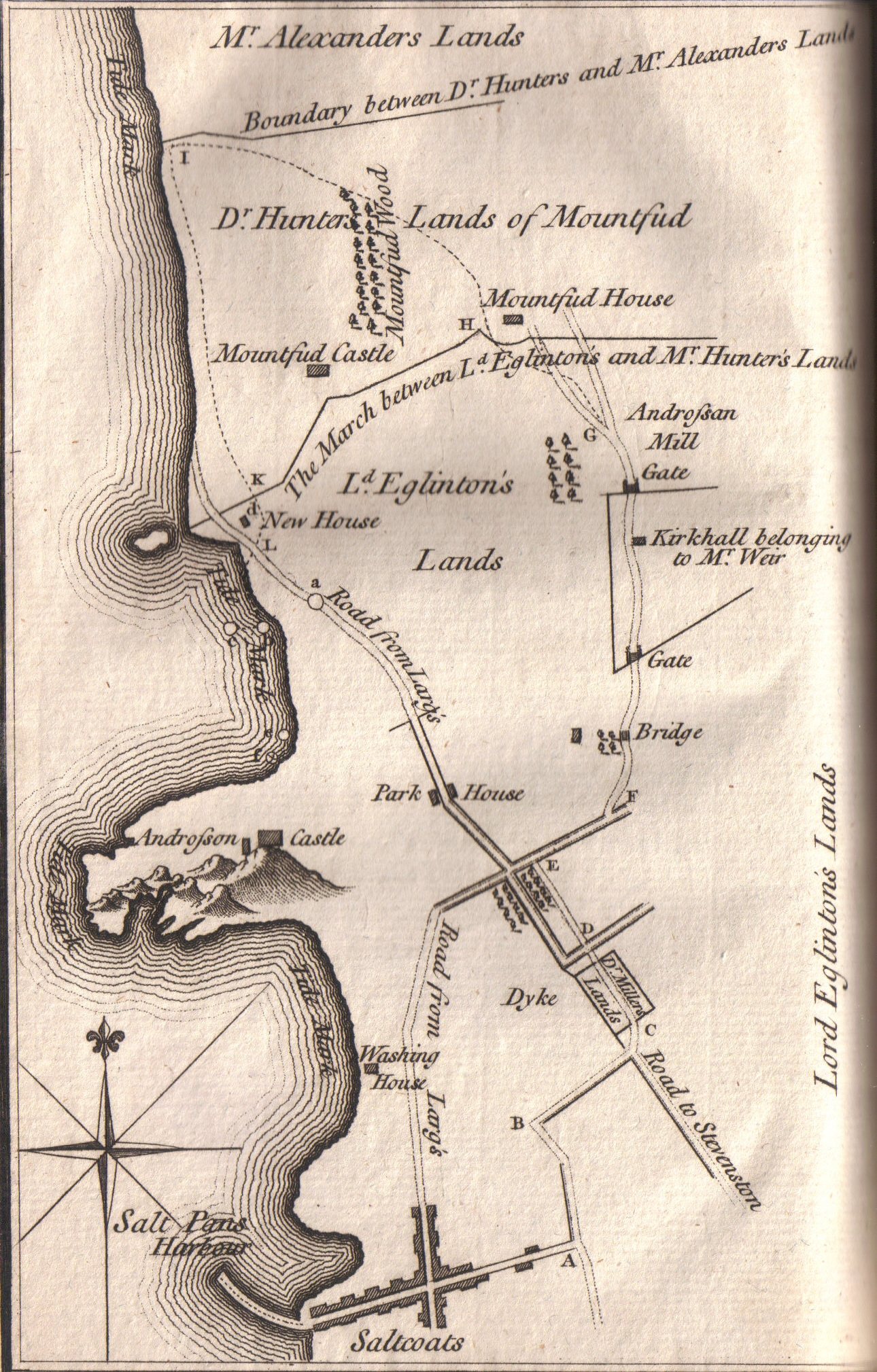
A map of the lands of Montfode in 1769.

Montfode or Mountfud as the 1769 map records it, was involved in the case of the murder of the 10th Earl of Eglinton by Mungo Campbell in 1769. John Brown, tide-officer or tide-waiter at Saltcoats gave evidence that on the day of the Earl's death, Tuesday 17 October 1769, he was walking with Mungo Campbell and "They passed through the grounds of Montfodd, and thereafter crossed a burn, which is the march between the between Montfodd and the earl of Eglintoun's property, and went through lord Eglintoun's ground towards the sea." They did not go through the fields, but went along an old kirk-road which had stiles over the dykes to allow pedestrians to pass easily.

It is clear from the 1769 map which route this kirk or church-road followed northwards from Montfode, from the south Mungo the route ran through lands owned by a Dr. Miller and Mr. Weir of Kirkhall. Mungo had permission from Dr. Hunter to shoot on the lands of Montfode, as well as preserve game and prosecute poachers. On this day they were hunting for woodcock in the glen of the Montfode Burn and after crossing the Montfode Burn they walked briefly through the Earl of Eglinton's property before reaching the beach. Mungo Campbell was accused by Alexander, 10th Earl of Eglinton of poaching on his land and the result of this incident was the death of the earl from a gunshot wound as a result of Mungo Campbell firing into his bowels.

== Associated families ==
=== The Montfode lairds ===
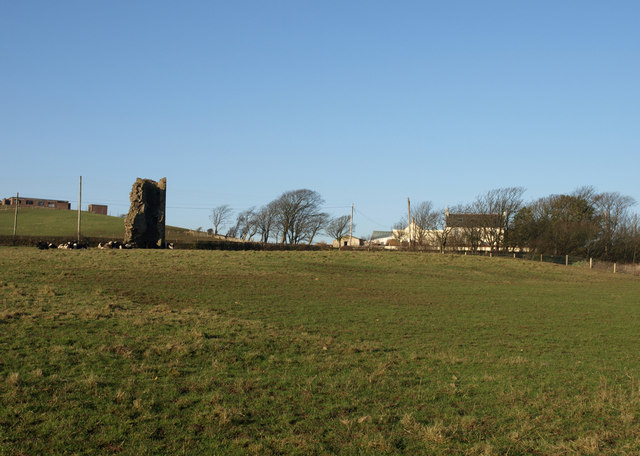
The castle ruins and Montfode Farm.

A Norman family, the name has many spellings, such as Monfode, Muntfod, Monfood, Monfodd, Monfoit, Monfoid, Montfoyd, etc. In 1417 Finlam de Monfode de eodeum ('of that place') is recorded as being a member of a jury of fifteen who decided upon an action between the Royal Burgh of Irvine and William Frances of Stanecastle. In 1509 John Montfode is heir and acted as a witness in conjunction with William, Abbot of Kilwinning.

In 1511 John Montfode, younger of that Ilk, together with Hugh, Earl of Eglinton, and several others acted together against John Scot, a Burgess of Irvine. They came to his house, assaulted his wife, striking her and pulling out much of her hair, taking the burgess to the tolbooth as a thief, imprisoning him for six hours, possibly at Montfode, and then putting him in the stocks.

In 1526 James Montfode (probably brother to John) was accused of taking part, together with the Earl of Eglinton and others, of murdering the Laird of Auchinharvie. James Montfode of that Ilk was killed at the Battle of Pinkie on 10 September 1547. A John Montfode is recorded in 1547 and in 1568 he was one of several Ayrshire barons who protested to the parliament in Edinburgh against the loss of their lands as a result of the Earl of Eglintons sentence for high treason as a result of his support of Mary Queen of Scots at the Battle of Langside. Hugh succeeded him in 1600 and married Jean Boyd of the Portencross family. Hugh Montfode had succeeded his father by 1621 and had three children, William, Margaret and Janet. William's heir was John Montfode of that Ilk, the last of the line. Margaret, his sister-german had died without any children and William was her heir.

The family became extinct in the 17th century, after five centuries of prominence in the locality. Janet Montfode married Archibald Steel in Corsmoor, Kilbride parish, being therefore the only line who can claim a link with the Montfodes of that Ilk.

==== Coat of arms ====
Coat of arms of Simon de Montfort

It is suggested that the arms were the same as those of the Monfort family, namely; gules, a lion rampant queue fourchée argent. In the ancient burial ground of Ardrossan, in sight of the ruins of old Montfode castle, is a tombstone that local tradition links with the family of Montfode of that Ilk. It carries the figure of an 'armed man' and a carved shield bears a very worn image of an animal in rampant pose. Another view is that this is the grave of Sir Fergus de Barclay.

=== Craufurd and Miller ===
A Robert Craufurd in Montfode is recorded in 1621 as spouse to Margaret Lambie. Hugh Montfode of that Ilk's sister Jean was married to John Miller of Chapelton in the parish of Kilbryde, who died in 1622; they had a son Hugh Miller. Jean Montfode nominated John Miller to be her executor. A link also existed with the Miller family of Laigh Chapelton near Stewarton. The American genealogist Steve Miller has revealed that in 1828 the recently deceased and bankrupt John Miller of Chapeltoun, was through his son James, then living at Montfode House, being sued by Col Charles S. McAlister of Kennox.

=== The Montgomeries ===
Montfode seems to have been held by the Earl of Eglinton briefly in 1661 before passing to William Brisbane by 1682. The record states an annual payment to the Earl of Eglinton as "una petra albae cerae de terris de Montfode" or "One stone of white wax from the lands of Montfode".

=== The Brisbanes, Ramsays and Hunters ===
In 1682 the estate was held by William Brisbane, druggist and surgeon in Ayr. William was Provost of Ayr in 1684 and was a leading advocate of the Presbyterian cause. Two people with the name Montfode appear as druggists in Ayr and some therefore employment arrangements may have been made with the former proprietors. Dr William Ramsay, a commissioner of supply subsequently obtained the lands in 1714. In 1769 a Dr. Hunter is given as owner of the lands, with a Mr. Alexander of Boydston owning the lands to the north-west, the boundary being the burn near Crawford's Lodge.

=== The Carricks and Moores ===
Robert Carrick, a Glasgow banker, purchased the lands and in 1821 he was succeeded by James Moore, who took the name Carrick. General Sir John Moore of Corunna fame was the brother of this James Carrick Moore. James died in 1860 and the estate passed to his son John Carrick Moore of Corswell and Monfode who married Caroline Bradley. John Graham Moore, a lieutenant, was their son.

== The Kilbirnie Seer ==
John Cameron relates a tale about the last on the Montfodes in which Sir Hugh Montfode adopts Emma Crawfurd, his niece, as his sole heir. Her mother was a Montfode and her father died fighting for King Charles I under the banner of Montrose. She falls in love with Richard Hunter of Hunterston who returns from abroad a rich man; however, all of his wealth is lost in a shipwreck almost in sight of the shores of Scotland.

The Montfode prophecy

When a fatherless child, and a childless father,
Shall live in love and sorrow together;
When the houlet shall big in the auld tower wa',
And the oak its green leaves shed in the ha';

When a rose tree shall blossom on Emmeline's Walk,
With only one lonely flower on its stalk;
When a hameless wanderer shall come frae abroad,
And thowless trust in the house of Montfode;

When the water is dry in St. Winning's well,
And there is not a monk the cause to tell;
When a sparrow shall chase frae its eyrie the hawk,
And the cock, at gloamin', craw thrice on the bauk;

When the locusts shall eat up the corn in the ear,
The end of the house of Montfode is near.

Sir Hugh Montfode at first refuses to accept Richard as a husband for his niece; however, after Richard rescues Emma from kidnappers he subsequently is reconciled to him and the couple marry. Emma, however, dies young and childless, her grave recorded as being an old grey slab, otherwise with illegible inscriptions but bearing the date 1661 and situated in the parish churchyard of Ardrossan.

== Views of Montfode Farm and Threshing Mill ==
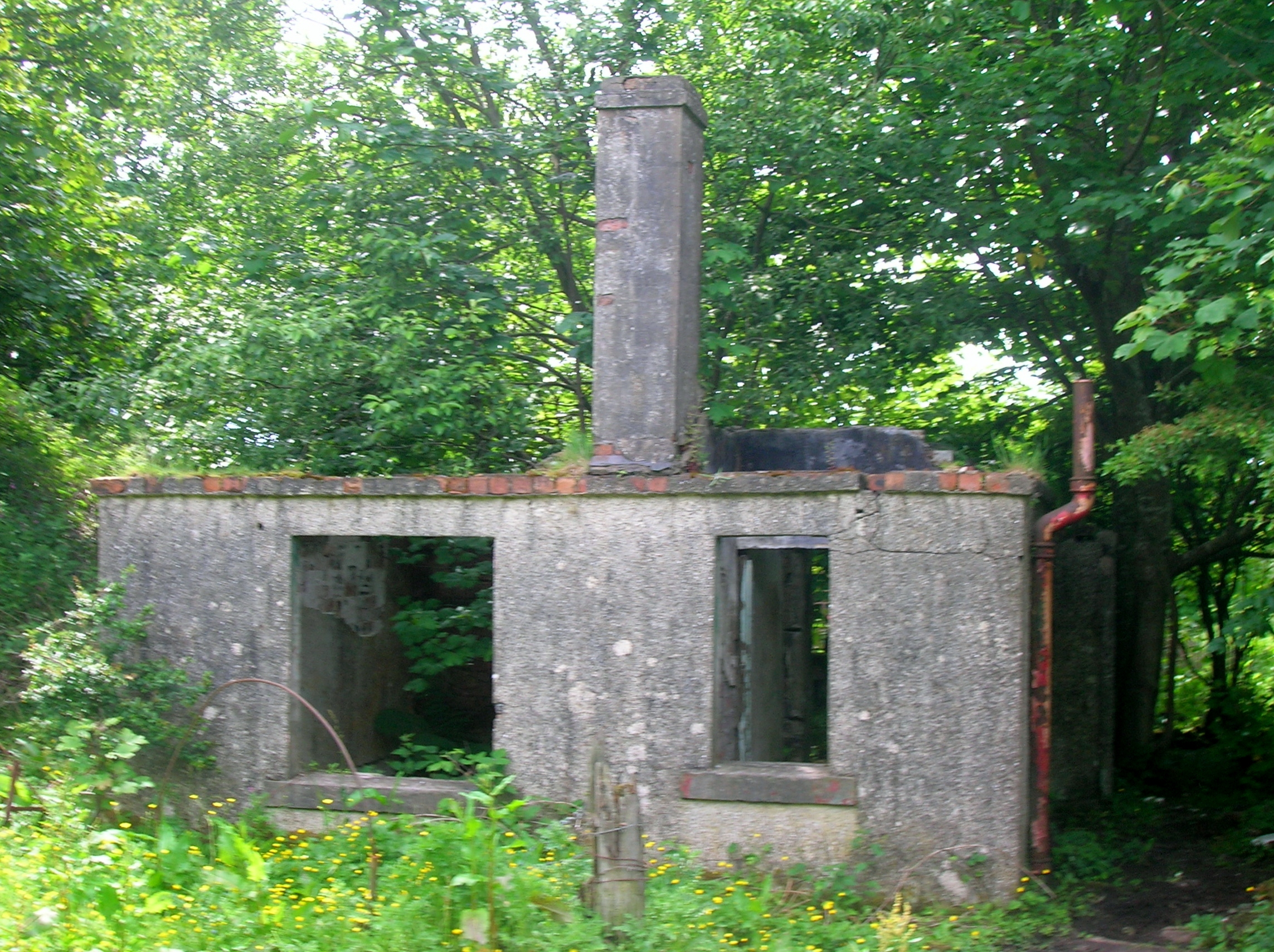
Ruins of the Montfode Cottages.

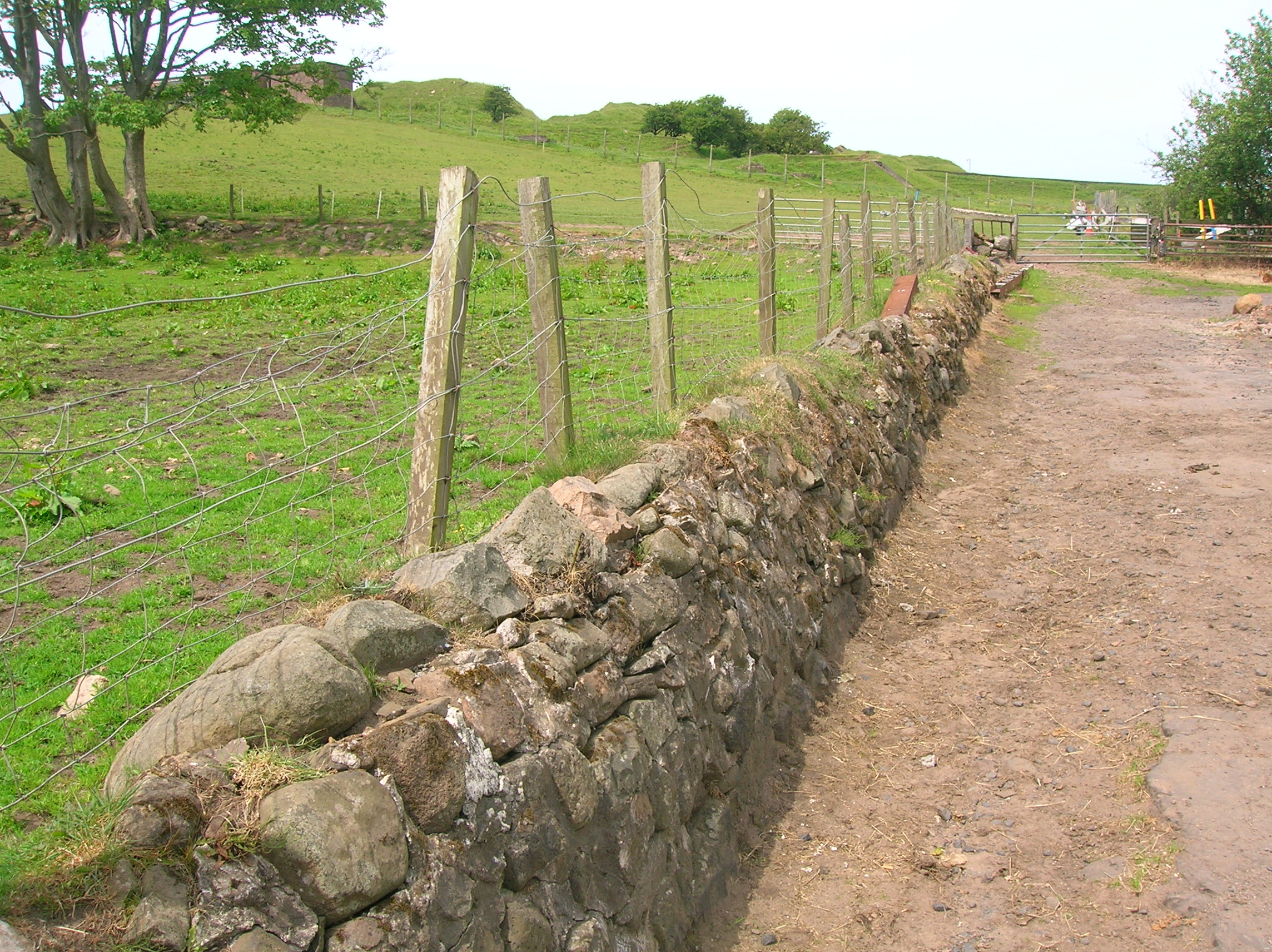
Old dam wall constructed from the old castle stones. The dam wall on the other side has been removed.

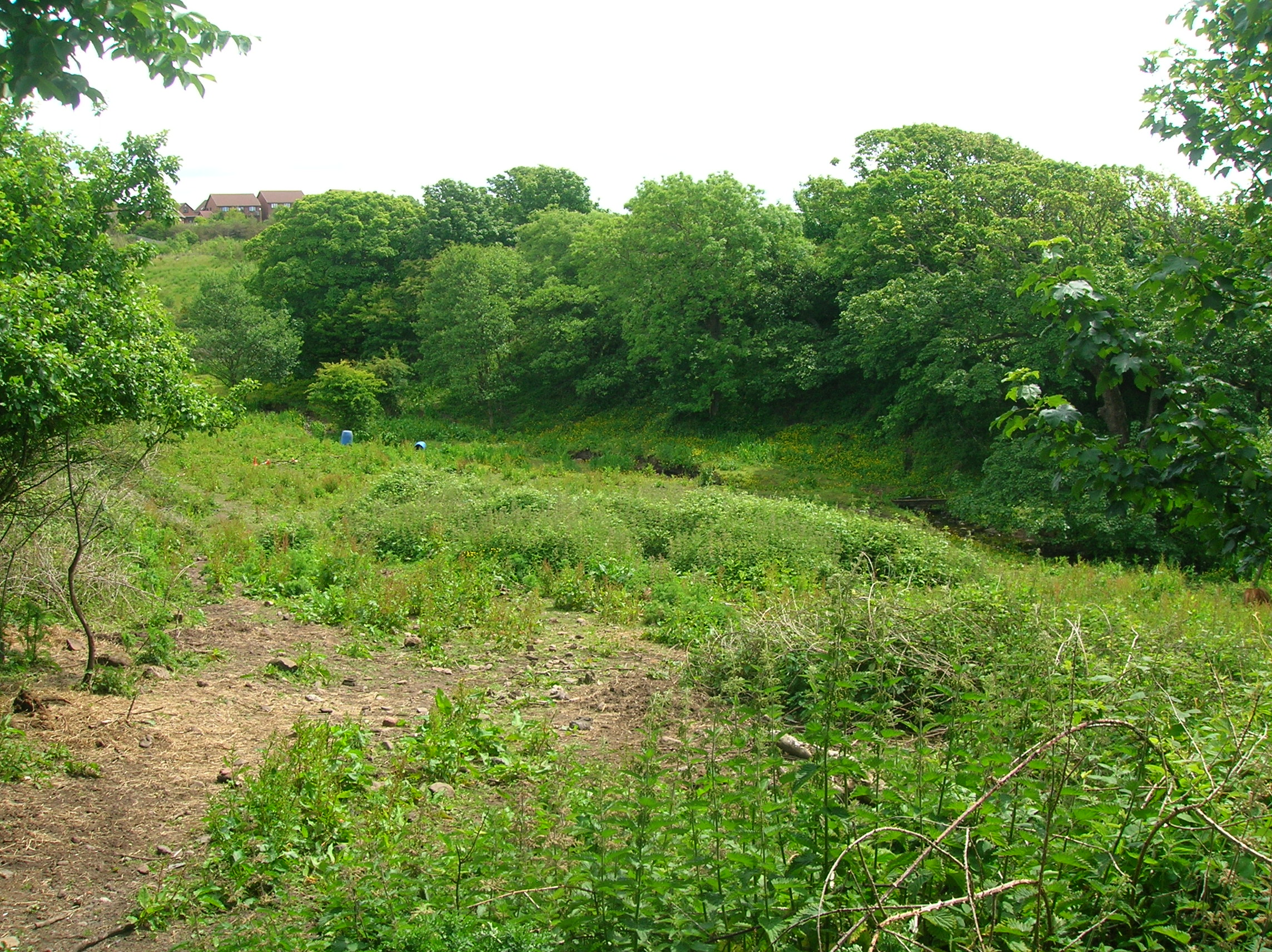
Cuff Holm - site of the murder of a Boyd by a Montfode.

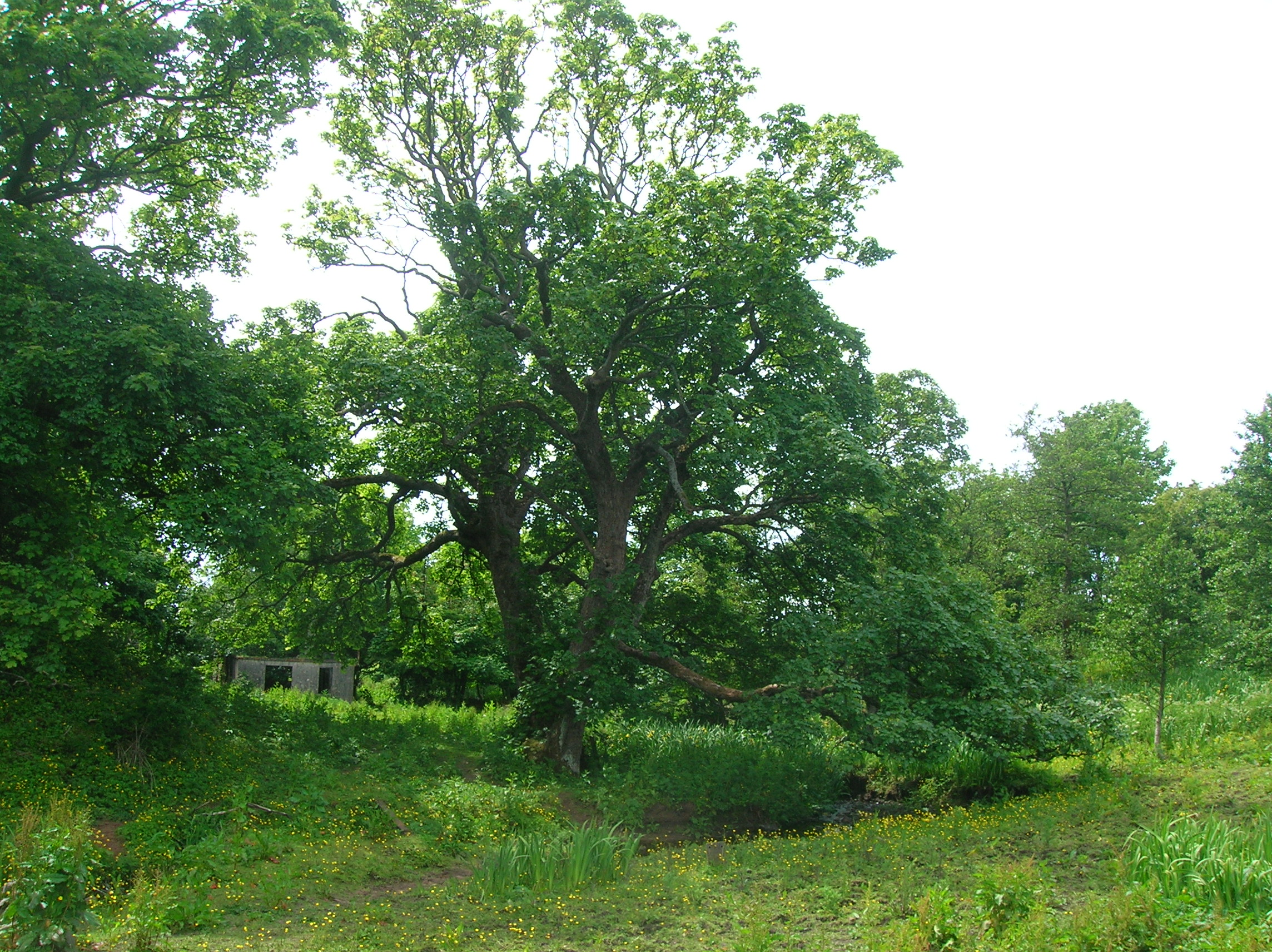
Ancient Sycamore and Montfode Cottages.

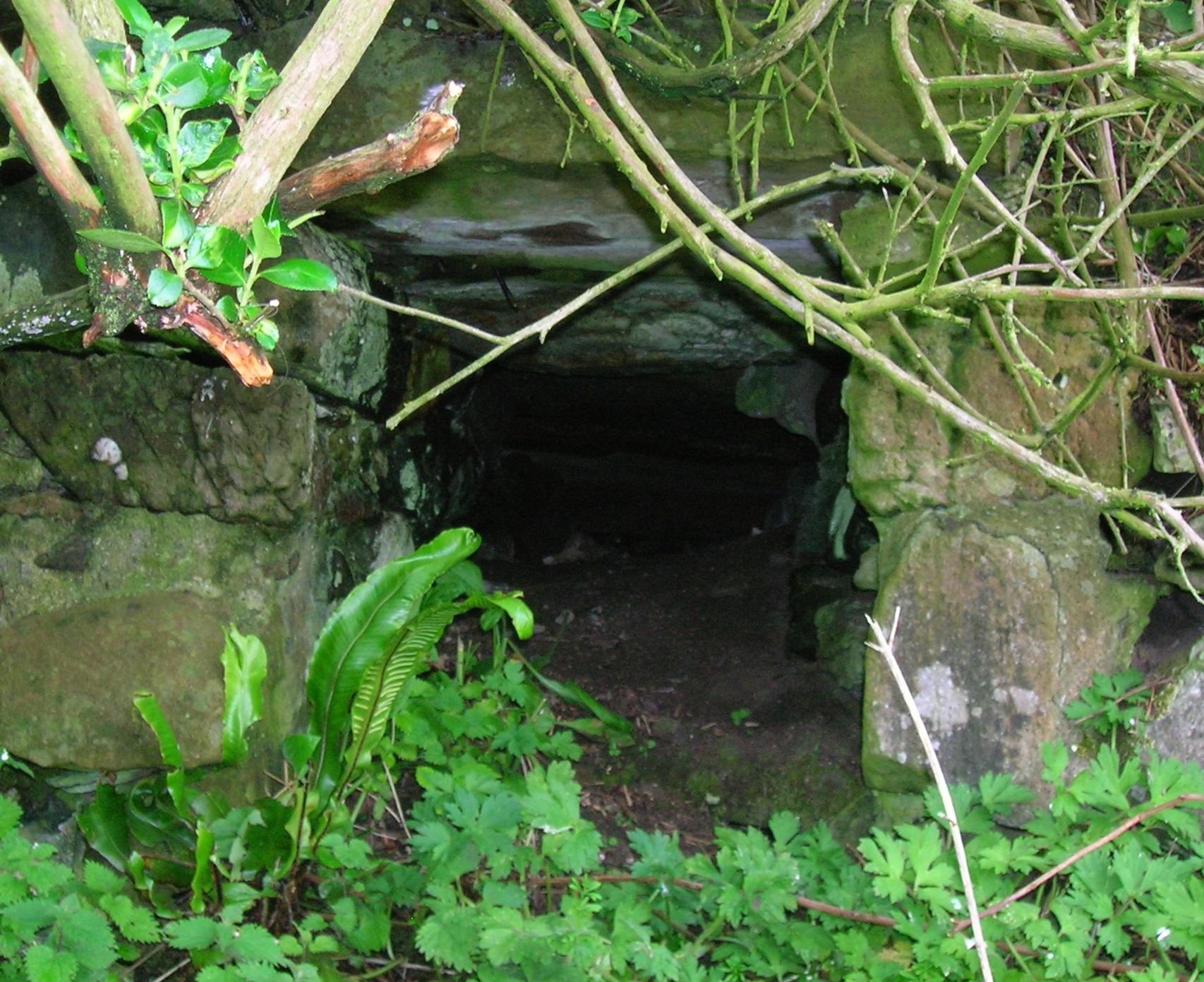
Stone lined outflow tunnel from Montfode House.

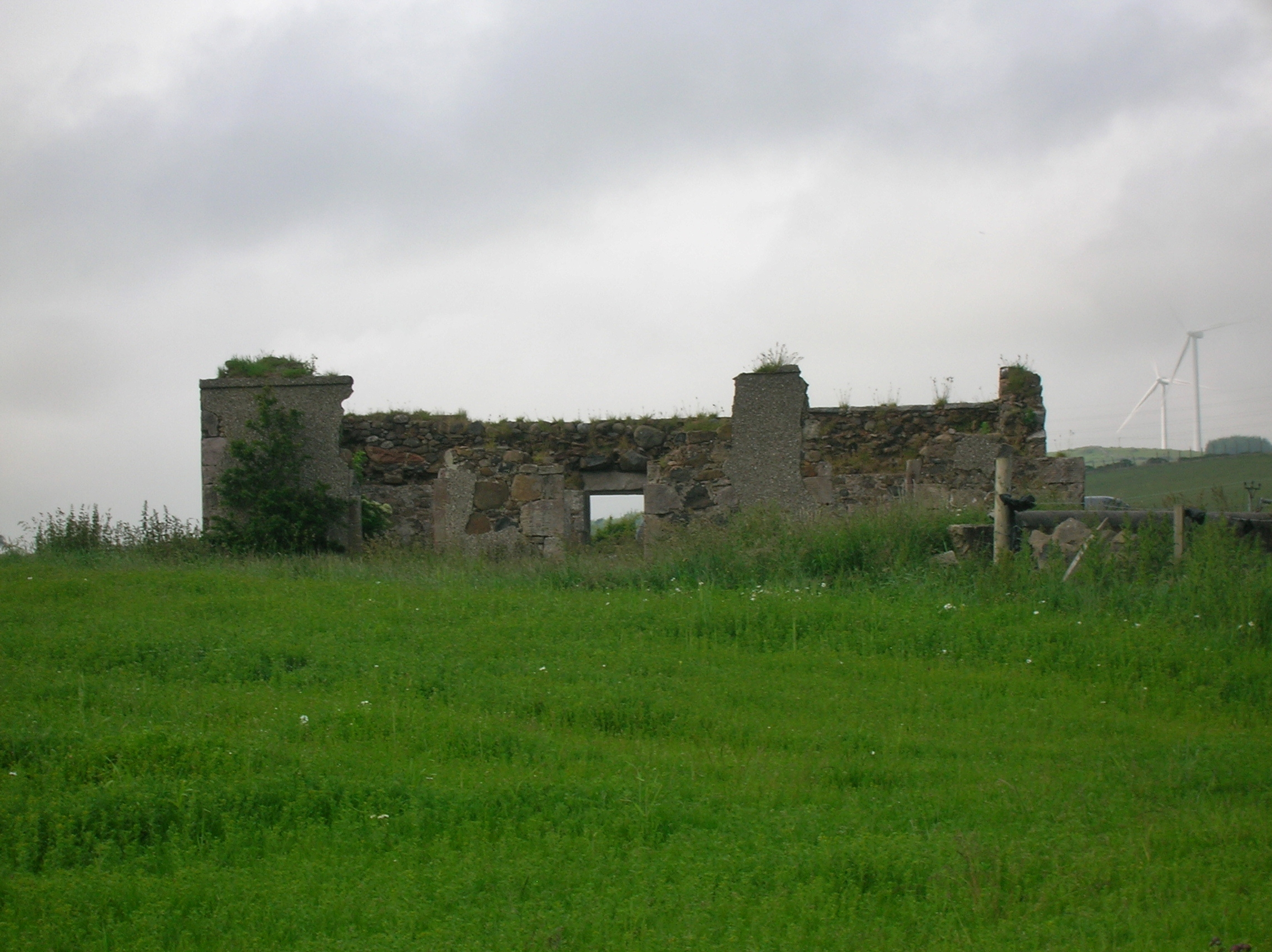
Townhead of Montfode, farm ruins.

== Archaeological notes ==
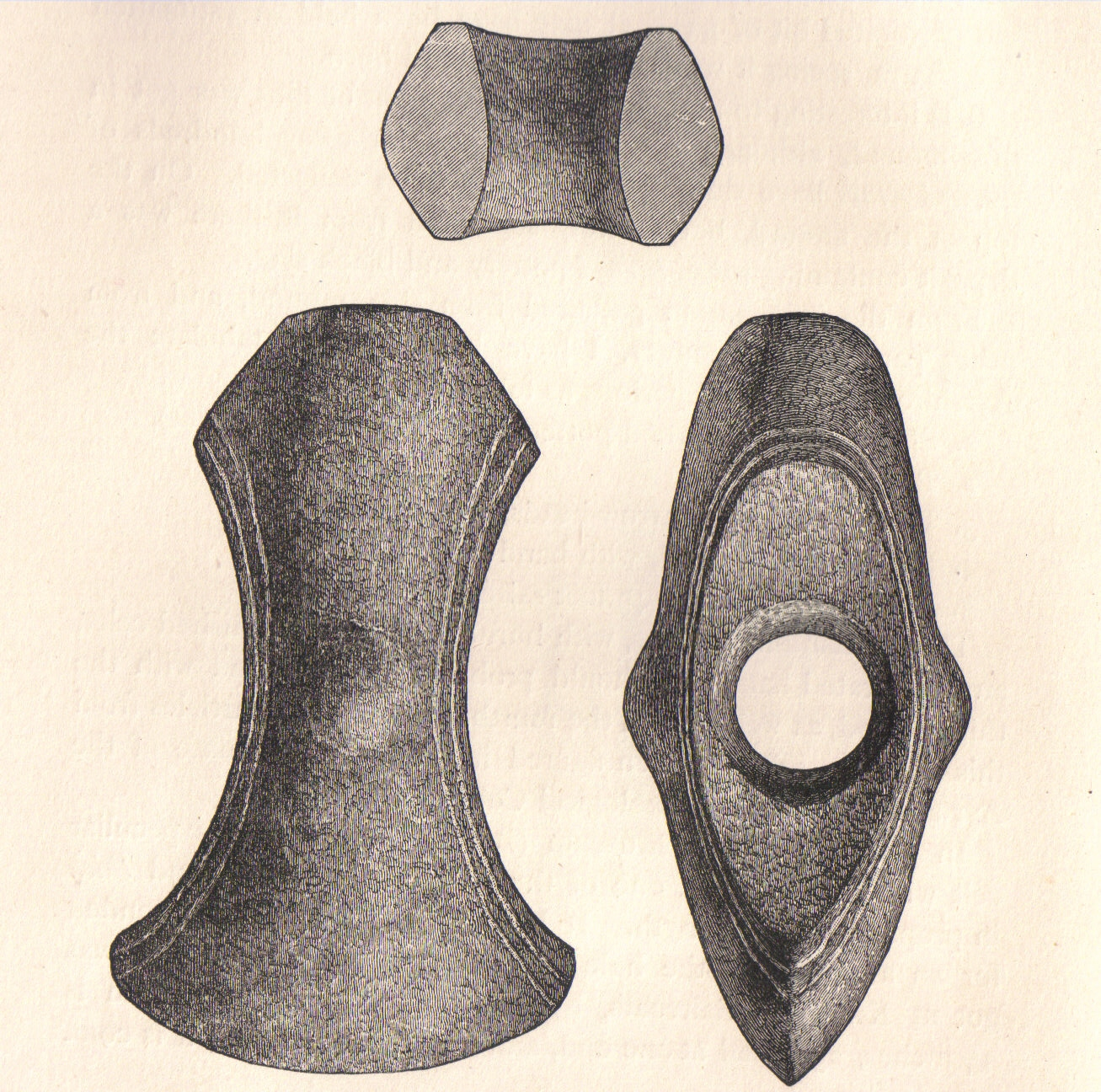
A stone axe hammer from near Montfode

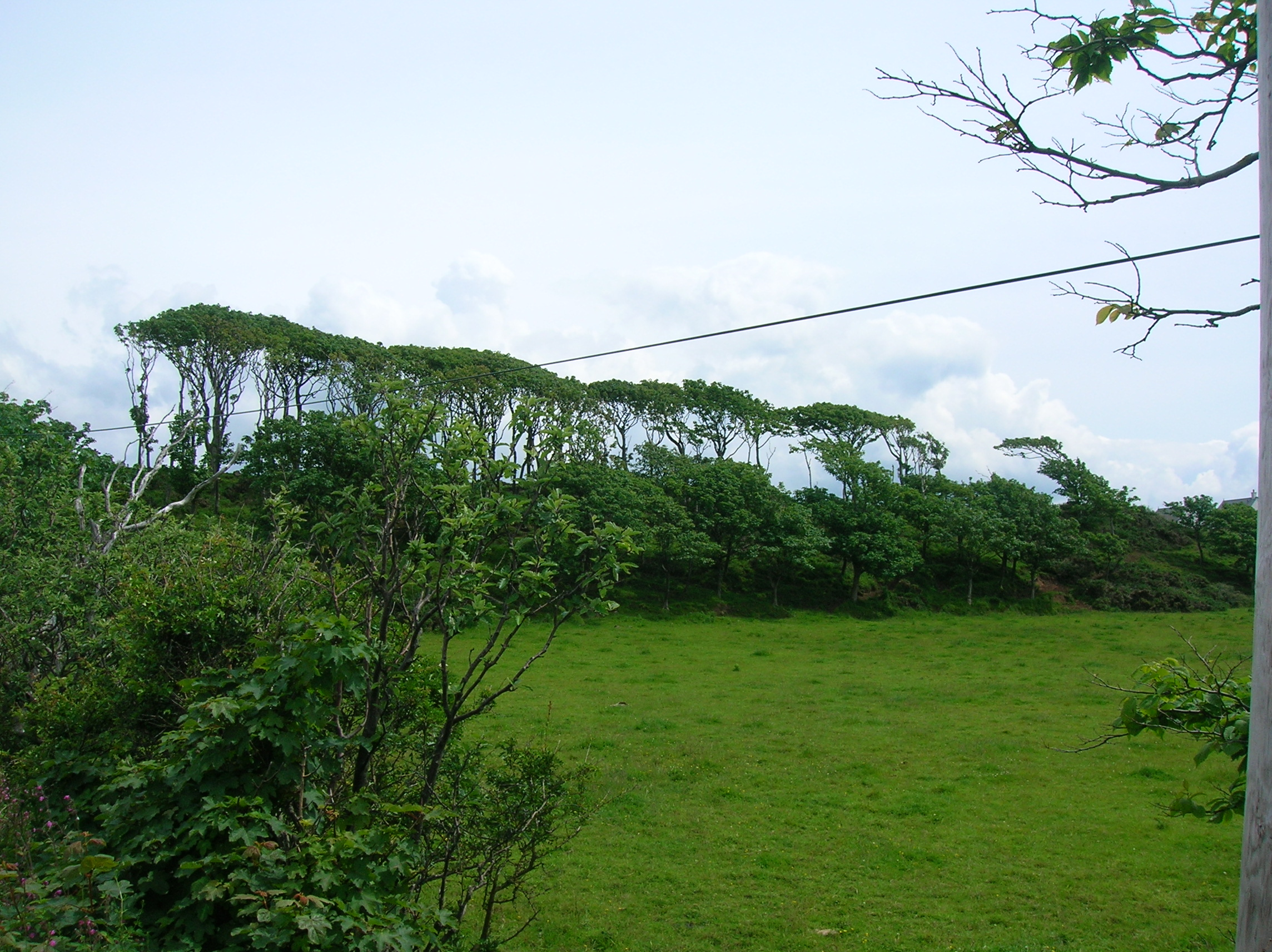
Montfode Braes

A battle axe was ploughed up in 1864 on top of Montfode Braes (name NS 224 439) near the remains of several ancient forts. It is of grey stone, with a small boss on either side, and is 4.6 inches long.

In 1965, a thumbnail scraper of yellow-brown flint was picked up in a ploughed field above Montfode Braes. It was retained by the finder.

In 2002, at NS 228 441 an enclosure or cemetery was revealed at a previously unknown semi-circular enclosure with 60 cist and earth graves. The graves were concentrated in the south-east of the site near an entrance in the enclosure ditch.

A group of five buried storage tanks associated with the old Shell-Mex petrol refinery at Ardrossan were located just north of Montfode Castle. The whole depot area has been surrounded by a perimeter fence and there are several buildings surviving. The depot has a rail connection on the west side.

Five connected fish trap boulder alignments having a combined length of some 200 metres are located at the mouth of the Montfode Burn. The boulders rest on the beach in association with rock outcrops.

== Smuggling ==
John Brown and the exciseman, Mungo Campbell, were familiar with the foot of the Montfode Burn as being a "common haunt of smugglers" and the neck of marshy ground near Newhouse (now Burnhouse) as being a well known hiding place for smuggled goods.

== Micro-history ==
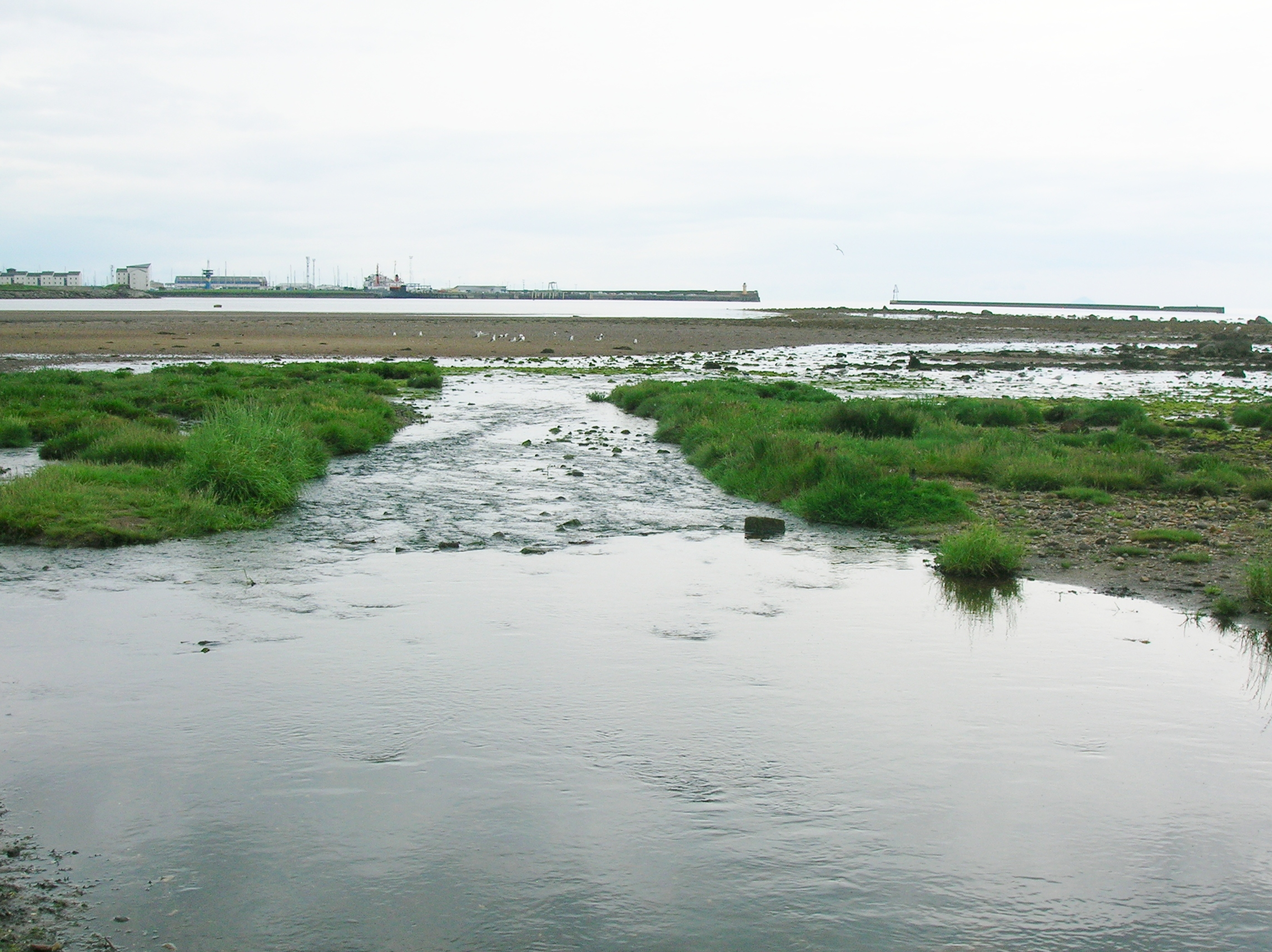
The outflow of the Montfode Burns into Ardrossan North Bay. The burn was the boundary of the old estate lands.

William Montfode was recorded as being overseer to the children of Alexander of Cuninghame of Collellane in 1660. John Montfode, the last of that Ilk, was a commissioner of supply and also was appointed to the commission of inquiry into the state of the Scottish church in 1662.

A James Montfoid in Saltcoats was subject to an 'Act of Deprivation of non-resident Burgesses of Irvine' in 1595. Dr John de Monfode is recorded in Robertson's index of charters as holding the lands of Braidwood in Lanarkshire.

Montfode Castle is said to be linked with Ardrossan Castle by a ley tunnel.

A Chapelhill lies just to the east of Montfode Castle and a tumulus once sat on the crest of Knockrivoch Mount, again lying to the east.

A horse gin was housed in a circular building that was attached to western side of Montfode Farm.

The entrance lane at the old raised beach has an unusual planting in the hedgerow of several common whitebeam x wild service tree hybrids.
