= Harriet Moore =

Harriet Moore may refer to:

- Harriet Bowell, wife of former Canadian prime minister Mackenzie Bowell
- Harriet Jane Moore, British watercolorist
