= John Ireland (writer) =

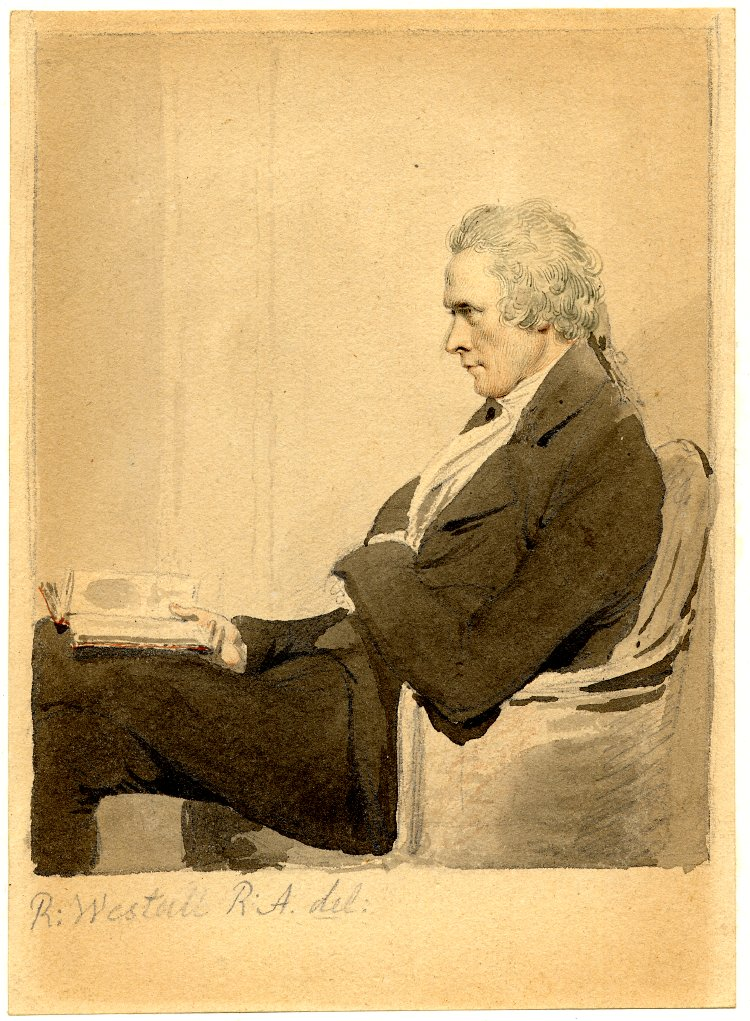
- Portrait by Richard Westall
- Died: November 1808

John Ireland (died November 1808) was a British writer.

He was born at the Trench Farm, near Wem in Shropshire; the house had been the birthplace and country house of William Wycherley, whose widow is said to have adopted him, but, dying without a will, to have left him unprovided for. His mother was daughter of the Rev. Thomas Holland, and granddaughter of Philip Henry. Ireland was first apprenticed to Isaac Wood, a watchmaker, of Shrewsbury. He afterwards practised as a watchmaker in Maiden Lane, London, and was a well-known member of the society that frequented the Three Feathers coffee-house, Leicester Fields. He published in 1785 a poem, The Emigrant, for which he apologised on the score of youth. He was a friend of John Henderson the actor, and in 1786 published Henderson's Letters and Poems, with Anecdotes of his Life, a book of some merit.

Ireland was a great admirer and collector of the works of William Hogarth. In 1793 he was employed by John Boydell to edit a work on the lines of John Trusler's Hogarth Moralised, and called Hogarth Illustrated. The first two volumes were published in 1791, and reprinted in 1793 and 1806. Subsequently Ireland obtained from Mrs. Lewis, the executrix of Mrs. Hogarth, a number of manuscripts and sketches which had belonged to Hogarth, including the original manuscript of The Analysis of Beauty, and many autobiographical memoranda and sketches prepared by Hogarth himself in view of the publication of A History of the Arts. From this Ireland compiled a biography of the artist, which has been the foundation of all subsequent memoirs. It was published in 1798 as a supplementary volume to his Hogarth Illustrated, with Engravings from some hitherto unpublished Drawings. A second edition of the Supplement appeared in 1804; the whole work was reprinted in 1812. Ireland died in Birmingham in November 1808.

His collection was sold by auction on 5 and 6 March 1810. A portrait of Ireland was engraved by Isaac Mills from a drawing by J. R. Smith, which was afterwards in the collection of John Bowyer Nichols. Another portrait, drawn by his friend J. H. Mortimer, was engraved by William Skelton for his Hogarth Illustrated; a copy of this by T. Tagg appeared in the later reprints. A portrait of him, drawn by Richard Westall, is in the print room at the British Museum, where there is also a small drawing of him prefixed to a copy of the sale catalogue of his collection. He is sometimes stated to have been a print-seller, but, if this was the case, he does not appear to have concerned himself with other engravings than those by or after Hogarth.
