= John Carrick Moore =

British geologist (1805–1898)

John Carrick Moore FGS, FRS
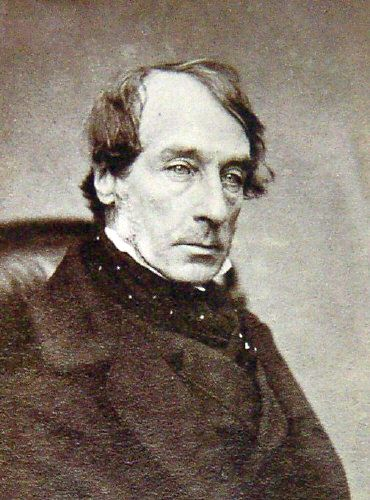
- John Carrick Moore
- Born: 14 February 1805
- Died: 12 February 1898 (aged 92); 113 Eaton Square, London
- Resting place: Kensal Green Cemetery
- Education: Westminster School; University of Glasgow
- Alma mater: Queens' College, Cambridge
- Spouse: Caroline Bradley
- Children: Mary; John Graham
- Scientific career
- Fields: Geology

John Carrick Moore (1805–1898) FGS, FRS was an eminent geologist and the "last of that band of ardent field-geologists who … did so much to investigate the underground structure of the British Islands". He was also Deputy Lieutenant of the county of Wigtown.

== Biography ==
John Carrick Moore was the son of James Carrick Moore and Harriet Henderson, daughter of the actor John Henderson. He was born on 14 February 1805. He was admitted to Westminster School on 18 September 1815. Then, after a period at Glasgow University (1820-23) Moore entered Queens' College, Cambridge in 1823, where he was awarded the degree of M.A. In 1827 he was fourteenth Wrangler in the mathematical tripos.

Moore was admitted to the Inner Temple on 29 January 1824 and called to the Bar on 28 January 1831. But he had a greater interest in geology than in the law. In the mid-1830s he became interested in the Rhinns of Wigtownshire, near his home. He was in touch with Charles Lyell (later Sir Charles Lyell, 1st Baronet, FRS), who identified the fossils found by him as graptolites. Moore was elected a Fellow of the Geological Society in 1838. He was appointed Secretary from 1846 to 1852, elected a Vice-President (1853—4), and then resumed as Secretary in 1855 for one year. Moore presented to the Society accounts of further research, and published papers in 1850 and 1863.

In 1853 Moore was elected a Visitor and then in 1857 a Manager of the Royal Institution. He was appointed Deputy Lieutenant of the county of Wigtown (now part of Dumfries and Galloway) on 20 November 1854.

At some point - it is not clear when - Moore was awarded a share of the compensation for the Morant estate in St Thomas-in-the-East in Jamaica.

In November 1855 John Carrick Moore was proposed as a Fellow of the Royal Society, his nomination paper being signed first by his friend Charles Lyell; others who subscribed included Adam Sedgwick, Roderick Murchison, Leonard Horner and Michael Faraday. He was elected on 5 June 1856.

On 27 February 1875 Moore was one of the pallbearers at the funeral of his friend Sir Charles Lyell, who was laid to rest in the nave of Westminster Abbey. That same year Moore withdrew from the Council of the Geological Society and took no further active part in scientific work. He spent his remaining years between his seat in Wigtownshire and the house in Eaton Square. In 1888 he published for private circulation Recollections of an Octogenarian.

== Family ==
John Carrick Moore married Caroline Bradley at St James Westminster On 12 February 1835. They had two children:

- Mary, born on 2 September 1837 at Hagley , Worcestershire. She died unmarried on 28 January 1925 at Brook Farm, Cobham, Surrey, aged 87. She stated in her will that she desired to be buried in the same grave as her father at Kensal Green Cemetery. Her estate was valued at almost £166,000.
- John Graham, born on 25 September 1845 at Hertford Street, Mayfair. He was a lieutenant in the Royal Horse Guards, and married Florence Mary Wills-Sandford on 8 February 1872 at St Mary’s, Compton Pauncefoot. They had no children. He died on 10 July 1890, aged 44. Florence died in 1911 and was buried at Hastings cemetery on 6 April 1991

Caroline Moore – who had been presented to the Queen at St James’s Palace on 2 May 1855 by Viscountess Dalrymple, and who had done the same for her daughter on 29 April 1856 – died on 27 December 1876 at 113 Eaton Square.

John Carrick Moore died at Eaton Square on 12 February 1898, two days before his 93rd birthday, leaving an estate valued at over £146,000. He was survived by his daughter.
