= John Moore (Scottish physician) =

Scottish physician and writer (1729–1802)

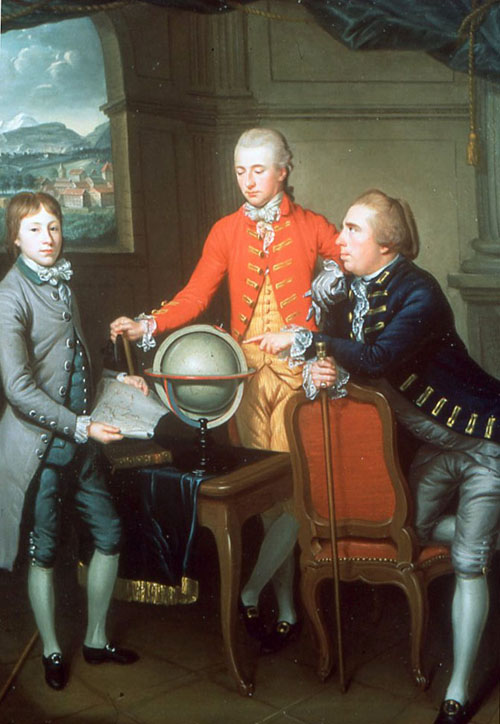
- Portrait of Douglas, 8th Duke of Hamilton, on his Grand Tour with his physician Dr. John Moore and the latter's son John. A view of Geneva is in the distance where they stayed for two years. Painted by Jean Preudhomme in 1774.
- Born: 1729; Stirling, Scotland
- Died: 21 January 1802 (aged 72–73); London, England
- Occupations: Physician, author
- Children: General Sir John Moore; Admiral Sir Graham Moore; Dr. James Moore; James Carrick Moore; Jane Moore

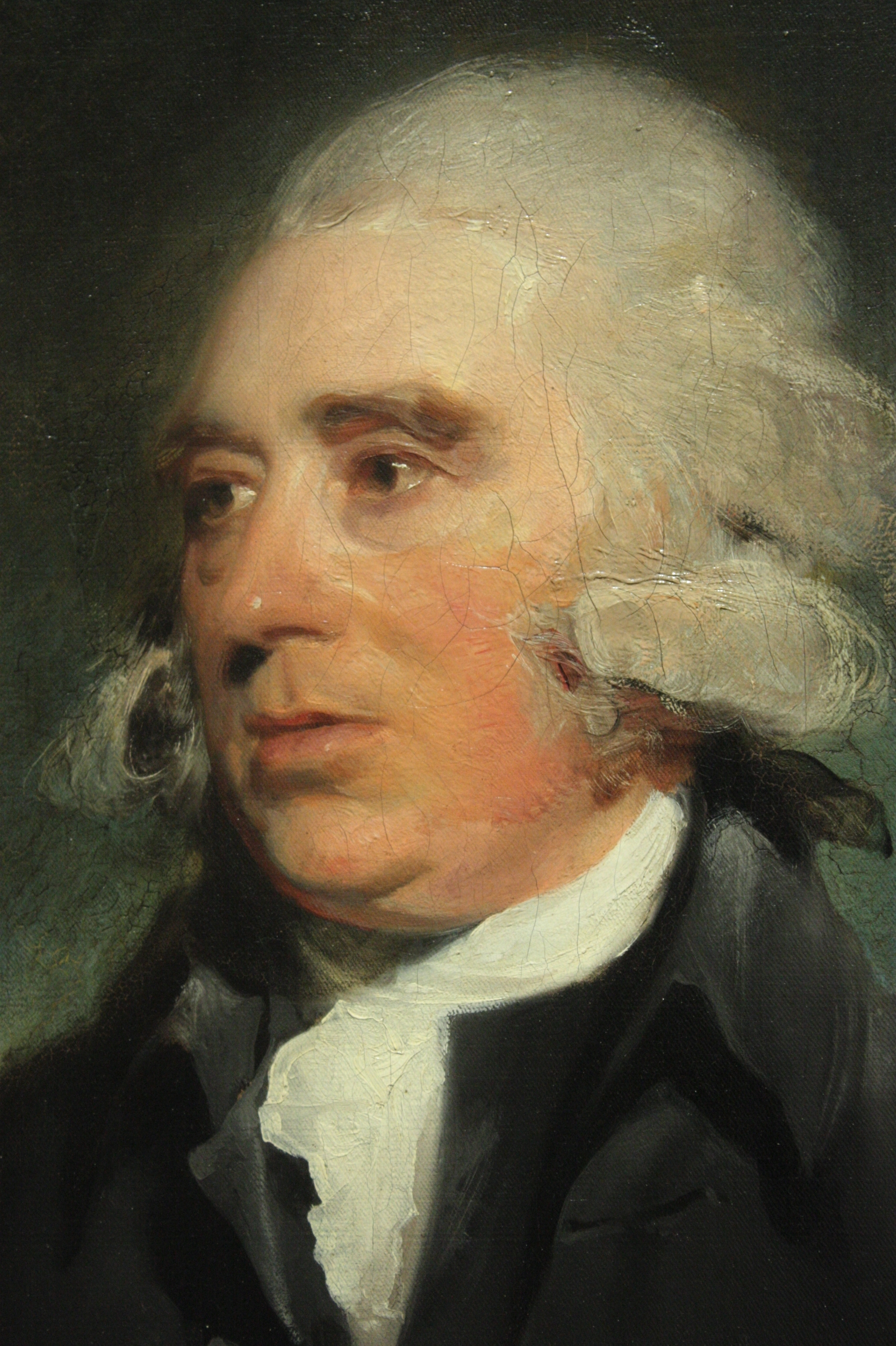
Dr John Moore (detail) by Sir Thomas Lawrence, 1790

John Moore FRSE (1729–1802) was a Scottish physician and travel author. He also edited the works of Tobias Smollett.

== Life ==
He was born on 10 October 1729 in Stirling, the son of Rev Charles Moore of Rowallan (d,1735) and his wife, Marion Anderson. The family moved to Glasgow in his youth and he was educated at Glasgow Grammar School. He was then apprenticed to Dr. John Gordon in Glasgow 1745 to 1747.

After taking a medical degree at Glasgow, he served as a Surgeon's Mate with the army in Flanders during the Seven Years' War, then proceeded to London to continue his studies, and eventually to Paris, where became surgeon to the household of the British ambassador there. In 1751 he returned to Glasgow to rejoin Dr. John Gordon (also then practising with Dr. Thomas Hamilton). From 1769 to 1778 he accompanied the Duke of Hamilton (who was linked to Thomas) on a Grand Tour of Europe; they were in Geneva from August 1772 to June 1774, they traveled through Germany in 1775-1776, in Vienna in September 1775 and then in Italy from October 1775 (Venice) to June 1776 (Geneva by 30 June after a journey to Rome, Naples, Florence, Bologna, Milan and Turin). On his return he took up residence in London.

In 1792 he accompanied Lord Lauderdale to Paris, and witnessed some of the principal scenes of the Revolution. His Journal during a Residence in France (1793) is the careful record of an eye-witness, and was frequently referred to by Thomas Carlyle.

In 1784 he was elected a Fellow of the Royal Society of Edinburgh. His proposers were Andrew Dalzell, James Gregory, and John Robison.

He died in Richmond in Surrey (now part of London) on 21 February 1802. He was buried at Vineyard Passage Burial Ground, St Mary Magdalene's, Richmond.

== Literary works ==
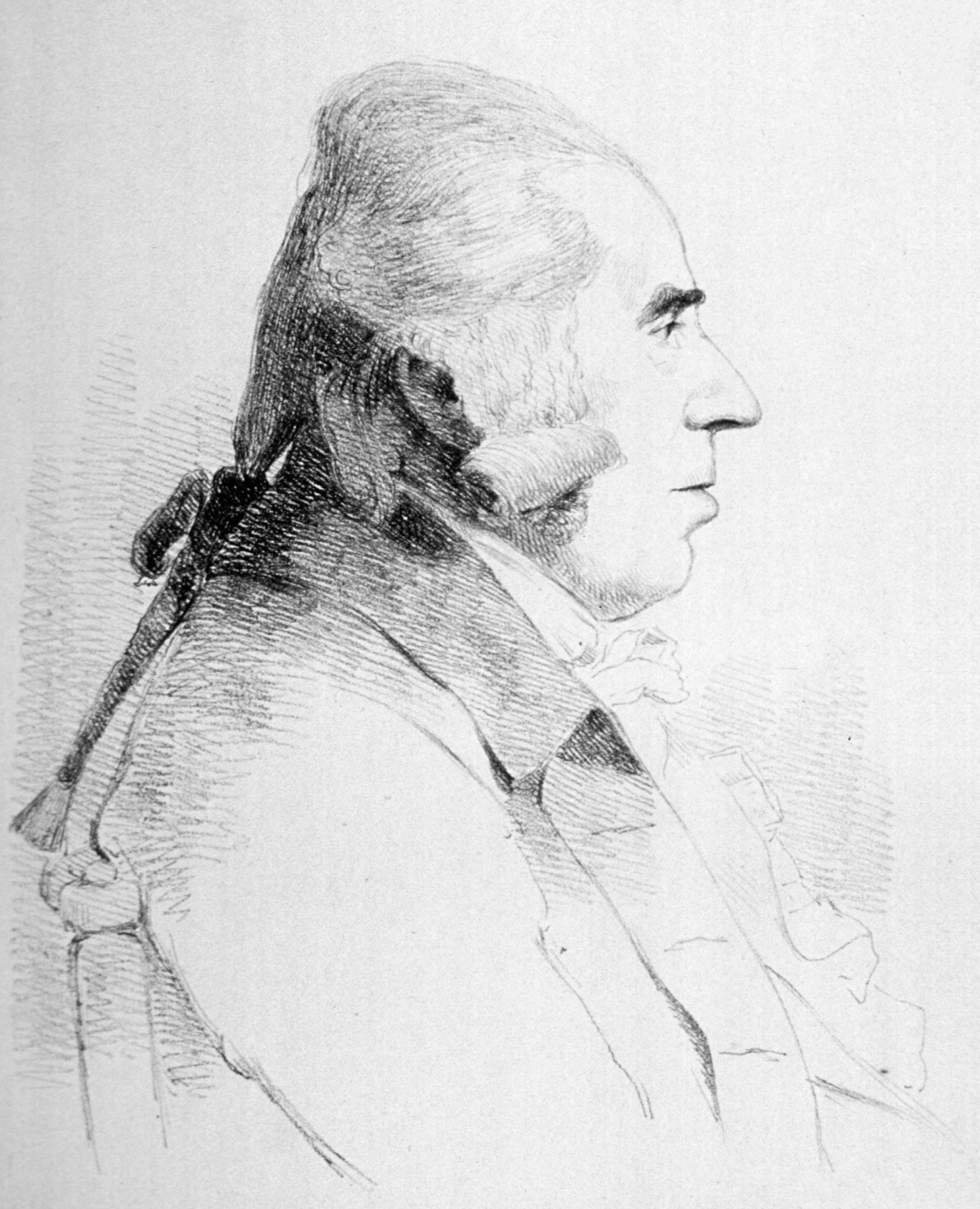
John Moore

His novel Zeluco (1789), a close analysis of the motives of a selfish profligate, produced an impression at the time. Lord Byron said that he intended Childe Harold to be a poetical Zeluco. Moore's other works include sketches of society and manners in France, Germany, Switzerland, Italy and England (A View of Society and Manners in France, Switzerland and Germany, London, W. Strahan & T. Cadell, in the Strand, 1779, 2 vol.; A View of Society and Manners in Italy, with anecdotes related to some eminent characters, London, W. Strahan & T. Cadell, 1781, 2 vol.) were also popular during his lifetime

Mordaunt. Character Sketches of Life, Characters, and Manners, in Various Countries; including the Memoirs of A French Lady of Quality was an anti-French Revolution novel in three volumes. It took the form of 34 character sketches of politicians, royalty, generals, the wealthy, and the celebrity of the day. It also contains Moore's observations as he travelled throughout Europe in the last years of the 18th century. Accounts of the heroic feats of a dashing British officer included reference to Moore's son, General Moore.

== Family ==
He had eight sons and three daughters, by Jean, daughter of John Simson, of whom the eldest surviving son was General Sir John Moore. His wife died in 1820. His other sons included Dr. James Carrick Moore (1762–1860), who wrote The Life of Lieutenant General Sir John Moore, and medical works, and Sir Graham Moore (1764–1843), who saw active naval service and became an admiral.
