= Zeluco =

1789 novel by John Moore

Zeluco is a 1789 novel by Scottish author John Moore that centers on the vicious deeds of the eponymous anti-hero, the evil Italian nobleman Zeluco. The novel's full title is Zeluco: Various Views of Human Nature, Taken from Life and Manners, Foreign and Domestic. A combination of proto-Gothic villainy and Enlightenment rationality, Zeluco contains both main plot incidents and lengthy sections of social commentary.

== Plot summary ==
=== Early intrigues ===
The first quarter of the novel details Zeluco's numerous initial wrongdoings in rapid succession. The novel opens with an incident that, according to the narrator, illustrates Zeluco's violent temper and uncontrollable impulses. Irritated by his pet sparrow, the young Zeluco crushes it to death in his hand and ignores the remonstrances of his horrified tutor. Grown into a handsome, selfish, and cruel young man, Zeluco seduces and impregnates the niece of an important noblewoman. He then deserts the niece and spends two decadent years in Italy, draining his mother's resources. Once his mother has given him the last of her money, Zeluco drops his pretence of affection, and she dies of disappointment at his anger and spite. Unconcerned about his mother's death, Zeluco attempts to marry Rosolia, a young woman with a vast potential inheritance. Rosolia's mother, convinced that Zeluco is only after her daughter's money, pretends to be pregnant. Certain that Rosolia's inheritance will be greatly reduced, Zeluco abandons her, travels to Spain, enlists as an officer in the military, and follows his regiment to Cuba. Zeluco mistreats his men in an attempt to gain a promotion, but after being chastised by his superior officer, he turns his attention to a wealthy widow. Though he offers the widow tender affections until she agrees to marry him, he treats her with cold indifference once she signs over her money and property to him, and she dies of grief. Newly interested in the wife of his rich Portuguese neighbor, Zeluco courts the wife secretly until she refuses to meet him for fear of discovery and confesses her flirtations to her husband. The Portuguese disguises himself and stabs Zeluco. After a difficult recuperation, Zeluco attempts to avenge himself upon the Portuguese by making the man think Zeluco to be the father of his newborn son. After this plot fails, Zeluco leaves Cuba for Naples.

=== Pursuing Laura ===
The remaining three-quarters of the novel is devoted to Zeluco's interactions with a particular circle of aristocrats in Italian high society. Once established in Naples, Zeluco becomes interested in Laura Seidlits, the beautiful daughter of the widow Madame de Seidlits. Determined to meet Laura, he attempts to ingratiate himself with the nobleman Signora Sporza, Madame de Seidlits' first cousin. Though she pretends to oblige him, Signora Sporza distrusts Zeluco and senses his cruel character. Laura also instinctively dislikes Zeluco and refuses his proposal of marriage. Infuriated by Laura's disdain, Zeluco stages a false attempt of robbery, rape, and murder by having his valet attack Laura and Signora Sporza's carriage. Despite Zeluco's apparently heroic false rescue, Laura remains unmoved and unwavering in her decision not to marry Zeluco. Madame de Seidlits' bank fails, however, and after learning of her mother's financial distress and being pressured by Father Pedro, Laura agrees to marry Zeluco to preserve her mother's happiness and wellbeing.

=== After the marriage ===
As in the case of the rich widow, Zeluco treats Laura cruelly as soon as he achieves his goal and sates his appetites. Laura bears his ill treatment meekly, hides her misery, and presents a positive image of her married life. Signora Sporza, as well as Laura's newly arrived half-brother Captain Seidlits and his friend Baron Carlostein, suspects the true state of affairs. Laura and Baron Carlostein begin to fall in love with one another, but Laura cuts the relationship short because she is unwilling to violate her marriage vows. Oblivious to Laura's love for Carlostein, Zeluco erroneously believes Laura to be in love with a nameless Italian nobleman. Bored with Laura, Zeluco begins an affair with Nerina, a deceitful woman who pretends to be in love with men for financial gain. Nerina manipulates Zeluco through pretended fits of jealously and eventually convinces him that his and Laura's newborn son is really the bastard child of Captain Seidlits. Giving in to his natural jealousy and furious impulses, Zeluco snatches his son from Laura's lap and strangles the child. Laura immediately faints and remains out of her senses for a number of weeks. When Laura partially regains her senses, she sees a painting of the Massacre of the Innocents, screams, and falls into a feverish frenzy. When Baron Carlostein, Captain Seidlits, and Signora Sporza examine the picture, they realize that one of the soldiers strangling a child bears a strong resemblance to Zelcuo. Laura recovers from her fever with her senses intact and writes to Zeluco asking for a separation and promising she will tell no one about the murder. Captain Seidlits, however, labels the soldier in the picture with Zeluco's name. Baron Carlostein provokes Zeluco into a duel to spare Captain Seidlits. The night before the duel is to take place, Zeluco goes to Nerina's house unannounced and catches her with another lover, who stabs him in the stomach. On his deathbed, Zeluco repents of his amoral conduct and apologizes to Captain Seidlits. After arranging her affairs and giving monetary gifts to Zeluco's relations, Laura agrees to marry Baron Carlostein and moves to Berlin with her family.

== List of characters ==
The novel includes a plethora of characters and subplots. Many remain unnamed, deemphasizing their identities and highlighting Zeluco's indiscriminating evildoing, but others command large sections of the text. The “sheer number of secondary characters and the range of subplots mean that Zeluco himself frequently disappears for large sections of the book and that interest in the central plot is diffused by an increasing focus on comic secondary characters.”

Zeluco: The novel's title character, a brutal, vain, selfish Sicilian nobleman interested only in gaining riches and fulfilling his own desires.

=== Zeluco's early intrigues ===
Zeluco's father: The only person who successfully disciplines Zeluco. His death gives Zeluco's self-indulgent nature a free rein.

Zeluco's mother: Enamored of her son, she gives in to his every desire until she is no longer of use to him and dies of a broken heart.

Countess Brunella: A noblewoman who delights in railing against young women who are unchaste.

Countess Brunella's niece: The first young woman who Zeluco pursues. He has a love affair with her until she becomes pregnant, then abandons her.

Rosolia: The young heiress who Zeluco attempts to marry. She is prevented from doing so only by her mother's ingenuity.

The widow: Zeluco's first wife. After obtaining all her lands and money, he treats her cruelly and she dies of a broken heart.

Hanno: One of the widow's favorite slaves. Zeluco beats him so severely that he dies. His ill usage and Zeluco's violent treatment of his other slaves prompts the Physician's antislavery debate with Zeluco.

The Cuban Physician: The doctor who attends both Zeluco and the Portuguese. Providing a voice of reason, he asks Zeluco to treat his slaves more kindly and convinces the Portuguese of his wife's innocence.

The Portuguese: Zeluco's neighbor. He disguises himself in his wife's clothing and stabs Zeluco in the chest after learning that Zeluco was pursuing his wife.

The Portuguese's wife: Zeluco's would-be paramour, unjustly accused of bearing his bastard child.

=== The Seidlits circle ===
Signora Sporza: Madame de Seidlits' first cousin. A perceptive society woman, she dearly loves Laura and her mother, but her unwillingness to become involved in the affairs of others keeps her from preventing Laura and Zeluco's marriage.

Madame de Seidlits: Laura's mother and Colonel Seidlits' wife. A devoted wife and mother, her one failing is her expensive tastes. Her inability to live within her income level contributes to Laura's willingness to marry Zeluco.

Colonel Seidlits: Madame de Seidlits' late husband. A Protestant, he firmly refuses to attempt to convert his Catholic wife and rebuffs her attempts to convert him.

Captain Seidlits: Colonel Seidlits' son and Laura's devoted half-brother. An excellent soldier whose fiery temper succeeds in the battlefield but leads to social tension.

Laura Seidlits: Madame de Seidlits' daughter. Beautiful, intelligent, honorable, and accomplished, Laura is sensible of her own desires and strong enough to protect them. Only her affection for her mother weakens her resolve not to marry Zeluco.

Baron Carlostein: Captain Seidlits' friend and fellow officer. His visit to the Seidlits household in Laura's childhood forms her idea of an ideal man. In love with Laura, he is willing to do anything to protect her from the evils of Zeluco.

Father Mulo: A Neapolitan priest. A long-winded and opinionated relation of Laura and Madame de Seidlits, he persuades Madame de Seidlits to attempt to convert Colonel Seidlits to Catholicism.

Father Pedro: Father confessor to Signora Sporza, Laura, and Madame de Seidlits. An insincere priest, he colludes with Zeluco to persuade Laura to marry him after accepting a bribe ostensibly used to improve the church.

=== The English ===
Mr. N—: A young English nobleman, nephew to a baronet and friend to Signora Sporza, Mr. Steele, and Mr. Squander, as well as Captain Seidlits and Baron Carlostein. He also loves Laura but does not express his feelings in deference to Carlostein.

Mr. Transfer: A rich businessman who retired to the English countryside. Uncle to Mr. Steele and brother to Mrs. Steele, he eventually learns to value his relations in addition to his fortune after connecting with his nephew.

Mrs. Steele: Mr. Transfer's sister, who married a poor man Mr. Transfer deemed an inappropriate husband. Though initially ignored by Mr. Transfer after her husband's death, she reconciles with her brother and comes to live with him after Mr. Steele brings them together.

Mr. Steele: Nephew of Mr. Transfer. Jovial, amicable, unaccomplished, and in love with Miss Warren, he eventually gains her hand in marriage after being improved by his travels with Mr. N—.

Miss Warren: Friend and companion of Lady Elizabeth, she lost her father in a naval battle. She initially refuses to marry Mr. Steele because of his mediocre education and skills.

Lady Elizabeth: A noblewoman who is Mr. Transfer's neighbor, she is the benefactor of Miss Warren.

Mr. Squander: A dour Englishman who gambles compulsively.

=== The Servants ===
The valet: Zeluco's valet, willing to assist Zeluco in his various plots. Notably, he seduces the Portuguese's wife's maid and pretends to be robber threatening Laura's carriage. He betrays Zeluco to Signora Sporza, however, after Zeluco ignores him after courting Nerina.

George Buchanan: Mr. N—'s Scottish servant. A Protestant, Buchanan attempts to sever any connection between Mr. N— and Laura for fear of his master marrying a Catholic. A Whig, Buchanan opposed the Jacobite Rising of 1745.

Duncan Targe: Captain Seidlits' Scottish servant. Targe supported the Jacobite uprising, and his and Buchanan's political differences lead them to duel with claymores.

=== Other characters ===
The Italian Nobleman: A member of high society in Italy. Because of his interest in Laura, Zeluco erroneously suspects that Laura returns the Nobleman's affections

Nerina: A young con artist who attracts Zeluco's attention and places him under her power. Nerina's pretended affection for Zeluco and jealousy of Laura cause Zeluco to murder his son and lead to his downfall.

Bertram: morally upright son of a clergyman. Zeluco wins a huge portion of Bertram's money through gambling. Zeluco initially considers employing Bertram as a confederate in his plots, but reconsiders after discovering Bertram's good character.

== Themes and motifs ==
"Vice leads to endless misery": Present in the opening sentence in the novel, this theme recurs through comments from both the narrator and the characters. As Kelly notes, remarks about Zeluco's inner feelings illustrate Moore's Enlightenment emphasis on characters' internal states.

Being uneducated: Zeluco disdains learning, Mr. Steele receives a mediocre education, the servants hold irrational prejudices in favor of their own countries, and Mr. Transfer confuses the Roman statues in his garden.

Public opinion: People in Zeluco's and Countess Brunella's social circles are delighted when they suffer, but every person who knows Laura grieves at her distress.

Constant mental suffering of wrongdoers: The narrator frequently comments on Zeluco's persistent unhappiness despite his material wealth and comfortable situation.

Bumbling, interfering servants: The Portuguese couple's maid is used against them, Buchanan steers Mr. N— away from Laura because he deems her religion unacceptable, Buchanan's letter becomes an object of amusement for the aristocrats and the reader.

Reason versus passion: Laura, the Cuban physician, and Colonel Seidlits embody reason, while Zeluco, his mother, and Captain Seidlits give in to their emotions.

Physiognomy: Laura and Madame de Seidlits discuss whether or not a person's character manifests itself in his or her appearance; the narrator remarks that Zeluco is handsome despite his evil nature. Manipulation, power and control: Zeluco dissembles in order to achieve his sexual conquests; he becomes obsessed with forcing Laura to yield to his desires; he feels the need to both display her beauty and prevent other people from interacting with her.

Incorrect assumptions: Zeluco initially assumes that Laura is attracted to him and is astonished when she refuses his proposal; he later believes that she is attracted to the Italian Nobleman; he never doubts Nerina's affection for him. The Portuguese and later Zeluco himself are easily led to believe that their sons are bastards based only on manufactured circumstantial evidence.

Love versus money: Mrs. Steele marries for love, while Mr. Transfer is shocked that she does not choose the more affluent match he arranges for her; Laura adamantly refuses to marry Zeluco because she does not love him, but is eventually forced into doing so because of a need for money.

Filial affection: Laura is willing to sacrifice her personal happiness for her mother's; Zeluco cares only about himself and disregards his filial duty to his mother.

== Parallels ==
As Zeluco himself notes, his strangulation of his son mirrors the crushing of his sparrow when he was a child.

As the narrator notes but Zeluco fails to see, Nerina seduces Zeluco just as he seduces Rosolia and the widow; she also convinces him that his child is a bastard, just as he convinces the Portuguese of the same untruth.

== Foils ==
Bertram as Zeluco's foil: Bertram delights in helping others and values moral satisfaction over material comforts; Zeluco thinks only of his own pleasure and is disturbed by Bertram's mention of economy and charity.

Laura's near-death as the foil to Zeluco's: When Laura sinks into illness after her son's death, her servants dread her death; when Zeluco lies ill after the Portuguese's stabbing, his slaves mourn his recovery.

== Style ==
Point of View: The narrator is third person omniscient; although not an epistolary novel, Zeluco does include letters from one character to another.

Mixing Genres: The narrator claims in the opening paragraphs that the novel is a morality tale, but Zeluco is really a complex combination of genres. The book is often portrayed as an early Gothic novel, but the text does not adhere strictly to the Gothic genre, emphasizing realistic situations rather than fantastical Gothic settings and events. Moreover, Zeluco lacks the deliberate creation of supernatural or apparently supernatural terror present in novels such as Ann Radcliffe's The Romance of the Forest. Instead, the novel focuses on the everyday causes of Zeluco's evil (an impulsive, selfish nature and an overindulgent parent) and his downfall (the vain assumption that his lover truly cares for him). Pam Perkins, editor of the 2008 edition of Zeluco, succinctly explains this odd combination: “In Zeluco, Enlightenment rationality meets Gothic excess.” Gary Kelly also links Zeluco to the Enlightenment, noting that all of Moore's novels serve as “vehicle[s] for Enlightenment social criticism.” (See discussion of social commentary below.) Zeluco is the novel's most unenlightened figure, and his excessive passions and uncontrolled impulses lead to his downfall; moral characters such as Bertram privilege rational thought over emotion and are rewarded for doing so. Zeluco also reflects Moore's earlier works of travel literature: character reactions to and descriptions of the countries they visit echo the writings in a travel diary.

Humor: Zeluco contains many instances of dry humor. One example occurs when Rosolia claims that the suitor she marries after Zeluco abandons her is the only man who can make her completely happy. Her mother responds, “I hope, my dear, […] he is the only man who ever will attempt it.” Other characters, such as Buchanan, Targe, and the various priests, are mocked for their small-mindedness and obstinacy, illustrating Moore's Enlightenment emphasis on reason and education.

Tone: Though serious when discussing Zeluco's mental disturbance due to his wrongdoing, the narrator's “urbanely amused voice” acts as a “unifying force” for the novel. As both 18th century and contemporary critics note, this humorous tone renders Zeluco's moral message and long interludes unrelated to the main plot palatable to readers.

Epigraphs: Almost all of the novel's 100 chapters begins with brief quotations from well-known authors such as Alexander Pope, Shakespeare, Ovid, Virgil, and François de La Rochefoucauld. Each quotation corresponds to the subject matter of the chapter it introduces. For example, the chapter in which Zeluco mistreats his troops out of a vain desire to impress his superior officers begins with “La ferocité naturelle fait moins de cruels que l'amour proper” (“Natural ferocity makes fewer people cruel than does self-love”). The epigraphs, many of which are in Latin or French, provide a marked contrast Zeluco's lack of education and also imply that Moore wrote for an educated readership that could “share the narrator's easy cosmopolitanism”

Social Commentary: Many critics note the novel's extensive asides regarding social issues of Moore's time; some argue that the social commentary equals or overshadows the overtly moral message of the primary plot.

=== Examples of social commentary ===
The Slavery Debate: The debate on slavery takes place early on in the novel, after Zeluco gains a plantation in Cuba (one location in the novel that Moore notably did not visit) and becomes a cruel master of the slaves there. The titular villain is unsurprisingly pro-slavery, while an educated physician – possibly provided as a stand-in for Moore's own opinions on the subject – makes the arguments against slavery. These arguments cover the differing perspectives of the time, including whether or not the slaves were better off in slavery than they were in their own countries. They also argue whether the African people are equal to Europeans, and notions of property and the right to own people as property. This debate eventually leads to the question of whether it is better to be seen as “the distributor of happiness” or the “inflictor of pain”, a problem that will follow Zeluco throughout the story, both in his military career and eventual marriage to the virtuous Laura.

Moore's anti-slavery stance in Zeluco is particularly notable because of its being published in 1789, which marked roughly the beginning of the British abolitionist movement. The first meeting of the Society for Effecting the Abolition of the Slave Trade was formed on 22 May 1787 – 20 years before the slave trade was abolished with the passage of the Slave Trade Act 1807. The campaign was heavily influenced by slave uprisings in the West Indies, which was where Zeluco held his own fictional plantation, and was supported by hundreds of thousands of people, including – in all probability, judging by the arguments in Zeluco – Moore himself. Moore also provides a sympathetic slave character in the form of Hanno to stand opposite his villainous slave owner, just another piece of evidence for his anti-slave trade stance.

Religious Intolerance: Protestantism vs. Catholicism: In one of quite a few asides Moore makes for his minor characters, a debate takes place between the late Colonel Seidlits and his Protestant clergyman relation about whether or not it is proper to convert Colonel Seidlit's Catholic wife to Protestantism, which Moore – a Protestant himself – tends to portray as the superior religion. Throughout the novel, priests are shown as either corrupt (like the bumbling and easily bought Father Pedro), incompetent (like the Cuban priest who riles up the Portuguese and his wife rather than helping them), or unnecessarily long-winded (like Father Mulo). They also tend to interfere where they should not, like in Laura's ill-advised marriage to Zeluco, the multiple failed conversions from both Protestantism to Catholicism and vice versa, and the dangerous ruse against the Portuguese family.

This division between Protestantism and Roman Catholicism can be traced all the way back to the Protestant Reformation in the early 16th century, when Martin Luther, among other Protestant leaders, sought to break away from the old customs and rituals of the church in order to make religion more accessible. In his debate with Colonel Seidlets, the clergyman makes reference to the arguments against the Catholics placing too much faith in rituals like transubstantiation, and directly refers to historical events taking place during the Reformation, as well.

Despite this divide between the two religions (which can also be seen in Buchanan's refusal to allow his Protestant master, Mr. N—, to marry the Catholic Laura), Colonel Seidlits steadfastly refuses to denounce his wife's religion and insists that everyone should be able to practice their own religious beliefs without feeling pressure to convert. In this way he stands in sharp contrast to the negatively portrayed priests and clergymen who disdain every religion except their own, so it could be argued that Moore is not so much supporting Protestantism but encouraging freedom of religion.

Scottish Politics: Being a Scotsman himself, Moore also includes a debate on the state of Scottish politics about three quarters of the way through the novel, in which two proud Scottish servants – Buchanan and Targe – argue about the Jacobite Rising of 1745, during which Charles Edward Stewart attempted to reclaim the British throne. This eventually leads to an argument about Scottish nationalism, including whether Mary, Queen of Scots plotted to kill her husband Henry Stuart, Lord Darnley, and whether Scotland should have joined with England under the Acts of Union 1707. The issues are presented as polarizing the Scottish nation, showing the divisions between the Whig and Tory parties in particular, and especially their opinions on kings and the rights of royalty. Targe – the Tory – has loyalty for the divine right of kings, whereas Buchanan – the Whig – is more loyal to country than king.

Moore's inclusion of this debate and the resulting duel shows the powerful nature of Scottish national pride, which is also shown when the overly patriotic Buchanan is injured in a duel between the two Scotsmen and refuses treatment from a French physician, instead insisting that he will wait until one of his own countrymen is available.

National Stereotypes: In 1772 Moore was hired as the tutor and private physician to the young Duke of Hamilton, and ended up accompanying the young nobleman on his Grand Tour through Italy, Germany and France. This Tour was meant to expose the young Duke to foreign societies, through which he would learn about other countries' languages, architecture, geography, and culture and return to his own country ready to join the British ruling class. During this time Moore was exposed to high-class societies that a man of his station would normally never get to see, and the experience – notably his time among the upper echelons of Italy – greatly influenced his portrayal of high Italian society seen in Zeluco.

Moore's visits to other countries can also be seen in his characters' – particularly Baron Carlostein, Captain Seidlits, Mr. N—, and Mr. Steele – discussions of the traits of people from different countries, especially France, Italy and England. The English are generally portrayed as “reserved” and melancholy, whereas the Italian are “ingenious” and “civilized” and the French are “frank” and – according to the minor character Thomas Dawson – quite dissimilar to the Scottish, particularly in their armies and unequal treatment of women.

== Critical reception ==
=== Initial response ===
Zeluco was immediately and immensely successful. Although anonymous, the book was generally attributed to Moore because of its similarity in style to his travel literature. Most reviews at the time of publication lauded both the literary technique and moral message of the novel. In June 1789, Scots Magazine asserted that Zeluco “is not a common novel,” praising Moore for creating a work of lasting merit and a positive moral message “which, until men change their natures, can never be too often inculcated, or too powerfully enforced.” The European Magazine and London Review expressed a similar opinion in October 1789 and placed a particular emphasis on Moore's ability to express serious messages in a “lively style” and create a narrator who is a “laughing philosopher.” The September 1789 issue of The English Review, however, was highly critical, deeming Zeluco a merely mediocre novel. The reviewer disparaged Moore's many subplots and asides as useless digressions and takes issue with his mocking portrayal of priests and his favorable portrayal of physicians.

=== Influence ===
Zeluco provided inspiration for the title character of Lord Byron's poem Childe Harold's Pilgrimage and was transformed into a stage play in 1812. Anna Laetitia Barbauld's glowing review in an 1810 edition of The British Novelists seemed to indicate the novel's lasting success. Zeluco's popularity faded, however, and the novel remained out of print from 1827 to 2008.

=== Modern views ===
Twentieth century literary critics tended to ignore Zeluco, and their opinions of the book were generally not favorable. Patricia Meyer Spacks asserts that Zeluco's wholly evil character is flat rather than compelling, and that Laura's sensibility serves only to remove all traces of her agency. She claims that the combination of Zeluco's and Laura's intrinsically opposite personalities leads only to a “narrative stalemate.” Pam Perkins, however, argues against such negative criticism, maintaining that the central plot of the novel was not Moore's sole focus. Examining Zeluco's Enlightenment-driven narrative style and incisive social commentary, she contends, can offer new insights into life at the end of the 18th century.
