= Harriet Jane Moore =

Watercolour artist

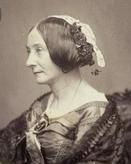
Harriet Jane Moore c. 1860s

Harriet Jane Carrick Moore (1801 – 6 March 1884) was a British watercolour artist who is best known for her drawings of Michael Faraday's work at the Royal Institution. She documented his apartment, study, and laboratory in a series of watercolour paintings in the early 1850s. Letters between Faraday and Moore survive at the Institution of Engineering and Technology. She, and her family, were close with the Swiss-born artist Henry Fuseli.

She was the eldest of the five children of James Carrick Moore (1762–1860) and Harriet Henderson (1779–1866). She was the niece of Sir John Moore, a British army general in the Peninsular War, and the granddaughter of the actor John Henderson.

== Gallery ==
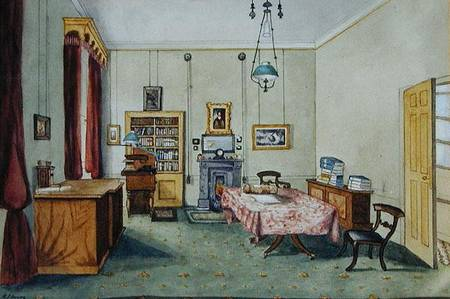
Michael Faraday's Study on the second floor at The Royal Institution, 1850–1855

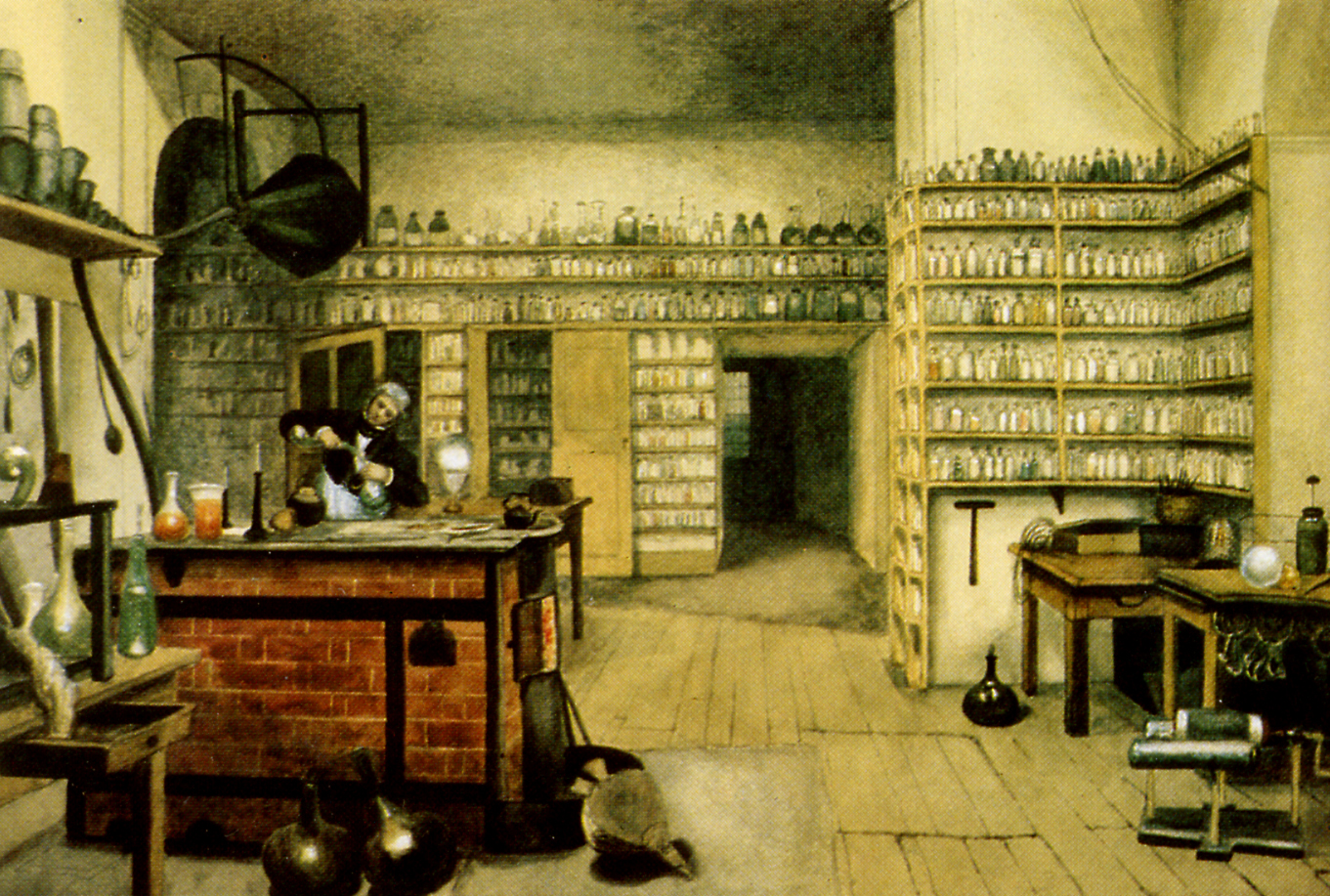
Michael Faraday in his laboratory. c. 1850s

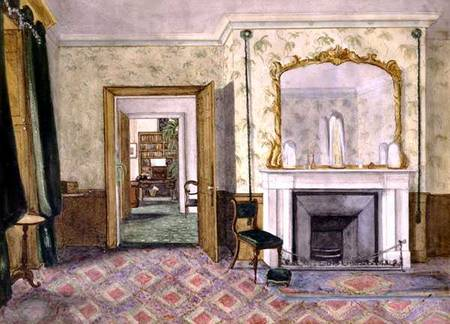
Michael Faraday's flat at the Royal Institution, between 1850 and 1855
