= James Carrick Moore =

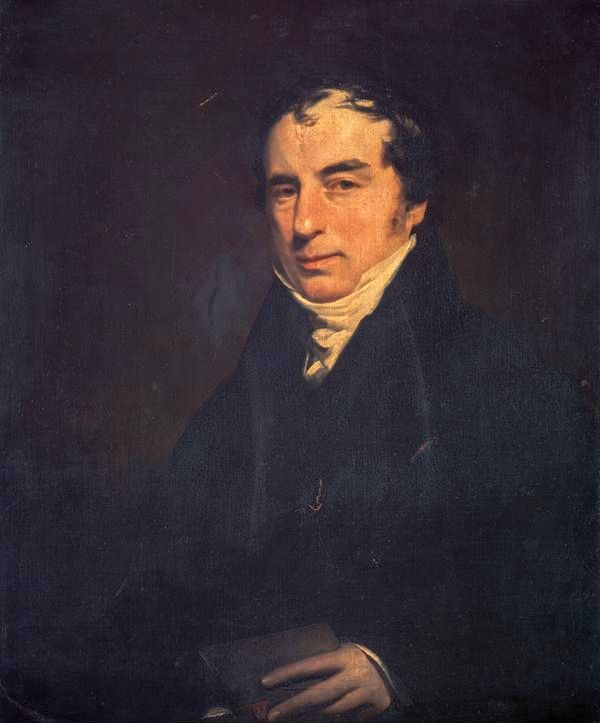
- James Carrick Moore
- Born: James Moore; 21 December 1762; Glasgow
- Died: 1 June 1860 (aged 97); 9 Clarges Street, London
- Known for: Surgery; Vaccination advocacy Biography of brother
- Spouse: Harriet Henderson
- Children: Harriet Jane; Louisa; Julia; John Carrick; Graham Francis
- Scientific career
- Institutions: St George's Hospital

James Moore [later Carrick Moore] (1762–1860) was a biographer and surgeon. He had a particular interest in the new practice of vaccination, which he strongly advocated. He was a friend and supporter of Edward Jenner. Moore succeeded Jenner as president of the National Vaccine Institute.

== Biography ==
James Moore was born on 21 December 1762 in Glasgow, one of eight sons and three daughters of John Moore, physician, and Jean Simson. Like his father he studied medicine – in Edinburgh and London – and became a house surgeon at St George's Hospital. He served as an army medical officer in 1781 during the American Revolutionary War and returned to Britain in early 1782. He later was surgeon to the 2nd Regiment of Life Guards.

Moore published extensively on reducing pain during surgery; the history of smallpox; the history of vaccination; and produced pamphlets defending vaccination and arguing against the “anti-vaxxers” of the day. He is now best known for his biography of his elder brother Lieutenant-General Sir John Moore who died at the Battle of Corunna in 1809, during the Peninsular War. Carrick was added to the family name in 1821 when James Moore inherited the 6,000-acre Corsewall estate in Dumfries and Galloway from his cousin, the merchant banker Robert Carrick.

== Publications ==
1. Moore, James (1784). A Method of Preventing Or Diminishing Pain in Several Operations of Surgery. London.
2. Moore, James (1789). A Dissertation on the process of nature in the filling up of cavities, healing of wounds, and restoring parts which have been destroyed in the human body, etc. London.
3. Moore, James (1792). An essay on the materia medica. in which The Theories of the late Dr. Cullen are considered; together with Some Opinions of Mr. Hunter, and other celebrated Writers. London: T. Cadell.
4. Moore, James (1806). A reply to the anti-vaccinists. London: John Murray.
5. Moore, James (1806). Remarks on Mr. Birch's 'Serious reasons for uniformly objecting to the practice of vaccination'. London: J. Murray.
6. Iconoclastis (James Moore) (1807). Pethox Parvus: dedicated, without permission, to the remnant of blind priests of that idolatry. London: J. Murray.
7. Moore, James (180p). A Narrative of the Campaign of the British Army in Spain: Commanded by His Excellency Sir John Moore, KB. London: Joseph Johnson.
8. Moore, James (1811). Two letters to Dr. Jones on the composition of the Eau médicinale d'Husson. London: J. Johnson & Co.
9. Moore, James (1815). History of the Small Pox. London.
10. Moore, James Carrick (1817). The history and practice of vaccination. London: J. Callow.
11. Moore, James Carrick (1834). The Life of Lieutenant-General Sir John Moore, KB, by his brother. London: John Murray.

== Family ==
James Moore married Harriet Henderson, daughter of the actor John Henderson, at St George's, Hanover Square on 31 December 1798. They had five children: Harriet Jane (1801–84), Louisa (1802–53), Julia (1803–1904), John Carrick (1805–98) and Graham Francis (1806–1883). Four are particularly noteworthy:

- Harriet Jane was an artist who documented Faraday's apartment, study, and laboratory in a series of watercolour paintings in the early 1850s.
- Julia donated Titania and Bottom by Henry Fuseli, RA to the National Gallery in 1888 and also a portrait by Thomas Gainsborough of her great-grandfather John Henderson. "On the instruction of her late sister Harriet Moore, Julia donated approximately 100 Fuseli drawings (the Roman album 1885,0314.201-296) and four volumes of John Knowles's Life of Fuseli, extra-illustrated by Harriet Moore (1885,0314.297) to the British Museum in March 1885". Julia Moore died on 12 July 1904 at 23 Bolton Street Mayfair; she was aged 100. "Miss Moore, who was well known for many years in the best society, was a clever woman, full of interesting reminiscences ... she was the last link between the present age and one fertile in high intellectual distinction".
- John Carrick Moore was admitted to Westminster School on 18 September 1815. and then entered Queens' College, Cambridge in 1823, “proceeding to the degree of M.A., and devoting much attention to mathematics and physics”. He became an eminent geologist and friend of Charles Lyell. He was elected a Fellow of the Geological Society in which, at various times. he served as Secretary and vice-president. He was made a Fellow of the Royal Society in 1855, and died at his house in Eaton Square on 10 February 1898, aged 94.
- Graham Francis Moore took on the name Graham Francis Moore Mitchell Esmeade “in compliance with the will of his cousin, Anne Michell, of Monkton”. He was appointed Sheriff of Wiltshire in 1851. He died in 1883 and is buried at St Andrew Cobham, Surrey.

James Carrick Moore died on 1 June 1860 at 9 Clarges Street, London. His wife Harriet died on 15 October 1866.
