= John Henderson (actor) =

English actor (1747–1785)

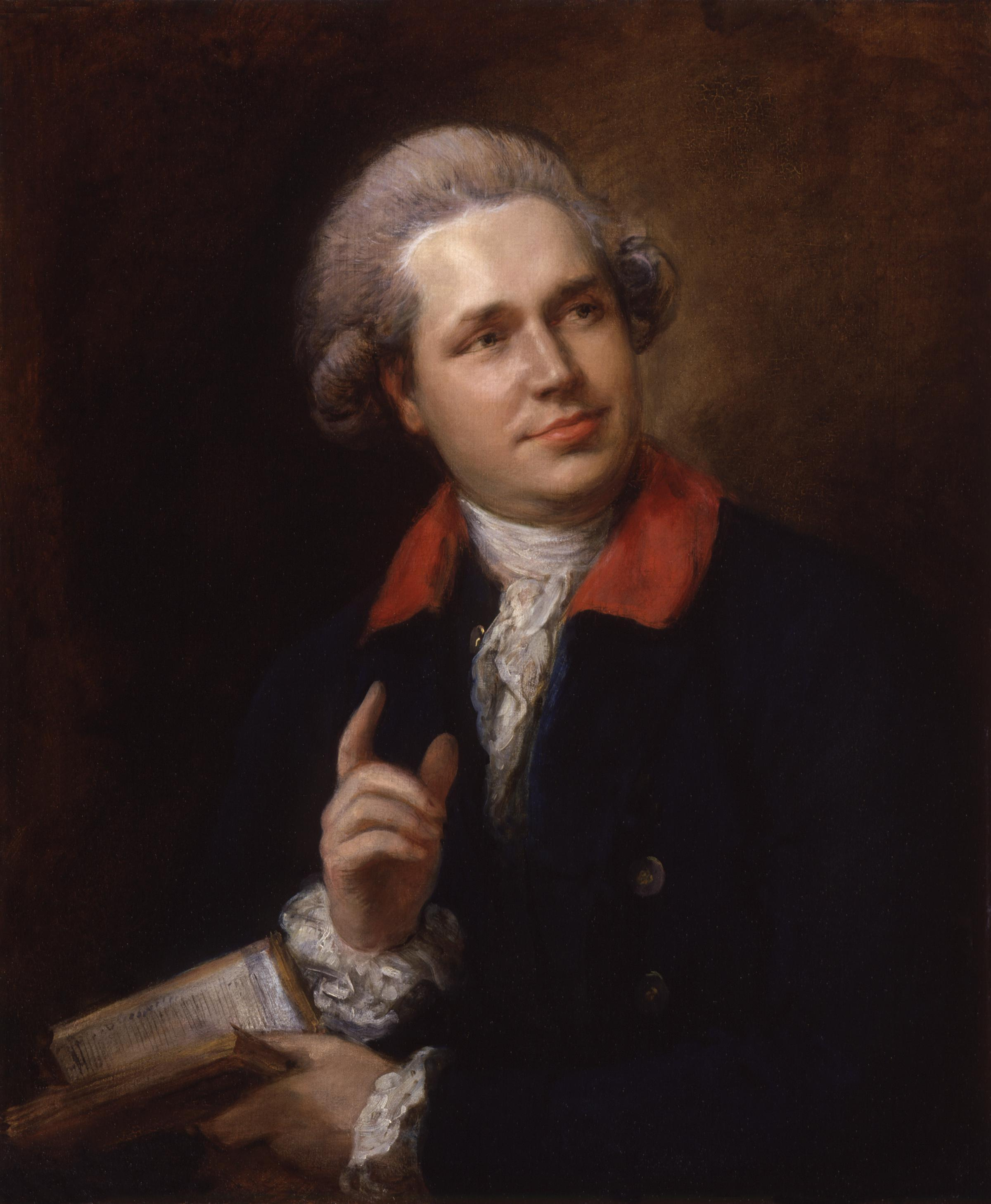
- John Henderson. Oil on canvas by Thomas Gainsborough
- Born: 1747; Cheapside, London
- Died: 25 November 1785 (aged 37–38); 9 Buckingham Street, London
- Burial place: Westminster Abbey
- Occupation: Actor
- Years active: 1772-1785
- Spouse: Jane Figgins
- Children: Harriet

John Henderson (1747–1785) was an English actor who played many Shakespearean and other roles. He first acted in Bath, where he was known as "The Bath Roscius", and then in London. Had he not died young he would have been remembered as a worthy successor to David Garrick.

== Early life and education ==
Henderson was born in Goldsmith Street, Cheapside, London, and was baptized on 8 March 1747. His father, an Irish factor, died when he was an infant and he and his elder brother were brought up and educated by their mother in Newport Pagnell. He always remembered his obligation to her and cared for her in later life. Henderson was introduced to literature, including Shakespeare, and encouraged to learn passages by heart.

He attended Dr Sterling's school (where Clive of India had been a pupil) at Hemel Hempstead, during 1758. He showed artistic promise and spent 6 years in London with Daniel Fournier where he studied drawing and contributed some etchings to Fournier’s book A Treatise of the Theory and Practice of Perspective, wherein the Principles of that most Useful Art are Laid Down Henderson was living with a relative of his mother, the silversmith William Cripps, in St James Street when Cripps died in 1766. He then found an unnamed patron who supported him and encouraged his ambition to be an actor.

=== Theatrical ambitions and Bath debut ===
Henderson joined a literary club in Islington whose members read from various authors for their mutual amusement. He proved to be an excellent reader and a clever mimic and, being particularly interested in Laurence Sterne's Tristram Shandy, he took the nickname Shandy. A fellow-member was John Ireland who became a close friend of Henderson and published his letters, poems and useful biographical anecdotes. Henderson’s imitation of David Garrick's Ode delivered at the Shakespeare Jubilee in Stratford upon Avon in 1769 was said to be hard to distinguish from the original recital. He asked George Garrick, younger brother and assistant at the Theatre Royal, Drury Lane to Garrick, for an audition, but was unsuccessful. Among other disappointments were rebuffs from George Colman, manager of the Covent Garden Theatre, and failure to interest the playwright Paul Hiffernan in casting him in one of his plays. Henderson voice was deemed ‘woolly’, but eventually David Garrick auditioned him and suggested he might be suitable for a provincial theatre, recommending him to John Palmer of Bath. Palmer managed the Old Orchard Street Theatre which became the Theatre Royal Bath in 1768.

On 6 October 1772, a production of Hamlet was advertised there with ‘a new actor arrived from London’ in the title role. Henderson played under the pseudonym Courtney and was acclaimed, and also as King Richard III. He made his first appearance under his real name on 26 December as Hotspur in Henry IV, Part 1; he added Benedick in Much Ado About Nothing and Macbeth to his Shakespearean roles and played in Ben Jonson's Every Man in his Humour, the Duke of Buckingham's The Rehearsal, Susanna Centlivre's The Wonder, and The Earl of Essex, by Henry Jones. Henderson’s friends in Bath included Thomas Gainsborough, who painted his portrait, and the dramatist Richard Cumberland. Known as "The Bath Roscius", Henderson performed from 1772 until 1778 in Palmer’s company, adding Lear, Othello, Posthumus, Shylock, King John, and Falstaff (in both Henry IV and The Merry Wives of Windsor) to his Shakespearean repertoire. He also performed in Bristol and, in the summer of 1776, in Birmingham; here he was impressed by 21-year-old Sarah Siddons, but failed to persuade Palmer to engage her.

=== London Stage ===
Despite his success in Bath and other provincial theatres Henderson’s ambition to act on the London stage was thwarted, in part by Garrick who may have feared a rival, until 1777. George Colman had purchased the Theatre Royal Haymarket with the previous owner, Samuel Foote, as his principal actor but in the 1777 summer season there Foote was unable to perform due to ill health. Colman offered Henderson his first London appearance, as Shylock, on 11 June. From then until mid September he successfully played Shylock, Hamlet, Falstaff (in both The Merry Wives of Windsor and Henry IV Part 1), Richard in King Richard III as well as Don John in The Chances, Leon in Rule a Wife and Have a Wife, and Bayes in The Rehearsal.

In 1776 David Garrick retired and Richard Brinsley Sheridan took over management of the Theatre Royal, Drury Lane. Henderson’s first appearance on that stage was as Hamlet on 30 September 1777. He added Richard III, Shylock, Falstaff (in three plays), King John, Benedick, and Macbeth to his Shakespearean repertoire during the 1777–78 season, as well as playing Horatius in The Roman Father, Don John, Bayes, Brutus in The Roman Sacrifice (by William Shirley), Bobadil in Every Man in His Humour, Edgar Atheling in The Battle of Hastings, and Valentine in Love for Love. During the summer of 1778 Henderson performed in Dublin and Liverpool as well as Bath, where he was still under contract to Palmer. He began the 1778–79 season at Drury Lane as Falstaff in The Merry Wives and continued there with much the same repertoire (adding Father Dominick in ‘The Spanish Fryar, Bireno in The Law of Lombardy and Beverley in Centlivre’s The Gamester). He played King Lear at his own benefit performance in March 1779, for which tickets were available at his home in Buckingham Street, yielding £259.

Henderson played occasionally at the Theatre Royal, Covent Garden during the 1778 –79 season but from the autumn of 1779 that theatre became his base. Roles added to his now extensive repertoire included Gloster and Hastings in Jane Shore, Sir John Brute in ’’The Provok’d Wife’’, the title role in Vanburgh’s Aesop, Sforza in The Duke of Milan, Austin in The Count of Narbonne, Sir Giles Over-reach in A New Way to Pay Old Debts, Maskwell in The Double Dealer, Lusignan in Zara, Sciolto in The Fair Penitent, Evander in The Grecian Daughter, Pierre in Venice Preserv’d and Mr Ordeal in Fashionable Levities, a new play by Leonard McNally. He also played further Shakespearean roles: Leontes, Malvolio, King John and Iago. ‘Mr Henderson’ was invariably at the top of the cast list when performances were advertised in the press. Many of his roles had already been played by David Garrick, and he was considered to be a worthy successor. Henderson's Iago "was perhaps the crown of all his serious achievements. It was all profoundly intellectual like the character… Though a studious man, there was no discipline apparent in the art of Henderson; he moved and looked as humour or passion required". Although short of stature and sometimes awkward in his movements, Henderson’s character depiction was acclaimed and engravings of him in the roles of Hamlet, Iago and Macbeth became popular.

Henderson travelled during summer seasons to perform in Bristol, Birmingham, Ireland, Liverpool and Edinburgh. While in Edinburgh in 1784 Henderson played Falstaff, in which role he was caricatured by John Kay, alongside Mr Charteris as Bardolph.

During Lent in 1784 (when theatres were closed) Henderson joined Thomas Sheridan in a series of readings at Hickford's Long Room; these were repeated the following year at Freemasons’ Hall and led in 1796, after the deaths of both speakers, to the publication of Sheridan's and Henderson's Practical Method of Reading and Reciting English Poetry.

Henderson in Macbeth

Henderson as Iago

Henderson as Falstaff

Henderson as Bayes

=== Death ===
Horatius in William Whitehead's The Roman Father at Covent Garden on 8 November 1785 was Henderson’s last performance and he died, aged 38, at his home, 9 Buckingham Street, on 25 November. The London Chronicle reported that ‘nothing could be more sudden or unexpected than the death of Mr Henderson’.

Henderson’s funeral on 3 December was widely reported. A procession of fifteen mourning coaches and other carriages accompanied his body to Westminster Abbey where he was interred close to the tomb of David Garrick and the memorial to Shakespeare. The inscription, now worn away, read "Underneath this stone are interr'd the remains of John Henderson who died the 25th day of Novembr. 1785 aged 38 years". Among the many mourners were actors who had worked with Henderson, including Francis Aicken, John Quick, Richard Wroughton, John Edwin, Charles Macklin, Joseph George Holman, John Philip Kemble and Irish writer Arthur Murphy.

Henderson died intestate but his estate was estimated to be worth between £6,000 and £7,000. He had an extensive library of about 2,500 volumes and many prints. It was auctioned over six days (Monday to Saturday, 20–25 February 1786) by "T. and J. Egerton (Booksellers) at their Room at Scotland Yard". There were important collections within it, such as:

- Thirty volumes on Witchcraft and related topics, including A Candle in the Dark: Or, A Treatise Concerning the Nature of Witches & Witchcraft by Thomas Ady, and The admirable history of a magician who seduced a pious woman to become a witch.
- Seventy volumes on Theatrical History, Biography, Criticism and Controversy, including Memoirs of the life of David Garrick, Esq. by Thomas Davies (1780).
- Nearly 1,700 works on The English Theatre, including works by several women authors, such as Rival Widows, by Mrs. Eliz. Cooper and Albina, Countess Raimond by Mrs H Cowley.
- Four hundred prints, including 27 by Hogarth – such as "[a mezzotint] of Mr. Garrick in the Farmer's Return, a fine Proof, very scarce" – and 22 showing Garrick in character, e.g. as Abel Drugger in Jonson's The Alchemist.

=== Family ===
Henderson married Jane, daughter of Thomas Figgins jr, a successful clothier of Chippenham, on 13 January 1779 at St Clement Danes in London. Their only daughter Harriet was baptised on 18 November that year at St Martin-in-the-Fields. She married James Carrick Moore at St George's, Hanover Square on 31 December 1779; Moore was a surgeon and the brother and biographer of Lieutenant-General Sir John Moore of Corunna. A daughter of James Moore and Harriet Henderson was the artist Harriet Jane Moore.

A performance of Venice Preserv’d at the Theatre Royal Covent Garden on 25 February 1786 for the benefit of Mrs Henderson included a prologue spoken by Mrs Siddons, who also played Belvidera. Jane Henderson died in 1819 and was interred alongside her husband in Westminster Abbey.

== Sources ==
- "Henderson, John". Oxford Dictionary of National Biography (online ed.). Oxford University Press. doi:10.1093/ref:odnb/12910. (Subscription, Wikipedia Library access or UK public library membership required.)
- Lowndes, William (1982). The Theatre Royal at Bath. Redcliffe. ISBN 978-0905459493.
