= Shrewsbury bus station =

Transport hub in Shrewsbury, England

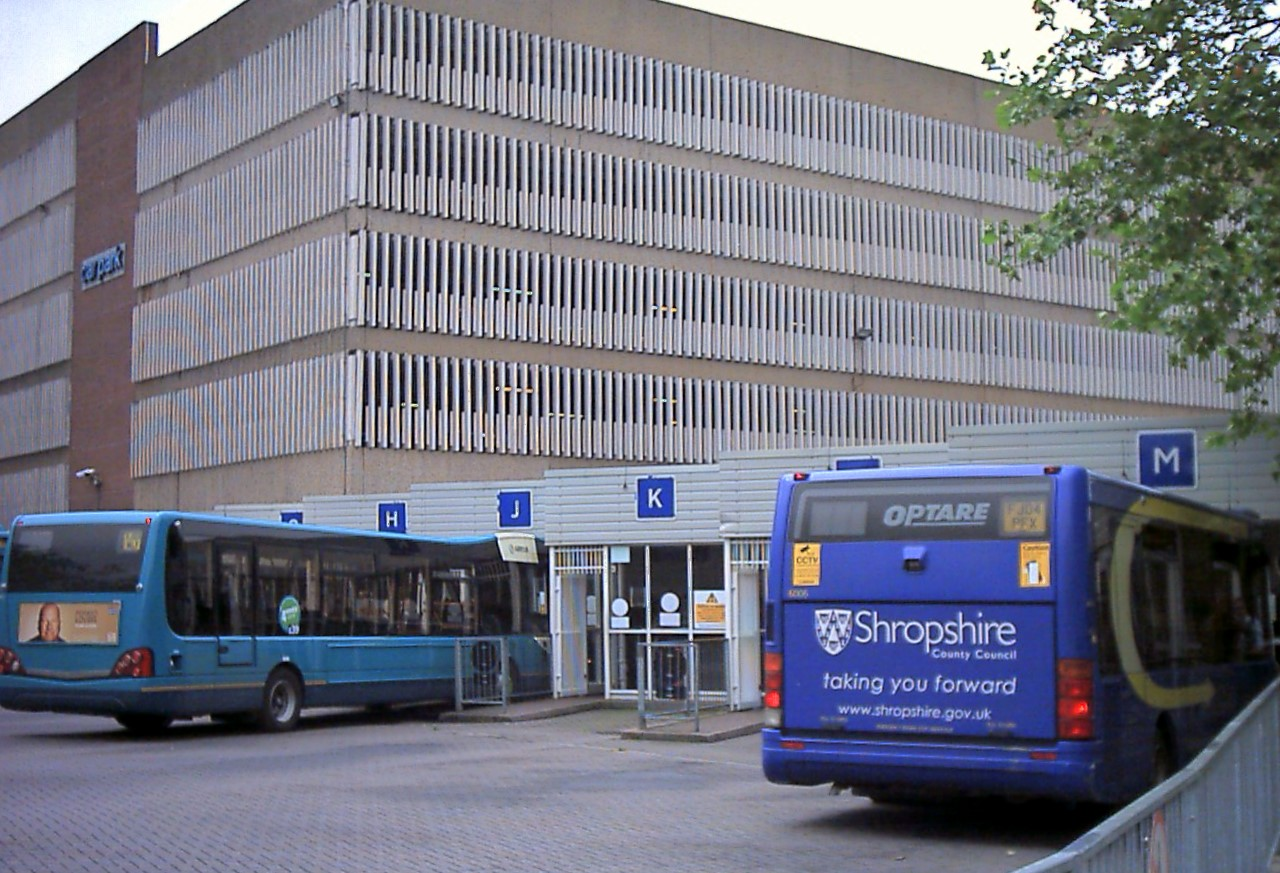
- The bus station in 2009

General information
- Location: Shrewsbury, Shropshire, England
- Coordinates: 52.71°N 2.75°W
- Operator: Shropshire Council
- Bus routes: 1, X5, X10, X11, 11, X12, 12, 17, 20, 21, 23, 24, 25, 26, 27, X48, 64, 74, 74A, X77, 96, 96A, 409, 435, 436, 437, 501, 511, 540, 552, 553, 558, 576, DRT
- Bus stands: 16
- Bus operators: Arriva Midlands North; Minsterley Motors; Tanat Valley Coaches; Lakeside Coaches; National Express; Hotspur; D&G Bus; Select Bus Services; Celtic Travel
- Connections: Shrewsbury railway station (0.1 mi)

Construction
- Structure type: At-grade
- Parking: Multi-Storey above Bus Station
- Cycle facilities: Yes
- Accessible: Yes

History
- Opened: 1989
Location
- Location within Shropshire

Shrewsbury bus station is a bus station and terminus located on Raven Meadows in the centre of Shrewsbury, the county town of Shropshire, England.

Local and inter-city services, predominantly operated by Arriva Midlands North, run from the station. Additional services are operated by Lakeside Coaches, Hotspur, D&G Bus, Tanat Valley, Select Bus Services, Celtic Travel and Minsterley Motors.

The station is connected to the Darwin Shopping Centre by an escalator and is adjacent to a Premier Inn hotel. Facilities include toilets, baby changing, a car park, a newsagent shop and a travel agent. It is also located 0.1 mi from Shrewsbury railway station.

The station is considered to be dated due to its 1980s architecture partially under a 1960s multi-storey car park. There have been plans for the station to be modernised and rebuilt, or even demolished completely, as part of the town's "Big Town Plan". The demolition of the station would mean the town would not have a central bus terminus and would instead use smaller sites on the town's Park and Ride routes.

== Routes ==
Route	Destination	Operator	Stand	Notes
1	Telford Estate	Arriva Midlands North	D	
2	Hawthorne Estate	Arriva Midlands North	B	Ceased operation on the 29th August 2026
3A	Monkmoor Circular via Belvidere, Harlescott and Sundorne	Arriva Midlands North	C	School days only, ended July 2026
X5	Oswestry via Bicton and Nesscliffe	Arriva Midlands North	G	
X10	Telford Centre fast via A5 and M54	Arriva Midlands North	H	
X11	Telford Centre via Wellington & A5	Arriva Midlands North	H	Limited service
11	Gains Park via Royal Shrewsbury Hospital	Arriva Midlands North	F	
X12	Newport via Wellington	Arriva Midlands North	S	Term Time only
12	Shelton via Radbrook	Arriva Midlands North	B	Ceased operation on the 29th August 2026
17	Sutton Farm Circular	Arriva Midlands North	H	
20	Radbrook Green	Hotspur	A	Began operation with Hotspur on the 1st September 2026
21	Reabrook via Old Potts Way	Lakeside Coaches	B	
23	Monkmoor via Abbey Foregate	Hotspur	M	Began operation with Hotspur on the 1st September 2026
24	Harlescott via Sundorne	Arriva Midlands North	J	
25	Harlescott via Mount Pleasant	Arriva Midlands North	J	
26	Meole Village via Kingsland	Hotspur	M	Began operation with Hotspur on the 1st September 2026
27	Bayston Hill via Meole Brace	Arriva Midlands North	E	
X48	Builth Wells via Church Stretton, Craven Arms, Knighton and Llandrindod Wells	Celtic Travel	P	Limited service
64	Market Drayton via Shawbury and Hodnet	Hotspur and D&G Bus	K	Some buses continue to Hanley via Newcastle-under-Lyme, Began operation with Hotspur on the 1st September 2026
74	Llanfyllin via Llanymynech	Tanat Valley Coaches	N	Some buses terminate at Llanymynech
X77	Newtown via Middletown and Welshpool	Tanat Valley Coaches		Some buses terminate at Welshpool
96	Telford Centre via Ironbridge	Select Bus Services	S	
96A	Telford Centre via Ironbridge	Select Bus Services	S	Also Serves Madeley
409	London Victoria via Digbeth	National Express	S	
409	Aberystwyth via Welshpool and Newtown	National Express	S	
435	Ludlow via Leebotwood and Church Stretton	Minsterley Motors	N	
436	Bridgnorth	Select Bus Services	P	
437	Broseley via Much Wenlock	Arriva Midlands North	P	
501	Ellesmere via Myddle	Lakeside Coaches	P	
511	Whitchurch via Clive and Wem	Arriva Midlands North	L	Some buses terminate at Wem
512	Whitchurch via Wem	Arriva Midlands North	L	Does not serve Clive
540	Cardington via Acton Burnell and Church Stretton	Minsterley Motors	N	Limited service
552	Stiperstones via Pontesbury and Minsterley	Minsterley Motors	N	
553	Bishop's Castle via Pontesbury and Minsterley	Minsterley Motors	N	
558	Montgomery via Worthen	Hotspur	R	Began operation with Hotspur on the 1st September 2026
576	Oswestry via Baschurch	Tanat Valley Coaches	R	Some buses terminate at Baschurch
DRT	DRT Zones 1 and 2	Shropshire Council	C	Launched in 2024
