= Suburbs of Shrewsbury =

Suburbs of Shrewsbury refers to residential areas within the town of Shrewsbury, Shropshire, England. Many had been separate villages until the growth of the town.

North: Coton Hill Greenfields; Herongate Ditherington; Castlefields; Sundorne; Harlescott; Heathgates; Mount Pleasant; Battlefield; Bagley West: Frankwell; Copthorne; Porthill; Kingsland; Gains Park; Radbrook Green; Shelton	East: Abbey Foregate; Underdale; Cherry Orchard; Telford Estate; Monkmoor; Belvidere South: Coleham; Sutton Farm; Reabrook; Sutton Park; Meole Brace; Meole Village; Belle Vue
