= Bus transport in Wales =

Overview of buses in Wales

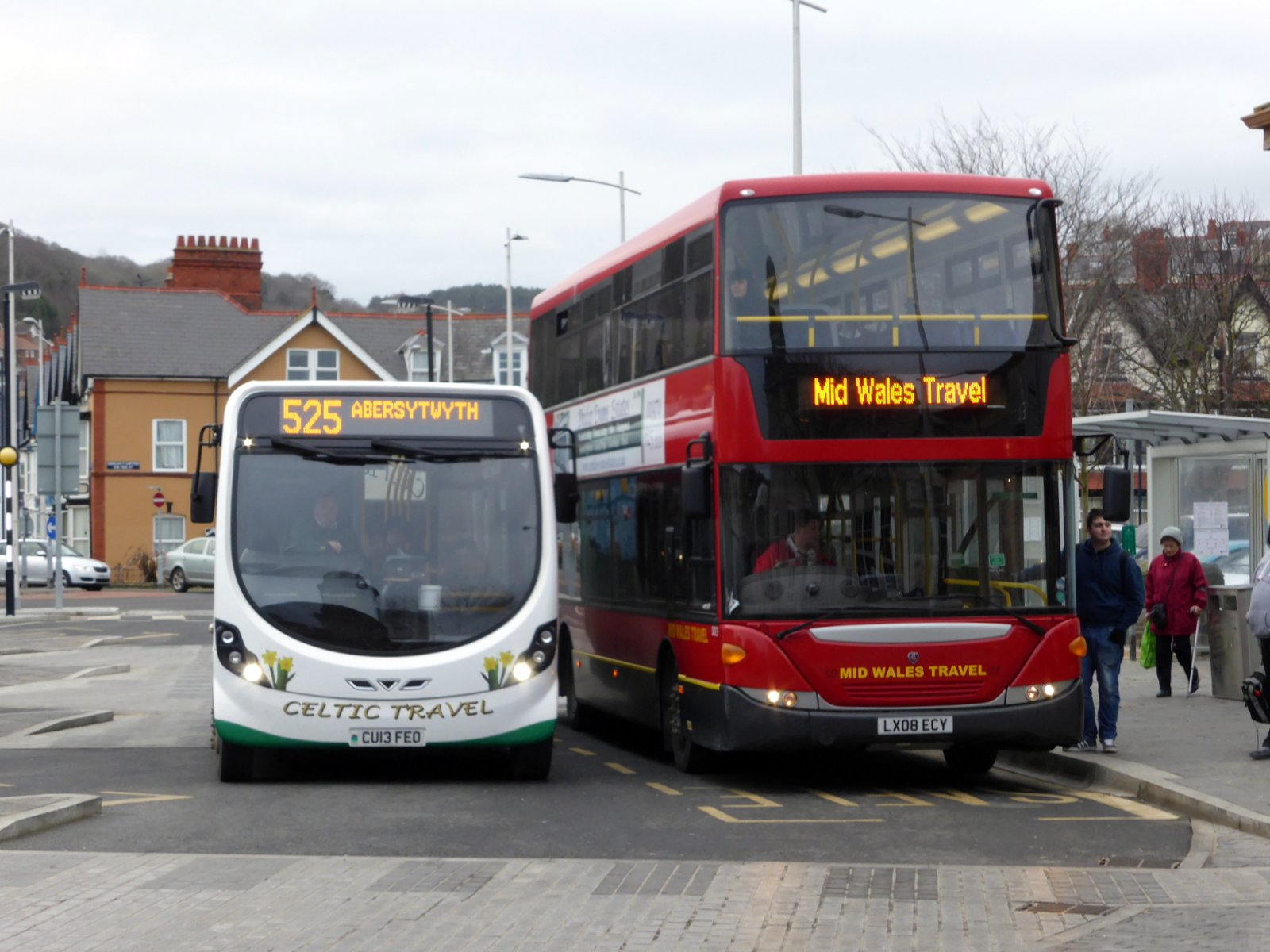
Celtic and Mid Wales Travel buses at Aberystwyth bus station in 2015

Bus transport in Wales is a significant form of public transport in Wales. In 2021–22 52.3 million journeys were travelled in Wales on local buses.

== History ==
In 1845, the first recorded horse-drawn bus services occurred in Cardiff.

In 1870, the Cardiff Tramways Company was established and later ran horse trams and buses.

By 1902, the Corporation of Cardiff had taken over the Cardiff Tramways Company, and had commenced operating electric powered trams in the city.

On 2 May 1914, South Wales Transport commenced their first bus services, with the company providing connecting bus services in Swansea to the Swansea Improvements and Tramway Company.

In 1921, Tanat Valley Coaches was founded.

In the early 20th century motor buses had some operations in Cardiff, although these early buses were described to be uncomfortable, with the pneumatic tyres not being introduced until 1924, and the closing of open top-decks with the first roofs until 1925.

In 1937, motor buses replaced trams in Swansea. In 1942, trolleybuses were introduced in Cardiff, including both single-deck and double-deckers.

In 1943, a pay-as-you go enter system replaced fare-collecting conductors on Cardiff's buses. While in May that year, Richards Brothers operated its first bus.

In 1950, trams stopped operating in Cardiff.

In 1958, Richards Brothers bought Owen Williams of Cardigan, while South Wales Transport bought the Swansea and Mumbles Railway, an electric tram service which was closed in 1960.

Starting in 1962, motor buses were introduced in Cardiff, phasing out the use of trolleybuses which were last operated until 1970.

On 1 January 1969, South Wales Transport became part of the National Bus Company. The National Bus Company operated a subsidiary known as Crosville, operating services across North and Mid Wales and Cheshire in England.

In 1971, Western Welsh withdrew from parts of West Wales and Richards Brothers took over the services between Fishguard and St. Davids. In 1972, Richard Brothers bought Lewis Williams (Blue Glider) of St. Dogmaels and in 1976 Pioneer Motors of Newport. In 1978, it expanded its facilities in Newport to accommodate an increase in local services there, and in 1982, the company bought a depot in Haverfordwest for an increase in that area's services.

In May 1987, the National Bus Company was undergoing privatisation, with South Wales Transport and Crosville sold to management buyouts.

In 1989, National Express bought Crosville Wales, but then Drawlane (to be British Bus) bought Crosville in 1991.

Following the formation of FirstBus in 1995, its Welsh operations were rebranded as First Cymru.

In 2002, Arriva Cymru, formed from the purchase of Crosville, merged with Arriva North West (England), but was demerged into Arriva Buses Wales in 2009.

In 2008, Adventure Travel, then New Adventure Travel, launched in South Wales. It was acquired by ComfortDelGro in 2018.

In July 2016, GHA Coaches, Wales' largest independent bus operator which operates in North East Wales, English West Midlands and North West England, went into administration.

=== Under devolution ===
In 2018, a study suggested that the distance travelled by bus in Wales had declined by 20% from 2006–2007 to 2016–2017, the most of the UK nations, and that the miles covered with financial support from local authorities had almost halved. The Welsh Local Government Association stated the findings "undermine[d] the case for continued financial support for non-commercial services". The Welsh Government described the findings as "misleading", as the study did not consider the impact of an increase in train journeys and excluded the long-distance TrawsCymru bus services.

In July 2018, it was claimed by the Campaign for Better Transport that council funding for buses had been cut across England and Wales, with council funding for buses in Wales cut around 40 per cent from 2010–11 to 2017–18.

==== Bus Services (Wales) Bill ====
In July 2019, the Welsh Government aimed to restructure the bus industry in Wales to introduce a "London-style system" where bus operators would bid to operate services, compared to the current system where aside subsidising unprofitable routes, bus firms have large amounts of leeway to decide what routes to run.

The Bus Services (Wales) Bill, was introduced by the Welsh Government as a white paper, which aimed to provided local authorities more "tools" to use in the planning and delivery of bus services within their local jurisdictions, and the improve the availability of bus service information. It would've created "Welsh Partnership Schemes" consisting of bus operators and the authorities, and allow local authorities to run their own bus services. Local councils would have the power to award bus firms exclusive rights to particular routes and prevent other operators from competing on the same routes. Although this would effectively mean councils would fund bus operators using contracts that dictate what routes bus firms should run.

Welsh ministers had stated as a lot of existing bus funded was with public funding it should be with more public control. It was compared to the franchising system in London, which unlike other parts of the UK had seen bus usage rise, and that the deregulation of the bus system had led to a suspected "lot of waste in the system".

There were concerns the legislation may put some bus firms out of business, and bus firms opposed the legislation during a public consultation, arguing it was unnecessarily expensive and poor value. Charity Bus Users UK opposed the plans, and stated the franchising model was unsustainable as it requires ongoing public investment, with the Public Transport Consortium stating the system does not address the issue of a lack of funds of councils, and would stifle innovation, restrict private investment and could lead to bus firms, who are unable to secure contracts, to have their employee pay and pensions susceptible to failure. It was withdrawn in July 2020, in response to the COVID-19 pandemic.

In July 2020, Gwynedd Council published a "2020 North Wales Regional Bus Strategy".

=== Other recent history ===
In March 2022, the Welsh Government proposed changing the structure of the bus system in Wales into a single franchising system and network styled Bws Cymru (Welsh for 'Bus Wales'), an equivalent to London Buses. The white paper proposed establishing one ticketing system, one timetable and one operator, with private firms bidding to run services, while Welsh Ministers held a larger say in the management of the system. A 12-week consultation was launched following the announcement, and the government would introduce a law to franchise all bus services in Wales. The proposed system differs from England and Scotland, where local authorities command more control, although the Welsh Government also announced it intends lift the ban on allowing local authorities to set up new publicly owned bus companies.

In November 2022, First Cymru simplified its "Tap On-Tap Off" fare capping service in Bridgend County Borough where adult customer fares would be calculated based on the direct distance travelled by the customer.

On 11 February 2023, the Welsh Government's Bus Emergency Scheme was extended for three months until June 2023. The scheme aimed to mitigate the impact of the COVID-19 pandemic in Wales on the bus industry. The Welsh Government later confirmed that it would not extend the scheme further. The termination of the scheme would potentially lead to cuts to bus services in Wales, and not all them can be funded. Llyr Gruffydd MS criticised the cuts, stating it would leave the poorest and most vulnerable people isolated.

In March 2023, the Coach and Bus Association Cymru warned that the cuts must be averted for the Welsh Government to meet its long-term policy for the future of the network, and argued there were medium-term solutions to avoid the threat of a "skeleton" network. While two Labour council leaders stated the cuts would be "devastating".

In April 2023, the Welsh Government extended the scheme for three more weeks from the initial June deadline, now lasting till 24 July. A May 2023 committee was held over concerns of the end of the scheme, and it was argued "modest additional funding" would protect services till March 2024.

On 23 May 2023, the Welsh Government offered an additional £20 million to the industry but stated it would not be enough to cover all services at risk of cutting.

On 30 June 2026, the Welsh Government announced that a new coach service would be launched between Carmarthen and Bangor, it will reduce journey time by over an hour. It was latter revealed that the service will be called TaithCymru and daily services would start from 25 October 2026.

== Services ==
Bus and coach services are regulated by the Transport Act 1985, Transport Act 2000 and Transport (Wales) Act 2006. The Welsh Ministers do not have any powers in relation to UK-wide regulatory regime of the bus industry.

=== Statistics ===
Local bus services can be a "vital part of Welsh economic and social life" for the 19 per cent of the population of Wales recorded to not have access to a car or van in the 2021 United Kingdom census, where bus services may be relied on to travelling to work, hospital, social activities, shopping or leisure.

During the 2021–22 period between 1 April 2021 and 31 March 2022, 52.3 million passenger journeys on local buses on a total of 82.8 million vehicle kilometres were undertaken in Wales. The passenger journeys figure is an increase from 25.9 million in 2020–21, but 43 per cent lower than the last year prior to the COVID-19 pandemic in Wales, with 91.0 million in 2019–20. Journeys per person and vehicle kilometres on local buses were lower in Wales compared to Scotland and England, all three have seen a general trend of declining journeys since 2009.

Of the total 82.8 million vehicle kilometre-distance travelled, 75.8 per cent were on commercial routes, with the remaining 24 per cent on subsidised services. The figure is an overall increase of 27.9 per cent from the 2020–21 figure, with commercial services increasing by 31.2 per cent and subsidised by 26.9 per cent, and the increases may be a result of relaxing restrictions implemented during the COVID-19 pandemic. Although the distance travelled has been overall slightly declining since 2009–10.

The Welsh Government defines local bus services as those where passengers can get off within 15 miles from their pick up point and while using separate fares.

For 2021–22, there were 2,934 bus and coach drivers in Wales, a decrease of 10.6 per cent from 2020–21, and part of a general decrease over the past four years. Although the number of local bus and coach vehicles increased by 1.1 per cent in the same period (2021–22) to 2,215 vehicles, although lower than a decade earlier in 2011–12.

=== Operators ===
==== National ====
===== TrawsCymru =====
TrawsCymru are a set of routes, set up by the Welsh Government but operated by private bus companies using the TrawsCymru branding. This service is similar to a previous service, TrawsCambria. The network is planned to be entirely zero-emission by 2026. Between July 2017 and May 2018, all TrawsCymru services on weekends were free.

===== Fflecsi =====
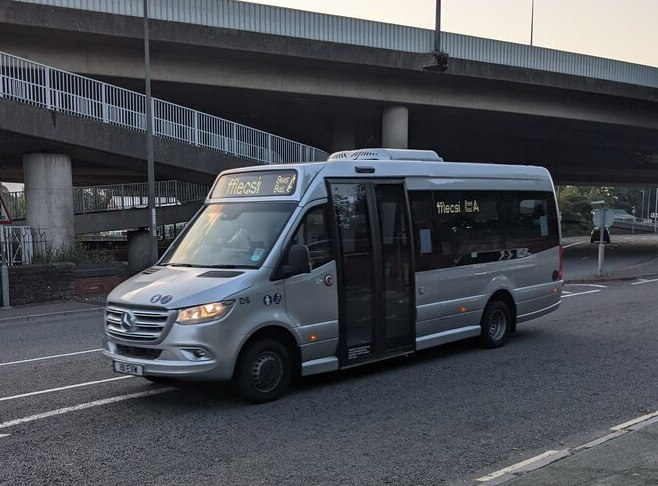
Fflecsi minibus on Malpas Road, Newport, in August 2021 for Newport's pilot service

In May 2020, Transport for Wales launched a trial demand-responsive bus service, named "fflecsi", which was operated by local bus operators across Wales. By the beginning of September 2020, fflecsi had recorded over 7,000 journeys on its service since its launch in mid-May 2020. The largest pilot of the service commenced in Newport, South Wales, with up to 48% of all fflecsi journeys being in the city in September 2020. The Newport pilot service ended on 25 September 2022. From May 2020 to May 2021, it had recorded 50,000 trips on its then seven pilot services across Wales, with four being single bus routes.

==== UK-wide ====
- National Express operate largely west-east services in Wales. They operate services along the North Wales coast to Holyhead, Llandudno, Colwyn Bay and Abergele. A Mid Wales service from England to Aberystwyth, passing Welshpool, Newtown, and Llanidloes. For South Wales, they operate services to Newport, Cardiff, Sarn (Bridgend), Port Talbot, Swansea, Llanelli, Carmarthen and destinations in Pembrokeshire. They also operate services to Wrexham.

==== Local ====
This is a list of the major local bus operators in Wales, not all small local operators are included:

- Adventure Travel — operate services across Cardiff, Newport, Pontypridd, Swansea, Bridgend, Vale of Glamorgan and Monmouthshire, mostly comprising South East Wales. They also operate Rail linc routes in the area.
- Arriva Buses Wales — operate services across North Wales. Including the first UK Arriva Sapphire service launched in Wrexham in 2013.
- Cardiff Bus — operate services in Cardiff and Vale of Glamorgan
- Llew Jones — operate services in North Wales.
- Lloyds Coaches — operate services in North and Mid Wales, mainly in Gwynedd and northern Ceredigion. They operate their local buses in Meirionnydd, connecting Barmouth, Blaenau Ffestiniog, Dolgellau, and Tywyn. Lloyds also operate TrawsCymru services, including the T2 Bangor to Aberystwyth, T3 Barmouth to Wrexham, and the T12 Machynlleth to Wrexham service via Welshpool, Newtown and Oswestry (England).
- First Cymru — operate services in South West Wales, in and around Bridgend, Cardiff, Carmarthen, Haverfordwest, Llanelli, Maesteg, Neath, Pembroke, Pontardawe, Port Talbot, Swansea and Tenby. They also operated a "Swansea Metro"–branded bus rapid transit route in Swansea, and the X10 Swansea–Cardiff service and "Cymru Clipper" network between Carmarthen and Cardiff.
- Harris Coaches — operate services in Caerphilly County Borough.
- Newport Bus — operate services in Newport, and connecting services to Cardiff, Cwmbran in Torfaen, and Monmouthshire.
- Richards Brothers — operate services in Ceredigion, Pembrokeshire and Carmarthenshire.
- Stagecoach South Wales — operate services in South East Wales, including in Blaenau Gwent, Bridgend, Caerphilly, Cardiff, Merthyr Tydfil, Neath Port Talbot, Newport, Monmouthshire, Powys, Rhondda Cynon Taf, Swansea and Torfaen as well as services into Herefordshire in England.
- Sherpa'r Wyddfa, formerly the Snowdon Sherpa, is a bus service operating around Snowdonia (Eryri) in Northern Gwynedd, connecting Bangor, Beddgelert, Betws-y-Coed, Caernarfon and Porthmadog.
- Tanat Valley Coaches — operate services in northern Powys and into Shropshire in England.

=== Other passenger services ===
==== Private uses ====
Private use of bus transport in Wales encompasses tour buses, vehicles for hire, and holiday excursions/package tours.

Local operators providing tourist bus and coach services include Edwards Coaches, Richards Brothers and Leisuretime.

Sightseeing buses are present in Cardiff, Llandudno & Conwy, and Porthcawl. A similar sightseeing "picturesque" minibus service is provided in the Dee Valley (along the River Dee). There is a vintage bus tour in Llandudno.

Coastal buses operate in Pembrokeshire Coast National Park, with more services in the summer, while retaining a limited service in the winter.

In May 2022, The Borrow Bus was launched as a pilot in North East Wales, providing equipment available to be borrowed by residents as well as a destination for donations by residents which may have otherwise gone to waste. It aims to save money, reduce clutter in households and help the environment.

== Preservation and manufacturing ==
Swansea Bus Museum restores, displays and operates buses formerly operated around Swansea by public transport companies in South and West Wales. The museum's collection mainly consists of buses operated by South Wales Transport and First Cymru, as well as two London Transport Routemasters and other motor vehicles.

Between the 1930s and late 1940s the bus manufacturer Associated Equipment Company (AEC) was the preferred bus manufacturer for operators in Cardiff.

For their electric bus fleets, Cardiff Bus and Newport Bus had purchased electric buses from Chinese manufacturer Yutong. Lee Waters, deputy minister for climate change, stated such buses should be made in Wales rather than imported. UK manufacturer Switch Mobility had stated they had proposed an electric bus factory in Wales but it received "no traction". In March 2023, new Pelican-provided Yutong electric buses for TrawsCymru were unveiled by Waters.

== Infrastructure ==
While "driver-only" buses were first operated in 1923, its large-scale introduction only occurred until the 1970s in Cardiff, with full implementation by 1980.

Traveline Cymru works in partnership with Wales' public transport operators and local authorities to provide public transport information to passengers.

In May 2023, Transport for Wales announced it would use artificial intelligence, cloud computing, optimising algorithms and rapid scenario generation, and using demographic data to make Wales' bus services more efficient and sustainable.

The former Cardiff Central bus station was the largest bus station in Cardiff and Wales until its closure in 2015.

=== Bus rapid transit systems ===
Ftrmetro Swansea was a bus rapid transit route in Swansea, where it ultilised dedicated busways, bus lanes and articulated buses. It launched in September 2009, but First Cymru removed the service in 2015, due to rising costs. The service was replaced with standard bus services, and a change of route to enable redevelopment. When it launched, the service included a mile-long roadway parallel to a railway line, known as the "Landore express busway".

As part of the South Wales Metro, bus rapid transit routes are being considered for Cardiff. Cardiff council had published a plan for a £30 million cross-city tram-bus rapid transit in 2011.

== Other bus transport services ==
=== Bus passes ===
Transport for Wales (TfW) offers a bus passes for free bus travel to the disabled, those aged 60 or over, and injured service personnel. TfW also offers a "PlusBus", a discounted bus pass purchased alongside a train ticket, which provides unlimited bus travel around the urban area of one of the 26 towns or cities served on TfW's network in Wales and the bordering regions of England.

MyTravelPass is offered to those living in Wales aged 16–21, giving a third of their bus fare off.

Between 26 March 2022 and 24 July 2023, the Welsh Government offered free bus travel to refugees on local bus services and Transport for Wales-operated bus services wholly within Wales.

=== Ticketing ===
Some services in Wales offer Multi-operator tickets.

A "Tap On Tap Off" ticketing system is in operation in Cardiff by Cardiff Bus, multiple operators in North Wales including Arriva Cymru, in Bridgend by First Cymru, and Stagecoach South Wales.

On 23 February 2023, Rhondda Cynon Taf County Borough Council announced they planned to offer free bus services throughout March 2023.

In May 2023, Swansea Council announced plans for free resident bus travel during the summer, Christmas, and Easter school holidays, to help residents during the cost-of-living crisis.

For the 2021–22 period, fares in Wales remained constant, compared to the average increase of 3.3. per cent across Great Britain, and remaining lower than the GB average overall.

=== Park and ride ===
Cardiff, the capital, currently operates 4 sites in north, south, east and west of the city. Cardiff East has services to University Hospital Wales, while the council also provides temporary park and ride services during events or for shoppers on weekends and bank holidays.

In Swansea, in the south west of the country, FirstCymru operates park and ride services to its city centre from 2 sites, Fabian Way and Landore, as of June 2023.

There are park and ride options in Snowdonia (Eryri), such as the national park authority-operated facility in Nant Peris.

There is a summer free park and ride service in Tenby, initially running between July and September, but was expanded to some dates in May and June in 2021.

Aberystwyth, in Mid Wales, had its own scheme until April 2016. While in Carmarthen, in South West Wales, FirstCymru operated a scheme between Nant Y Ci, Glangwili General Hospital and the town centre, until June 2023, when the council removed the service due to low passenger use.

== Fleet ==
Traditionally buses in Cardiff were crimson and cream, until the 1970s when they became orange and white, and green in 1999. Cardiff also had bendybuses introduced in 2006. The minibus was widely introduced to Cardiff in the 1980s, with its clipper buses being present across the city.

=== Zero emission ===
The Welsh Government plans for the TrawsCymru network to be entirely zero-emission by 2026, 50% of the most-polluting buses to be replaced by zero-emission in 2028, and all by 2035.

However, by February 2022, Wales had no Government-run fund to help bus operators deal with the costs of green vehicles and infrastructure, unlike England and Scotland. The Welsh Government said a scheme was being developed for 2022.

In January 2022, Cardiff Bus revealed its new 36 electric zero-emission buses, making almost a quarter of its entire fleet. This followed the first introduction of electric buses in Cardiff in 2018.

The first permanent electric bus in service was in Newport in 2019.

== See also ==
- List of bus stations in Wales
- Bus transport in the United Kingdom
- Coach transport in the United Kingdom
- Transport in the United Kingdom
