= Bernard McNally =

Northern Irish footballer and manager

Personal information
- Full name: Bernard Anthony McNally
- Date of birth: 17 February 1963 (age 63)
- Place of birth: Shrewsbury, England
- Height: 5 ft 7 in (1.70 m)
- Position: Midfielder

Senior career*
Years	Team	Apps	(Gls)
1980–1989	Shrewsbury Town	279	(23)
1989–1995	West Bromwich Albion	156	(10)
1996–1998	Hednesford Town	43	(3)
- Telford United

International career
1986–1988	Northern Ireland	5	(0)

Managerial career
- 2004–2006: A.F.C. Telford United
- 2008: Pune FC
- 2009–2010: Hednesford Town
- 2011–2013: Newtown
- 2013–2014: Shrewsbury Town (coach)
- 2014–2015: Port Talbot Town
- 2015: Hednesford Town
- * Club domestic league appearances and goals

Bernard Anthony McNally (born 17 February 1963) is a former Northern Ireland international footballer who played in midfield.

During his club career he played for Shrewsbury Town (1980–1989), West Bromwich Albion (1989–1995), Hednesford Town (1996–1998), and Telford United. He earned five caps for the Northern Ireland national football team from 1986 to 1988, and was included in the 1986 FIFA World Cup team.

== Playing career ==
McNally grew up in the Ditherington area of Shrewsbury, and was a pupil at the Harlescott Grange School. He was signed as a professional by his hometown club Shrewsbury Town, on the eve of the 1981/82 season, and immediately established himself as a first team member in arguably one of the best ever Shrewsbury Town sides. McNally was one of the key Shrewsbury players during their spell in the old Second Division, as Shrewsbury established themselves as Second Division regulars during the mid-80s, and made a total of 284 Football League appearances for Shrewsbury, though it was once said he should be sold and someone else just as good should be bought.

In July 1989, McNally was sold for £385,000 (following a tribunal) to West Bromwich Albion, following talks with both Stoke City and Sunderland. McNally had a successful stint at West Brom, in only his first year at the club he was voted Supporter's Player of the season in 1989/90. Arguably the highlight of his time at The Hawthorns being a member of the squad that won the 1993 Second Division playoffs.

He was unable to command a regular first team place later in his West Brom career, and so made a switch to another West Midlands team, Hednesford Town, in 1996. Hednesford were enjoying a successful spell in the Football Conference, and the experienced Football League veteran was a hit with the Hednesford fans. Arguably the highlight of McNally's Hednesford career was the team's 1996/97 FA Cup run, in which the team reached the fourth round, facing Middlesbrough F.C. at the Riverside Stadium. After taking an early lead in front of a 28,000 crowd, Hednesford were unlucky to lose 3–2, with McNally playing an important role.

After playing for Hednesford, he played briefly at Telford United before retiring as a player

== Managerial career ==
In 2004, one of McNally's former clubs Telford United, went bust following the demise of chairman Andy Shaw's business empire. Despite being unable to save the club, Telford supporters founded a new club, AFC Telford United, playing in the Northern Premier League's First Division. McNally was appointed as the club's first manager, and quickly built up a squad. Despite some early indifferent form, McNally's side soon rose up the table, eventually finishing third in the league and qualifying for the play-offs. Telford were to beat Kendal Town 2–1 in the playoff final, in front of a league record crowd of 4.215 at the New Bucks Head.

Telford struggled in their opening season in the Northern Premier League. With the club second from bottom midway through the season, and following considerable pressure from fans, McNally was sacked, later to be replaced by Willenhall's Rob Smith. Despite the setback, McNally stated in a later radio interview for BBC Radio Shropshire that whilst disappointed, he had no hard feelings towards the club, and was proud to have managed them.

McNally is currently involved in football coaching, and is still remembered with great affection by fans at Shrewsbury Town. To that effect he was invited to be part of the Shrewsbury Town 'Legends' who paraded the pitch at Gay Meadow prior to the ground's final League fixture against Grimsby Town on 5 May 2007.

McNally was appointed by Indian club, Pune FC as head coach in February 2008, a post he held until May 2008.

In September 2009 he was appointed as Caretaker Manager of Southern League Premier Division side Hednesford Town. The club had struggled in the first half of their season under former first team manager Simon Lines, therefore McNally had to work quickly to get the club back on track. Success saw the club finish 4th earning a playoff position. Hednesford Town lost in the play-off semi-finals to Chippenham Town. He was manager until September 2010.

In June 2011 he was appointed as manager by Welsh Premier League club Newtown In 2011/12 Newtown went to the league cup final, but lost the match on penalties. The 2012/13 season was mixed for McNally and Newtown, as they kept their league status for another season. That season Newtown beat Bangor City at home and beat The New Saints at Park Hall for the first time in 11 years. In the season of 2013/14, McNally saw his Newtown team play some great football, but it was announced that he was to leave the club to take a coaching roll at former club Shrewsbury Town F.C. McNally's final match was a 2–0 win against Port Talbot Town, which left Newtown in 5th place in the early season table. Bernie was given a very good send off from the club as the fans and staff were all grateful of the work he had done with a very small budget.

On 6 September 2015, it was announced that McNally would take over the managerial position at Hednesford Town FC.

On 15 December 2016, McNally was sacked.

== Honours ==
West Bromwich Albion

- Football League Second Division play-offs: 1993
