= Steve Leslie (footballer, born 1987) =

Scottish footballer

Steven Leslie
Personal information
- Full name: Steven William Leslie
- Date of birth: 5 November 1987 (age 39)
- Place of birth: Glasgow, Scotland
- Positions: Fullback; midfielder

Team information
- Current team: Grantham Town

Youth career
- –2006: Shrewsbury Town

Senior career*
Years	Team	Apps	(Gls)
2006−2012	Shrewsbury Town	103	(7)
2011	→ Hereford United (loan)	11	(2)
2011	→ Hereford United (loan)	10	(2)
2012	Wrexham	13	(1)
2012−2013	AFC Telford United	39	(4)
2013−2014	Worcester City	16	(1)
2014	Worcester City	2	(0)
2014−2015	Rushall Olympic		
2015−2016	Solihull Moors	11	(2)
2016	Sutton Coldfield Town		
2016−2018	Corby Town		
2018−2019	Newtown	30	(7)
2019−2022	Bala Town	43	(4)
2022–	Grantham Town	8	(2)
- * Club domestic league appearances and goals as of 20:56, 28 April 2022 (UTC+1)

Steven William Leslie (born 5 November 1987) is a Scottish born footballer who plays for Grantham Town. He is predominantly a left-sided midfielder. He has had spells in the English lower leagues, playing for teams including Shrewsbury Town and Hereford United.

== Career ==
=== Shrewsbury Town ===
Despite being born in Glasgow, he moved to Shrewsbury as a child and attended Sundorne School in the suburb of Sundorne. He made his debut for Shrewsbury Town on 18 April 2006 as an 83rd-minute substitute in the 4–1 win over Rushden & Diamonds. This was his sole appearance in the 2005–06 season. At the end of the season, two years into his three-year scholarship programme, he was handed a one-year professional contract.

He played seven times in 2006–07, and sat on the bench for the League Two playoff final at Wembley. In July 2007, he signed a new one-year contract.

Leslie scored his first senior goal for Shrewsbury on the opening day of 2007–08, scoring late in the match as the Shrews out 4–0 winners against Lincoln City at Sincil Bank. In February 2008 he signed a contract extension to keep him at the club until the summer of 2009. He made a total of 21 appearances over the course of the season, and started to establish himself within the first team.

The following season Leslie made 33 appearances, but was sent off in the League Two playoff semi-final against Bury. This meant that he missed the final at Wembley. At the end of the season he signed a new two-year contract.

In 2009–10 Leslie found some goalscoring form, as he scored six times in 35 appearances. The following season, after finding first team opportunities limited, he joined Hereford United for a month's loan on 17 March 2011 this was later extended until the end of the season based on his performances, including a goal against league leaders Chesterfield in a 3–0 win. He then returned to Shrewsbury for their League Two play-off campaign, making a cameo off the bench in the semi-final second leg game against Torquay United.

=== Non-league ===
On 27 January 2012 Leslie left Shrewsbury by mutual consent and joined Conference side Wrexham, becoming Andy Morrell's first signing since he was appointed manager. After only managing 13 league appearances and one goal he was then released by Wrexham in the summer of 2012. On 7 August 2012 he joined AFC Telford United. He made his debut against Barrow, where he played 90mins in a 0–0 draw.

In July 2013, he joined Torquay United on trial, but failed to earn a contract.

Leslie joined Worcester City in November 2013, but left in March 2014 having deciding to emigrate to Australia. where he became a coach.

In September 2014, after returning to the UK, he re-signed for former club Worcester City, and later that year moved on to Rushall Olympic.

Leslie joined Solihull Moors ahead of the 2015−16 season, helping them to the National League North title.

Steve then joined Sutton Coldfield Town on 2 September 2016. before moving on to Northern Premier League Premier Division side Corby Town in November 2016.

=== Welsh Premier League ===
Leslie joined Welsh Premier League side Newtown in July 2018, following a successful trial. He moved on to Bala Town in July 2019.

On 4 February 2022, Leslie signed for Northern Premier League Premier Division side Grantham Town.
