= 2009 Shropshire Council election =

2009 UK local government election

The 2009 elections to Shropshire Council in England were held on 4 June 2009. These were the first elections to the new unitary body, which replaced Shropshire County Council and the district councils of Bridgnorth, North Shropshire, Oswestry, Shrewsbury and Atcham and South Shropshire on 1 April as part of the 2009 local government restructuring across England.

The vote was moved from 7 May to coincide with the European Parliament elections that year.

Counting took place on 5 June at the Sundorne Sports Village in north Shrewsbury. The count was delayed by around 5 hours, resulting in Shropshire being the last local council to declare results in the 2009 local elections.

In total, 74 councillors were elected from 63 newly formed electoral divisions (53 single member divisions, nine 2-member divisions and one 3-member electoral division). The Conservatives won overall control, with 54 councillors elected resulting in a substantial majority of 34. The Liberal Democrats came second with 11 councillors elected, and Labour third with 7 councillors. In addition, the Independent Community and Health Concern candidate in Cleobury Mortimer and one independent candidate were also elected.

Average voter turnout was 42.5% across Shropshire.

Because of the council's unitary status, all divisions are up for election at once, every four years. The next Shropshire Council election took place on 2 May 2013.

== Results ==
Comparisons made against the results of the 2005 election.

| Political party | Candidates | Seats won | % | ±% | Votes | % | +/- | ±% |
|---|---|---|---|---|---|---|---|---|
| Conservatives | **74** | **54** | **73.8** | **+21.8** | **60,334** | **48.8** | | |
| Liberal Democrats | 46 | 11 | 14.9 | -8.1 | 26,932 | 21.8 | | |
| Labour | 28 | 7 | 7.5 | -11.5 | 15,584 | 12.6 | | |
| ICHC | 1 | 1 | 1.4 | | 1,454 | 1.2 | | |
| Independents | 30 | 1 | 1.4 | | 14,016 | 11.3 | | |
| Greens | 13 | 0 | 0.0 | | 2,903 | 2.3 | | |
| BNP | 10 | 0 | 0.0 | | 1,764 | 1.4 | | |
| UKIP | 3 | 0 | 0.0 | | 714 | 0.6 | | |
| Albion | 1 | 0 | 0.0 | | 57 | 0.05 | | |

Conservative majority: 34.

=== Central area results ===
Following are the results for the electoral divisions located in the Central administrative sub-division of Shropshire Council, which covers the area of the former Shrewsbury and Atcham borough. Unless otherwise stated, all divisions elect a single member. The winning candidates are marked in bold.

==== Abbey ====
| Candidate | Political party | Votes | % |
|---|---|---|---|
| **Josephine Jones** | Conservatives | 637 | 49.4 |
| Caroline Mary Cheyne | Liberal Democrats | 383 | 29.7 |
| John Olaf Lewis | Labour and Co-operative | 269 | 20.9 |

Turnout: 35.1%

==== Bagley ====
| Candidate | Political party | Votes | % |
|---|---|---|---|
| **Beverley Joy Baker** | Liberal Democrats | 705 | 58.5 |
| David Stanley Farmer | Conservatives | 500 | 41.5 |

Turnout: 38.14%

==== Battlefield ====
| Candidate | Political party | Votes | % |
|---|---|---|---|
| **Malcolm Thomas Price** | Conservatives | 523 | 62.0 |
| Ian Francis Peake | Labour | 184 | 21.8 |
| Christine Patricia Lord | Independent | 136 | 16.1 |

Turnout: 31.23%

==== Bayston Hill, Column and Sutton ====
Bayston Hill, Column and Sutton is a three-member division, with voters able to cast three separate votes in the election. In 2009, all three Labour candidates topped the vote, resulting in them being elected.

| Candidate | Political party | Votes | % |
|---|---|---|---|
| **John Edward Clarke** | Labour | 2,292 | 18.9 |
| **Elizabeth Ann Parsons** | Labour | 2,171 | 17.9 |
| **Jonathan Tandy** | Labour | 2,079 | 17.1 |
| Jacqueline M Brennand | Conservatives | 1,988 | 16.4 |
| John Samuel Diggory | Conservatives | 1,948 | 16.1 |
| Mark Anthony Jones | Conservatives | 1,654 | 13.6 |

| | | Votes | % |
|---|---|---|---|
| Total for Labour | Labour | **6,542** | 53.9 |
| Total for Conservatives | Conservatives | 5,590 | 46.1 |

Turnout: 49.17%

==== Belle Vue ====
| Candidate | Political party | Votes | % |
|---|---|---|---|
| **John Mansel Williams** | Labour | 797 | 48.4 |
| Stephen John Jetley | Conservatives | 571 | 34.7 |
| Hayley Farr | Greens | 161 | 9.8 |
| Evan Melvyn Ab-Owain | Liberal Democrats | 117 | 7.1 |

Turnout: 51.14%

==== Bowbrook ====
| Candidate | Political party | Votes | % |
|---|---|---|---|
| **Peter Michael Adams** | Conservatives | 848 | 75.3 |
| Charles Patrick Wilson | Labour | 278 | 24.7 |

Turnout: 41.04%

==== Burnell ====
| Candidate | Political party | Votes | % |
|---|---|---|---|
| **Timothy G Barker** | Conservatives | 1,234 | 75.1 |
| Patricia Mary Stokes-Smith | Liberal Democrats | 409 | 24.9 |

Turnout: 52.35%

==== Castlefields and Ditherington ====
| Candidate | Political party | Votes | % |
|---|---|---|---|
| **Alan Neil Mosley** | Labour | 719 | 57.2 |
| Deborah Scollan | Conservatives | 277 | 22.0 |
| Tobias Oliver Ray Green | Greens | 152 | 12.1 |
| Michael Antony Foulkes | BNP | 109 | 8.7 |

Turnout: 41.65%

==== Chirbury and Worthen ====
| Candidate | Political party | Votes | % |
|---|---|---|---|
| **Heather Mary Kidd** | Liberal Democrats | 791 | |
| Philip Dennis Morgan | Conservatives | 613 | |

Turnout: 59.81%

==== Copthorne ====
| Candidate | Political party | Votes | % |
|---|---|---|---|
| **Peter Anthony Nutting** | Conservatives | 812 | 53.7 |
| Margaret Alison Hamer | Liberal Democrats | 699 | 46.3 |

Turnout: 49.69%

==== Harlescott ====
| Candidate | Political party | Votes | % |
|---|---|---|---|
| **Vernon Thomas Bushell** | Labour | 443 | 39.8 |
| James Philip Taggart | Conservatives | 380 | 34.2 |
| Sharon Carrington | Liberal Democrats | 147 | 13.2 |
| Karl Antony Foulkes | BNP | 142 | 12.8 |

Turnout: 34.21%

==== Longden ====
| Candidate | Political party | Votes | % |
|---|---|---|---|
| **Roger Arthur Evans** | Liberal Democrats | 970 | 58.4 |
| John Peter Jetson | Conservatives | 690 | 41.6 |

Turnout: 53.31%

==== Loton ====
| Candidate | Political party | Votes | % |
|---|---|---|---|
| **David William Llywellyn Roberts** | Conservatives | 1077 | 74.8 |
| Frederick Roland Smith | Liberal Democrats | 362 | 25.2 |

Turnout: 47.23%

==== Meole ====
| Candidate | Political party | Votes | % |
|---|---|---|---|
| **Michael John Owen** | Conservatives | 1035 | 71.3 |
| Gilian Grafton | Liberal Democrats | 416 | 28.7 |

Turnout: 48.18%

==== Minsterley ====
| Candidate | Political party | Votes | % |
|---|---|---|---|
| **Tudor Bebb** | Conservatives | 788 | 60.5 |
| Marian Eva Balmond | Liberal Democrats | 326 | 25.0 |
| Nancy Rose Davies | Greens | 189 | 14.5 |

Turnout: 42.58%

==== Monkmoor ====
| Candidate | Political party | Votes | % |
|---|---|---|---|
| **John Anthony Durnell** | Conservatives | 582 | 51.2 |
| Pamela Ann Moseley | Labour | 554 | 48.8 |

Turnout: 35.45%

==== Porthill ====
| Candidate | Political party | Votes | % |
|---|---|---|---|
| **Anne Marilyn Chebsey** | Liberal Democrats | 864 | 56.8 |
| Judith Anne Williams | Conservatives | 658 | 43.2 |

Turnout: 47.99%

==== Quarry and Coton Hill ====
| Candidate | Political party | Votes | % |
|---|---|---|---|
| **Maxwell Keith Winchester** | Conservatives | 426 | 43.6 |
| Andrew David Murray Bannerman | Liberal Democrats | 353 | 36.1 |
| Huw Richard Wystan Peach | Greens | 141 | 14.4 |
| James Grimshaw Gollins | Albion | 57 | 5.8 |

Turnout: 38.79%

==== Radbrook ====
| Candidate | Political party | Votes | % |
|---|---|---|---|
| **Keith Raymond Roberts** | Conservatives | 754 | 51.0 |
| Anne Margaret Woolland | Liberal Democrats | 723 | 49.0 |

Turnout: 48.51%

==== Severn Valley ====
The Severn Valley division was uncontested in 2009, resulting in the Conservative candidate being elected unopposed.

| Candidate | Political party |
|---|---|
| **Claire Margaret Wild** | Conservatives |

==== Sundorne ====
| Candidate | Political party | Votes | % |
|---|---|---|---|
| **Karen Lesley Burgoyne** | Conservatives | 443 | 46.2 |
| Daniel Moore | Labour | 346 | 36.1 |
| Helen Marie Foulkes | BNP | 169 | 17.6 |

Turnout: 32.79%

==== Tern ====
| Candidate | Political party | Votes | % |
|---|---|---|---|
| **Edward John Everall** | Conservatives | 997 | 62.0 |
| Helen Sonia Woodman | Liberal Democrats | 611 | 38.0 |

Turnout: 48.35%

==== Underdale ====
| Candidate | Political party | Votes | % |
|---|---|---|---|
| **Jonathan Miles Whitthorn Kenny** | Liberal Democrats | 857 | 67.7 |
| Mary Anne Stuart Richey | Conservatives | 126 | 10.0 |
| Robert Henry Philip Allum | Labour | 119 | 9.4 |
| James Alexander Lewis | BNP | 87 | 6.9 |
| James Alan Whittaker | Greens | 77 | 6.1 |

Turnout: 43.00%

=== North area results ===
Following are the results for the electoral divisions located in the North administrative sub-division of Shropshire Council, which covers the areas of the previous North Shropshire and Oswestry district and borough councils. Unless otherwise stated, all divisions elect a single member. The winning candidates are marked in bold.

==== Cheswardine ====
| Candidate | Political party | Votes | % |
|---|---|---|---|
| **Andrew Betham Davies** | Conservatives | 781 | |
| Michael Gould | Independent | 369 | |
| Robert Patrick O'Brien | Labour | 112 | |

Turnout: 40.37%

==== Ellesmere Urban ====
| Candidate | Political party | Votes | % |
|---|---|---|---|
| **Elizabeth Ann Hartley** | Conservatives | 539 | 46.0 |
| Brian John Knight | Liberal Democrats | 520 | 44.4 |
| Elizabeth Ballamy | Labour | 113 | 9.6 |

Turnout: 40.52%

==== Hodnet ====
| Candidate | Political party | Votes | % |
|---|---|---|---|
| **Karen Dale Calder** | Conservatives | 987 | 84.1 |
| Janet Beverley Smith | Labour | 187 | 15.9 |

Turnout: 42.56%

==== Llanymynech ====
| Candidate | Political party | Votes | % |
|---|---|---|---|
| **Arthur Edward Walpole** | Conservatives | 901 | 68.0 |
| Brian Laurence Willis | Liberal Democrats | 424 | 32.0 |

Turnout: 42.56%

==== Market Drayton East ====
| Candidate | Political party | Votes | % |
|---|---|---|---|
| **John Brian Gillow** | Conservatives | 1,100 | 76.9 |
| Robert Peter Bentley | Labour | 331 | 23.1 |

Turnout: 41.84%

==== Market Drayton West ====
Market Drayton West is a two-member division, with voters able to cast two separate votes in the election. In 2009, both Conservative candidates topped the vote, resulting in their election.

| Candidate | Political party | Votes | % |
|---|---|---|---|
| **David James Minnery** | Conservatives | 1,192 | 29.8 |
| **Roger Alan Hughes** | Conservatives | 1,179 | 29.5 |
| Roger Elwyn Walker | Labour | 628 | 15.7 |
| Valerie Jean Taylor | Labour | 606 | 15.2 |
| Philip Richard Reddall | BNP | 390 | 9.8 |

| | | Votes | % |
|---|---|---|---|
| Total for Conservatives | Conservatives | **2,371** | 59.3 |
| Total for Labour | Labour | 1,234 | 30.9 |
| Total for BNP | BNP | 390 | 9.8 |

Turnout: 34.25%

==== Oswestry East ====
Oswestry East is a two-member division, with voters able to cast two separate votes in the election. In 2009, both Conservative candidates topped the vote, resulting in their election.

| Candidate | Political party | Votes | % |
|---|---|---|---|
| **Martin Bennett** | Conservatives | 963 | 27.7 |
| **William Benyon** | Conservatives | 962 | 27.7 |
| Peter Alun Cherrington | Independent | 697 | 20.0 |
| Philip Damion Box | Labour | 500 | 14.4 |
| John Edward Keirl | BNP | 356 | 10.2 |

| | | Votes | % |
|---|---|---|---|
| Total for Conservatives | Conservatives | **1,925** | 55.3 |
| Total for Independent | Independent | 697 | 20.0 |
| Total for Labour | Labour | 500 | 14.4 |
| Total for BNP | BNP | 356 | 10.2 |

Turnout: 30.47%

==== Oswestry South ====
| Candidate | Political party | Votes | % |
|---|---|---|---|
| **Keith Robert Barrow** | Conservatives | 660 | 57.0 |
| Owen Bevan Thomas | Greens | 218 | 18.8 |
| Romer Wilfred Hoseason | Liberal Democrats | 201 | 17.4 |
| David Mervyn Hughes | Labour | 79 | 6.8 |

Turnout: 36.39%

==== Oswestry West ====
| Candidate | Political party | Votes | % |
|---|---|---|---|
| **Vincent John Hunt** | Conservatives | 478 | 44.1 |
| Saffron Neon Gabriel Rainey | Independent | 389 | 35.9 |
| Elaine Channon | Liberal Democrats | 218 | 20.1 |

Turnout: 37.04%

==== Prees ====
| Candidate | Political party | Votes | % |
|---|---|---|---|
| **Paul Anthony Donald Wynn** | Conservatives | 616 | 43.3 |
| Janet Ann Proudlove | Independent | 302 | 21.3 |
| Leslie Edwin Phillips | Independent | 293 | 20.6 |
| Robert Andrew Irvine-List | UKIP | 210 | 14.8 |

Turnout: 43.65%

==== Ruyton and Baschurch ====
| Candidate | Political party | Votes | % |
|---|---|---|---|
| **Aggie Josephine Caesar-Homden** | Conservatives | 735 | 55.9 |
| Colin Russell Case | Liberal Democrats | 380 | 28.9 |
| Susan Nina Boulding | Greens | 201 | 15.3 |

Turnout: 46.06%

==== Selattyn and Gobowen ====
Selattyn and Gobowen is a two-member division, with voters able to cast two separate votes in the election. The Liberal Democrat candidate and one of the two Conservative candidates topped the poll and they were both elected.

| Candidate | Political party | Votes | % |
|---|---|---|---|
| **David Glyn Lloyd** | Conservatives | 1,039 | 36.4 |
| **Trevor Davies** | Liberal Democrats | 985 | 34.5 |
| Barbara Jane Craig | Conservatives | 831 | 29.1 |

| | | Votes | % |
|---|---|---|---|
| Total for Conservatives | Conservatives | **1,870** | 65.5 |
| Total for Liberal Democrats | Liberal Democrats | 985 | 34.5 |

Turnout: 34.42%

==== Shawbury ====
| Candidate | Political party | Votes | % |
|---|---|---|---|
| **Simon Paul Anderson Jones** | Conservatives | 893 | 62.7 |
| Norman Aldhous | Liberal Democrats | 532 | 37.3 |

Turnout: 42.22%

==== St Martin's ====
| Candidate | Political party | Votes | % |
|---|---|---|---|
| **Stephen Harry Davenport** | Conservatives | 588 | 45.0 |
| Neil Graham | Independent | 407 | 31.1 |
| William Henry Jenkins | Labour | 312 | 23.9 |

Turnout: 38.68%

==== St Oswald ====
| Candidate | Political party | Votes | % |
|---|---|---|---|
| **Joyce Bernadette Barrow** | Conservatives | 824 | 65.3 |
| John Clive Humphries | Liberal Democrats | 437 | 34.7 |

Turnout: 39.78%

==== The Meres ====
| Candidate | Political party | Votes | % |
|---|---|---|---|
| **Brian Beckett Williams** | Conservatives | 1,061 | 66.8 |
| Andrew Gordon Whyte | Liberal Democrats | 331 | 20.8 |
| Stephen Christopher Boulding | Greens | 196 | 12.3 |

Turnout: 47.20%

==== Wem ====
Wem is a two-member division, with voters able to cast two separate votes in the election. The Liberal Democrat candidate and an independent candidate topped the poll and were both elected.

| Candidate | Political party | Votes | % |
|---|---|---|---|
| **Christopher John Mellings** | Liberal Democrats | 1,497 | 29.2 |
| **Pauline Anne Dee** | Independent | 1,061 | 20.7 |
| Peter Broomhall | Conservatives | 729 | 14.2 |
| John Hamilton Murray | Conservatives | 663 | 13.0 |
| Margaret J Carson | Independent | 543 | 10.6 |
| William Nevett | Independent | 361 | 7.1 |
| Ian R Deakin | BNP | 265 | 5.2 |

| | | Votes | % |
|---|---|---|---|
| Total for Independents | Independents | **1,965** | 38.4 |
| Total for Liberal Democrats | Liberal Democrats | 1,497 | 29.2 |
| Total for Conservatives | Conservatives | 1,392 | 27.2 |
| Total for BNP | BNP | 265 | 5.2 |

Turnout: 43.40%

==== Whitchurch North ====
Whitchurch North is a two-member division, with voters able to cast two separate votes in the election. In 2009, both Conservative candidates topped the vote, resulting in their election.

| Candidate | Political party | Votes | % |
|---|---|---|---|
| **Thomas Henry Biggins** | Conservatives | 1,198 | 36.5 |
| **Margaret Ruth Mullock** | Conservatives | 836 | 25.4 |
| Robert John Hewson | Independent | 428 | 13.0 |
| Andrew Hadden Richardson | Liberal Democrats | 339 | 10.3 |
| Pauline Lynn Jones | Liberal Democrats | 296 | 9.0 |
| Stephen Nigel Clifford | Labour | 188 | 5.7 |

| | | Votes | % |
|---|---|---|---|
| Total for Conservatives | Conservatives | **2,034** | 61.9 |
| Total for Liberal Democrats | Liberal Democrats | 635 | 19.3 |
| Total for Independent | Independent | 428 | 13.0 |
| Total for Labour | Labour | 188 | 5.7 |

Turnout: 34.86%

==== Whitchurch South ====
| Candidate | Political party | Votes | % |
|---|---|---|---|
| **Gerald Lionel Dakin** | Conservatives | 561 | 52.3 |
| Christopher Arthur Rawson Chambers | Independent | 313 | 29.2 |
| Ruth Christine Leach | Greens | 116 | 10.8 |
| Tricia Dawson | Labour | 83 | 7.7 |

Turnout: 33.85%

==== Whittington ====
| Candidate | Political party | Votes | % |
|---|---|---|---|
| **Stephen Frank Charmley** | Conservatives | 794 | 61.4 |
| Patricia Anne Raine | Independent | 500 | 38.6 |

Turnout: 41.23%

=== South area results ===
Following are the results for the electoral divisions located in the South administrative sub-division of Shropshire Council, which covers the areas of the former South Shropshire and Bridgnorth districts. Unless otherwise stated, all divisions elect a single member. The winning candidates are marked in bold.

==== Albrighton ====
| Candidate | Political party | Votes | % |
|---|---|---|---|
| **Malcolm Gregory Pate** | Conservatives | 888 | 48.6 |
| David Alan Beechey | Independent | 770 | 42.1 |
| James Paul Lusk | Labour | 170 | 9.3 |

Turnout: 49.05%

==== Alveley and Claverley ====
| Candidate | Political party | Votes | % |
|---|---|---|---|
| **Tina Woodward** | Conservatives | 797 | |
| Frederick David Voysey | Liberal Democrats | 430 | |
| George Benjamin Henry Lee | Independent | 394 | |

Turnout: 49.45%

==== Bishop's Castle ====
| Candidate | Political party | Votes | % |
|---|---|---|---|
| **Peter Francis Phillips** | Liberal Democrats | 754 | |
| Georgiana Louise Dacre Ellis | Conservatives | 641 | |
| Jacqueline Mary Morrish | Greens | 186 | |

Turnout: 55.83%

==== Bridgnorth East and Astley Abbotts ====
Bridgnorth East and Astley Abbotts is a two-member division, with voters able to cast two separate votes in the election. In 2009, both Conservative candidates topped the vote, resulting in their election.

| Candidate | Political party | Votes | % |
|---|---|---|---|
| **Christian James Lea** | Conservatives | 941 | |
| **William Michael Parr** | Conservatives | 875 | |
| Adrian Ebrutal Tacchi | Independent | 796 | |
| David Walker | Liberal Democrats | 578 | |
| Paul Anthony Tacchi | Independent | 550 | |
| Iain Reginald Findlay Seivewright | Liberal Democrats | 520 | |
| Patricia Joan Lee | Independent | 172 | |

| | | Votes | % |
|---|---|---|---|
| Total for Conservatives | Conservatives | **1,816** | |
| Total for Independents | Independents | 1,518 | |
| Total for Liberal Democrats | Liberal Democrats | 1,098 | |

Turnout: 36.29%

==== Bridgnorth West and Tasley ====
Bridgnorth West and Tasley is a two-member division, with voters able to cast two separate votes in the election. In 2009, both Conservative candidates topped the vote, resulting in their election.

| Candidate | Political party | Votes | % |
|---|---|---|---|
| **Leslie John Paul Winwood** | Conservatives | 1199 | |
| **John Hurst-Knight** | Conservatives | 940 | |
| Richard Douglas Stilwell | Liberal Democrats | 564 | |
| Vanessa Naomi Voysey | Liberal Democrats | 512 | |
| Edward John Shirley | Independent | 510 | |
| Norman Philip Charles Cottrell | Independent | 400 | |
| Geoffrey Thomas Bodenham | Independent | 272 | |

| | | Votes | % |
|---|---|---|---|
| Total for Conservatives | Conservatives | **2,139** | |
| Total for Independents | Independents | 1,182 | |
| Total for Liberal Democrats | Liberal Democrats | 1,076 | |

Turnout: 37.15%

==== Broseley ====
| Candidate | Political party | Votes | % |
|---|---|---|---|
| **Jean Elizabeth Jones** | Labour | 1006 | |
| Josephine Challinor | Conservatives | 490 | |

Turnout: 41.78%

==== Brown Clee ====
| Candidate | Political party | Votes | % |
|---|---|---|---|
| **Robert Stuart Tindall** | Conservatives | 919 | |
| Richard Andrew Kightley | Liberal Democrats | 419 | |

Turnout: 44.92%

==== Church Stretton and Craven Arms ====
Church Stretton and Craven Arms is a two-member division, with voters able to cast two separate votes in the election. In 2009, both Conservative candidates topped the vote, resulting in their election.

| Candidate | Political party | Votes | % |
|---|---|---|---|
| **David William Evans** | Conservatives | 1325 | |
| **James Allan Gibson** | Conservatives | 1222 | |
| Neville Percy Stephens | Liberal Democrats | 1072 | |
| Robert Douglas Welch | Liberal Democrats | 903 | |
| Helen Claire Byrne | Greens | 595 | |
| Mark Edward Ernest Morris | Independent | 591 | |
| David Percival Gibbon | Greens | 552 | |
| Clive Stephen Leworthy | Labour | 502 | |
| James Lloyd Whittall | BNP | 221 | |

| | | Votes | % |
|---|---|---|---|
| Total for Conservatives | Conservatives | **2,547** | |
| Total for Liberal Democrats | Liberal Democrats | 1,975 | |
| Total for Greens | Greens | 1,147 | |
| Total for Independent | Independent | 591 | |
| Total for Labour | Labour | 502 | |
| Total for BNP | BNP | 221 | |

Turnout: 54.92%

==== Clee ====
| Candidate | Political party | Votes | % |
|---|---|---|---|
| **Paul Vincent Andrews** | Conservatives | 714 | |
| Richard Mark Huffer | Liberal Democrats | 694 | |
| Adrian Harcourt Coles | Independent | 471 | |

Turnout: 52.69%

==== Cleobury Mortimer ====
Cleobury Mortimer is a two-member division, with voters able to cast two separate votes in the election. In 2009, the Independent Community and Health Concern candidate and one of the two Conservative candidates topped the vote, resulting in their election.

| Candidate | Political party | Votes | % |
|---|---|---|---|
| **Doreen Madge Shineton** | Independent Community and Health Concern | 1454 | |
| **Gwilym Howard Leslie Butler** | Conservatives | 1304 | |
| Betty Doreen Davies | Independent | 1181 | |
| Ian James Suthers | Conservatives | 575 | |

| | | Votes | % |
|---|---|---|---|
| Total for Conservatives | Conservatives | **1,879** | |
| Total for ICHC | Independent Community and Health Concern | 1,454 | |
| Total for Independent | Independent | 1,181 | |

Turnout: 47.96%

==== Clun ====
| Candidate | Political party | Votes | % |
|---|---|---|---|
| **Nigel John Hartin** | Liberal Democrats | 962 | |
| Jacqueline Williams | Conservatives | 900 | |

Turnout: 61.18%

==== Corvedale ====
| Candidate | Political party | Votes | % |
|---|---|---|---|
| **Cecilia Mary Anne Motley** | Conservatives | 1020 | |
| Claude Lowry Bodenham | Independent | 701 | |

Turnout: 59.07%

==== Highley ====
| Candidate | Political party | Votes | % |
|---|---|---|---|
| **Eunice Mary Nicholls** | Liberal Democrats | 654 | |
| Peter John Martin | Conservatives | 380 | |

Turnout: 37.06%

==== Ludlow East ====
| Candidate | Political party | Votes | % |
|---|---|---|---|
| **Tracey Huffer** | Liberal Democrats | 667 | |
| Edgar Charles Havard | Conservatives | 390 | |
| Christina Jean Evans | BNP | 113 | |
| Gareth Stephen Williams | Labour | 109 | |

Turnout: 42.33%

==== Ludlow North ====
| Candidate | Political party | Votes | % |
|---|---|---|---|
| **Rosanna Theresa Daphne Taylor-Smith** | Conservatives | 685 | |
| Peter Jack Corston | Liberal Democrats | 500 | |
| Graeme Perks | Independent | 206 | |
| Imogen Herford | Greens | 119 | |
| Caroline Snyder | BNP | 54 | |

Turnout: 52.54%

==== Ludlow South ====
| Candidate | Political party | Votes | % |
|---|---|---|---|
| **Martin Alan Taylor-Smith** | Conservatives | 757 | |
| Elizabeth Vivienne Parry | Liberal Democrats | 755 | |

Turnout: 52.09%

==== Much Wenlock ====
| Candidate | Political party | Votes | % |
|---|---|---|---|
| **Paul Milner Whiteman** | Conservatives | 779 | |
| David Michael John Gibbon | Independent | 531 | |
| Philip John Robinson | Liberal Democrats | 357 | |

Turnout: 47.99%

==== Shifnal North ====
| Candidate | Political party | Votes | % |
|---|---|---|---|
| **Gordon Frank Tonkinson** | Conservatives | 659 | |
| Kevin David Turley | Independent | 482 | |
| Gillian Elizabeth Seymour | UKIP | 269 | |
| Raymond Frederick Stickland | Independent | 86 | |

Turnout: 40.98%

==== Shifnal South and Cosford ====
| Candidate | Political party | Votes | % |
|---|---|---|---|
| **Stuart John West** | Conservatives | 731 | |
| David Ridley Victor Murray | Liberal Democrats | 415 | |
| Brian Edward Hyde Seymour | UKIP | 235 | |
| David John Carey | Labour | 151 | |

Turnout: 45.17%

==== Worfield ====
| Candidate | Political party | Votes | % |
|---|---|---|---|
| **Michael Linden Wood** | Conservatives | 898 | |
| Margaret Edmonson Chalmers Winckler | Independent | 287 | |
| Helen Howell | Liberal Democrats | 246 | |

Turnout: 48.45%
