= Kingsland, Shropshire =

Suburb of Shrewsbury, Shropshire, England

Coordinates: 52.707°N 2.754°W

Kingsland
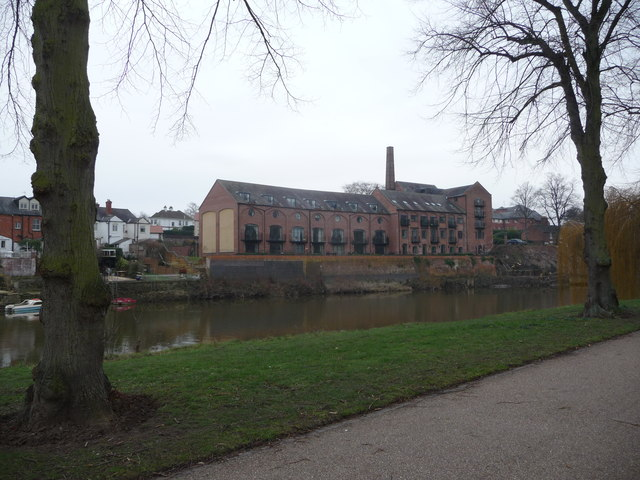
- The old Kingsland Brewery beside the River Severn

- Location within Shropshire
- Population: 1,525 (2011.Ward)
- OS grid reference: SJ492134
- Civil parish: Shrewsbury
- Unitary authority: Shropshire
- Ceremonial county: Shropshire
- Region: West Midlands
- Country: England
- Sovereign state: United Kingdom
- Post town: Shrewsbury
- Postcode district: SY3
- Dialling code: 01743
- Police: West Mercia
- Fire: Shropshire
- Ambulance: West Midlands
- UK Parliament: Shrewsbury

Kingsland is a suburb of the town Shrewsbury, Shropshire in the West Midlands of England. It lies adjacent to the town centre of Shrewsbury across the River Severn by the Kingsland Bridge, built 1881.

The Kingsland fields from the Middle Ages were a fairground to where the trade guilds of Shrewsbury used to parade, each guild having an arbour there, on the Monday after the feast of Corpus Christi, which became known as the Shrewsbury Show.

Thomas Anderson, a soldier in the Dragoons was executed, as a deserter and Jacobite sympathizer, near the Butchers' Arbour on Kingsland, on 11 December 1752. He was the last English martyr for the Stuart cause.

Horse racing used to be held on Kingsland's common land, otherwise used for grazing, until crowding led to the creation of a race course at Bicton Heath in 1729. The first recorded cricket match in Shropshire was played on Kingsland, by a Shrewsbury Cricket Society, in August 1794.

In the early 19th century the Shrewsbury Show was thought to be in decline but it revived after the advent of rail transport to the town. However the disorder and growing size of the crowds caused a petition for its eventual abolition in 1875.

This measure was a precondition to the residential development of the area for homes of the wealthy, which grew after Shrewsbury School moved there. For the building of the houses, brickyards were set up at Copthorne which were linked to Kingsland by a tramline running along the line of Porthill Drive, Porthill Road, Roman Road and Kennedy Road.

The campus of Shrewsbury School occupies some of the land overlooking the River Severn. The main building was originally built in the 18th century as a foundling hospital, and was later a workhouse for Shrewsbury before the School moved into it from the town centre in 1882.

One of the former Victorian mansions, Kingsland Grange, became the preparatory school today (2015) called Shrewsbury High Prep School.
