= Harlescott =

Suburb of Shrewsbury, Shropshire, England

Coordinates: 52.7365°N 2.722627°W

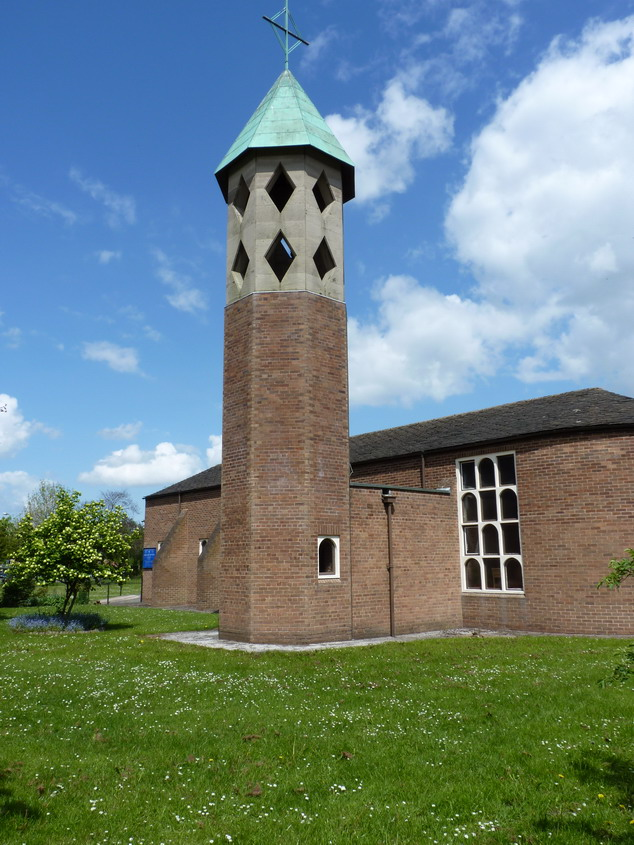
- Our Lady of Pity Roman Catholic Church

- Location within Shropshire
- Population: 5,060 (2011.Ward)
- OS grid reference: SJ513156
- Unitary authority: Shropshire
- Ceremonial county: Shropshire
- Region: West Midlands
- Country: England
- Sovereign state: United Kingdom
- Post town: Shrewsbury
- Postcode district: SY1
- Dialling code: 01743
- Police: West Mercia
- Fire: Shropshire
- Ambulance: West Midlands
- UK Parliament: Shrewsbury

Harlescott (/hɑːrlskɒt/ HARL-scott, locally also /hɒlskət/ HOLS-kət) is a suburb of the town of Shrewsbury, county town of Shropshire. It is one of the most industrial parts of the town, and is the 5th most deprived ward in non-metropolitan Shropshire Neighbouring suburbs include Sundorne to the east and Ditherington to the south. Note that many locals, particularly those born before about 1985, use the term "Harlescott" to refer to a wider area than the council ward, including much of what is officially "Sundorne" (to the east of Whitchurch and Battlefield Roads) and also much of the Heathgates and Mount Pleasant areas (sometimes called "Heath Farm").

== History and topography ==
The centre of the area contains the remains of a moated settlement, probably the original Harlescott Grange. The earthwork and buried remains of the medieval moated site are situated on a gentle north east facing slope. It is now surrounded by a modern housing estate, but from this location there would originally have been extensive views of the surrounding area. The moat is now visible as a slight earthwork having been drained in 1950 and largely infilled following the construction of the housing estate. The arms of the moat, which survive as buried features, are between 12m and 15m wide and define a rectangular island approximately 40m by 46m. Material excavated from the moat has been used to raise the surface of the island between 1.2m and 2m above the level of the surrounding ground. An account of the site in 1937 indicated that the sides of the moat were lined with masonry and when the moat was drained, 13th century pottery was found. Sherds of medieval pottery were also found when a small-scale archaeological excavation was conducted in 1960.

There was once a military supply depot here, RAF Harlescott, but this has closed and the nearest RAF base is now a few miles away at Shawbury. Harlescott was also once a fairly notable railway centre, but now all the sidings have gone. Only the Welsh Marches Line itself and Harlescott Crossing remain.

Shrewsbury's livestock market was at Harlescott between 1956 and 2006 - it is now at a new site out-of-town at Battlefield to the north. The site has been redeveloped with a Tesco supermarket. Next door there is a Park and Ride car park. Every Sunday, when there are no Park and Ride buses, an open-air market is held at this site.

Harlescott has been the location of the Arriva Midlands Shrewsbury bus depot since 2012, with the newly built depot (behind the Park and Ride site by Tesco) replacing the former Midland Red/Arriva Midlands depot in Ditherington, which was then demolished.

There were four bank branches nearby on Harlescott Lane, two of which are now closed. There were plans in 2011 to expand the Tesco, including new units to accommodate the banks. However, these plans never came into place and the units are now housing a fast food outlet and a barber.

There are two pubs in Harlescott, one called The Anchor Inn and the other Harry Hotspur. The latter is named after Harry Hotspur, who fought at the Battle of Shrewsbury, which took place in what is now Battlefield. ("The Coracle", Sundorne Road, "The Heathgates" on the Heathgates island, and "The Steam Wagon" on Mount Pleasant Road are also in Harlescott according to the wider definition, see above). Another pub, The Harlescott, closed and in 2006 was set alight by arsonists. It has since been demolished and a new supermarket was built on the site.

== Education ==
Harlescott's Secondary school was The Grange School, an 11 to 16 co-educational secondary school. It amalgamated with Sundorne School in 2016 into a split-site school known as Shrewsbury Academy.
