= Seddon Pennine =

Seddon Pennine was a name given to several different single-deck bus chassis built by Seddon (later Seddon Atkinson):

- Seddon Pennine 4 and 6 - front-engined chassis with Perkins engine
  - The Pennine 4-236, a small variant of the Pennine 4 also known as the Midi, was built for several operators, most notably SELNEC/Greater Manchester PTE, whose Midis included a battery-electric example.
- Seddon Pennine 5 - rear-engined chassis with Perkins engine
- Seddon Pennine RU - rear-engined chassis with Gardner engine (sometimes simply referred to as the Seddon RU)
  - Greater Manchester PTE also operated a battery-electric bus based on the RU chassis, no. EX61, with Chloride batteries
- Seddon Pennine 7 - mid-engined chassis with Gardner engine

Pennine was also the name of the coachbuilding division of Seddon.
