= Ditherington =

Suburb of Shrewsbury, England

Coordinates: 52.7260°N 2.7350°W

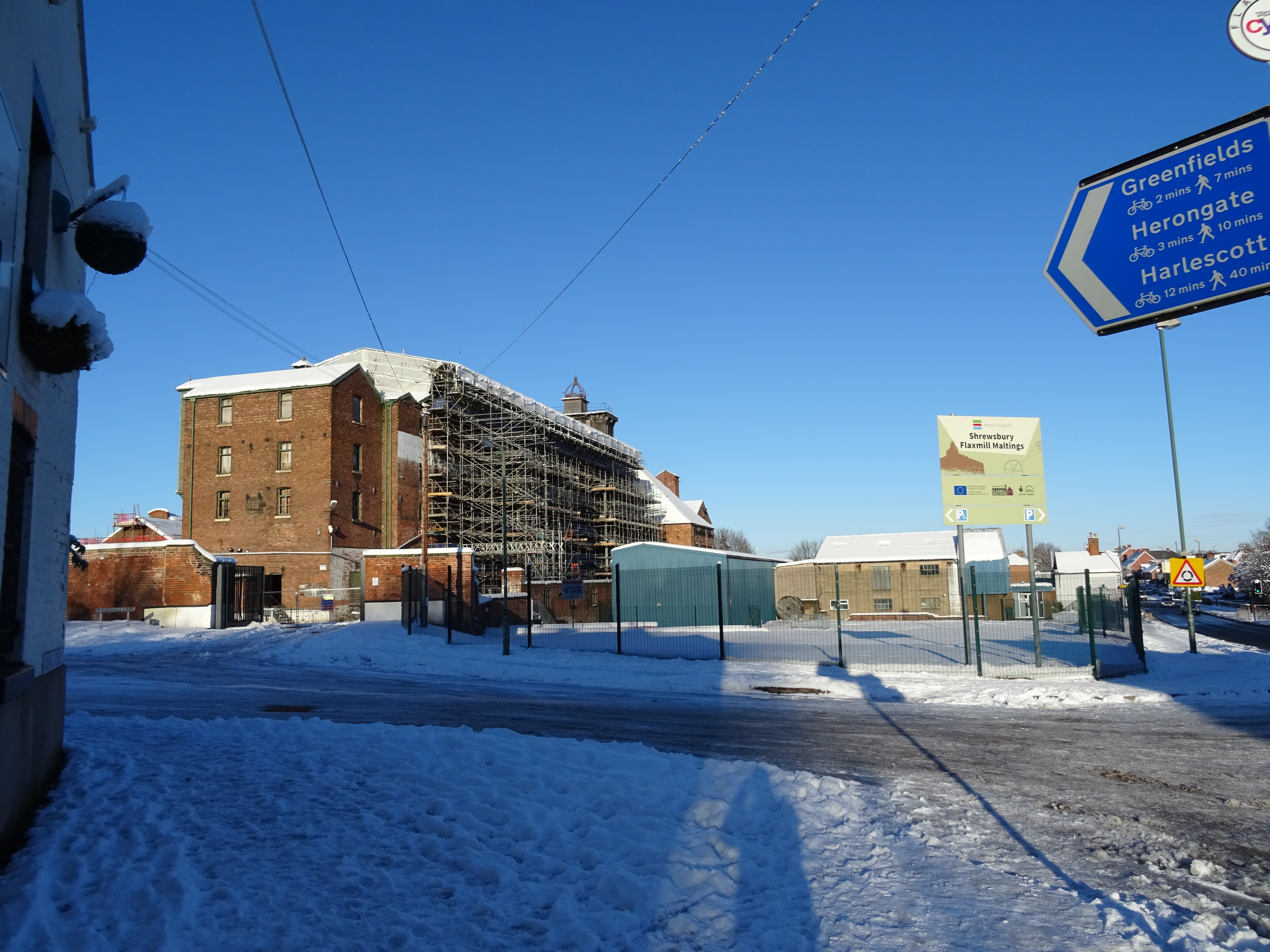
- The Ditherington Flax Mill viewed from Crewe Street

- Location within Shropshire
- OS grid reference: SJ502143
- Unitary authority: Shropshire
- Ceremonial county: Shropshire
- Region: West Midlands
- Country: England
- Sovereign state: United Kingdom
- Post town: Shrewsbury
- Postcode district: SY1
- Dialling code: 01743
- Police: West Mercia
- Fire: Shropshire
- Ambulance: West Midlands
- UK Parliament: Shrewsbury

Ditherington is a suburb of the town of Shrewsbury, the county town of Shropshire, in England. It is the fourth most deprived ward in the Shropshire unitary authority area.

Ditherington was the location of the Arriva Midlands (former Midland Red) Shrewsbury bus depot until 2012, when it was replaced by a newly built one in Harlescott. The Ditherington depot was then demolished and acquired by the nearby Flax Mill, although, as of June 2025, it is still undeveloped.

== Ditherington Flax Mill ==
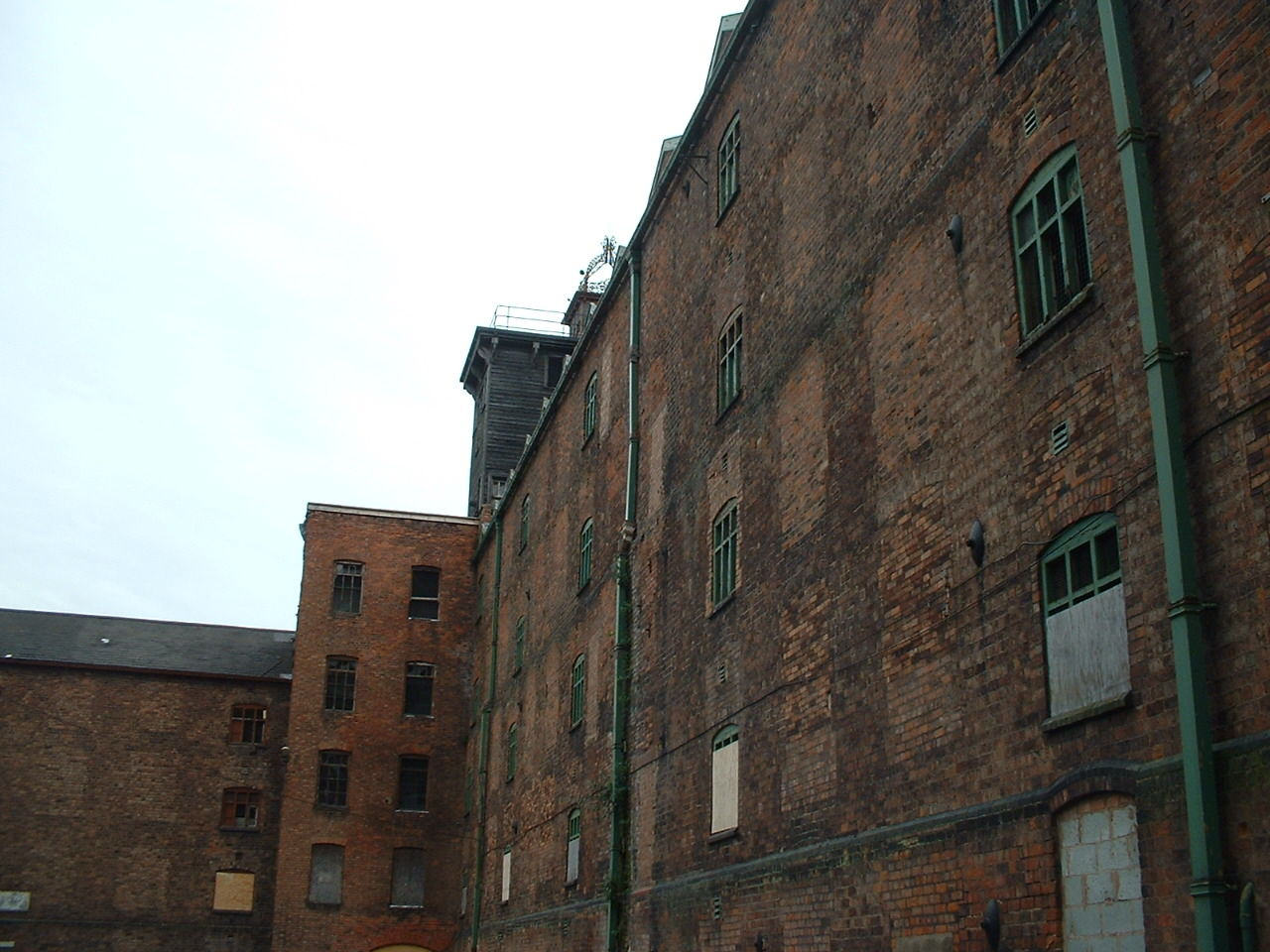
Section of the rear of the main part of the Flax Mill

The Flax Mill (also locally known as the "Maltings") is the oldest iron-framed building in the world and is seen as the "grandfather of skyscrapers". It was designed by Charles Bage and built in 1797 for John Marshall of Leeds and his partners.

It is a Grade I listed building. After decades of being derelict, it was restored and rejuvenated by Historic England, in partnership with the Friends of the Flaxmill Maltings and other organisations. The restored building opened to the public in September 2022 with a new visitor experience centre, café, offices and hirable venue space. In the long term, it is hoped that the building will be able to make sufficient money to be self-supporting, but reaching this stage will require much investment.

== Canal ==
The Shrewsbury and Newport Canal terminated in Ditherington, but no longer exists. This may also one day be restored.

== See also ==
- Harlescott
- Sundorne
