= Sundorne =

Coordinates: 52.730°N 2.723°W

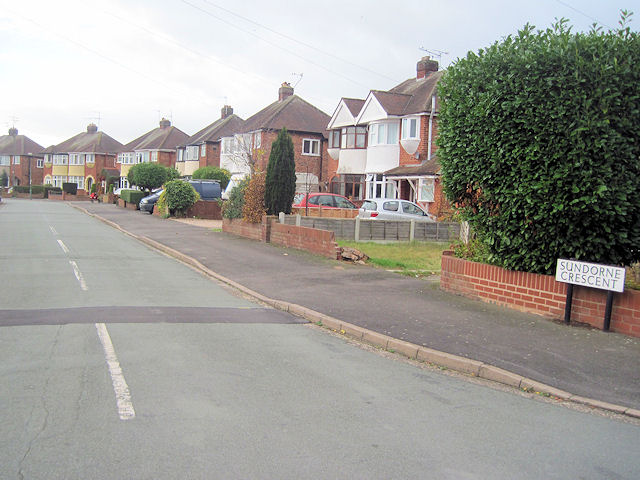
- Sundorne Crescent

- Location within Shropshire
- Population: 3,957 (2011.Ward)
- OS grid reference: SJ513156
- Unitary authority: Shropshire
- Ceremonial county: Shropshire
- Region: West Midlands
- Country: England
- Sovereign state: United Kingdom
- Post town: Shrewsbury
- Postcode district: SY1
- Dialling code: 01743
- Police: West Mercia
- Fire: Shropshire
- Ambulance: West Midlands
- UK Parliament: Shrewsbury and Atcham

Sundorne is a suburb of the town of Shrewsbury, county town of Shropshire. It is located 2 km north of the town centre. The B5062 road begins at Heathgates Roundabout and is called Sundorne Road in the Sundorne area, before crossing the Shrewsbury by-pass (the A49) at Sundorne Roundabout and heading east towards Newport. Population (2001 census): 5123, reducing to 3,957 at the 2011 census.

It is an electoral division of Shropshire Council, returning one councillor, and a ward of the town, returning a councillor to the town council. The suburb has its own library/community centre and also now has the main sports centre for the town (the Shrewsbury Sports Village). The sports centre hosted the counting for the 2009 elections to Shropshire Council and Shrewsbury Town Council. There is a public house on Sundorne Road, called the Coracle and another pub at Heathgates Roundabout, called the Heathgates.

== Military ==
One of Shrewsbury's two TA centres (the other (extant) being in Copthorne) was in Sundorne, until it closed. The land was sold and the centre building was being demolished in 2015, on its site has been built a care home, Montgomery House. The new Army Reserve Centre is located on the grounds of Shrewsbury Academy.

== Canal and river ==
The now disused Shrewsbury and Newport Canal runs through woodland in the southern part of the area. The River Severn forms the southern boundary of Sundorne.

== Education ==
The main secondary school in Sundorne was for many years called "Harlescott" school. It was then renamed Sundorne School to be more in keeping with the name of the ward (and less in keeping with the name of the Harlescott ward further to the northwest in Shrewsbury). Sundorne School stood next to Sundorne County Infants School, which has always used Sundorne in its nomenclature. Sundorne School combined with Grange School in September 2016 under the title Shrewsbury Academy. There still remains, however, Harlescott County Junior School on Featherbed Lane, the north-eastern boundary of the Sundorne ward. Many residents, especially those born before about 1985, in fact still use "Harlescott" to include Sundorne: the numerous car dealerships on Featherbed Lane carry advertisements with the address "Featherbed Lane, Harlescott", while the two churches on Meadow Farm Drive - the Church of England Holy Spirit Church and Roman Catholic Church of Our Lady of Pity - also have "Harlescott" in their titles.

== Sport ==
Sundorne is represented in sport by the local Sunday League football club AFC Sundorne, members of the Shropshire County Minor League. Other football teams play at the Sports Village, including Haughmond (named after the nearby hill) who play in the Midland Football League. The Perkins social club is also located in Sundorne, which is home of Perkins CCC, a local cricket side. Shrewsbury Sports Village is a sports centre within the Sundorne district of the town, aimed at providing a wide range of sports facilities for townspeople.

== Public transport ==
Different areas of the suburb are served by various bus routes, all of which are operated by Arriva Midland North. The 24 route runs between the Tesco store in Harlescott and Shrewsbury bus station via Shrewsbury railway station. The 519 and 524 services run between Shrewsbury bus station and Newport.

== Sundorne Castle ==
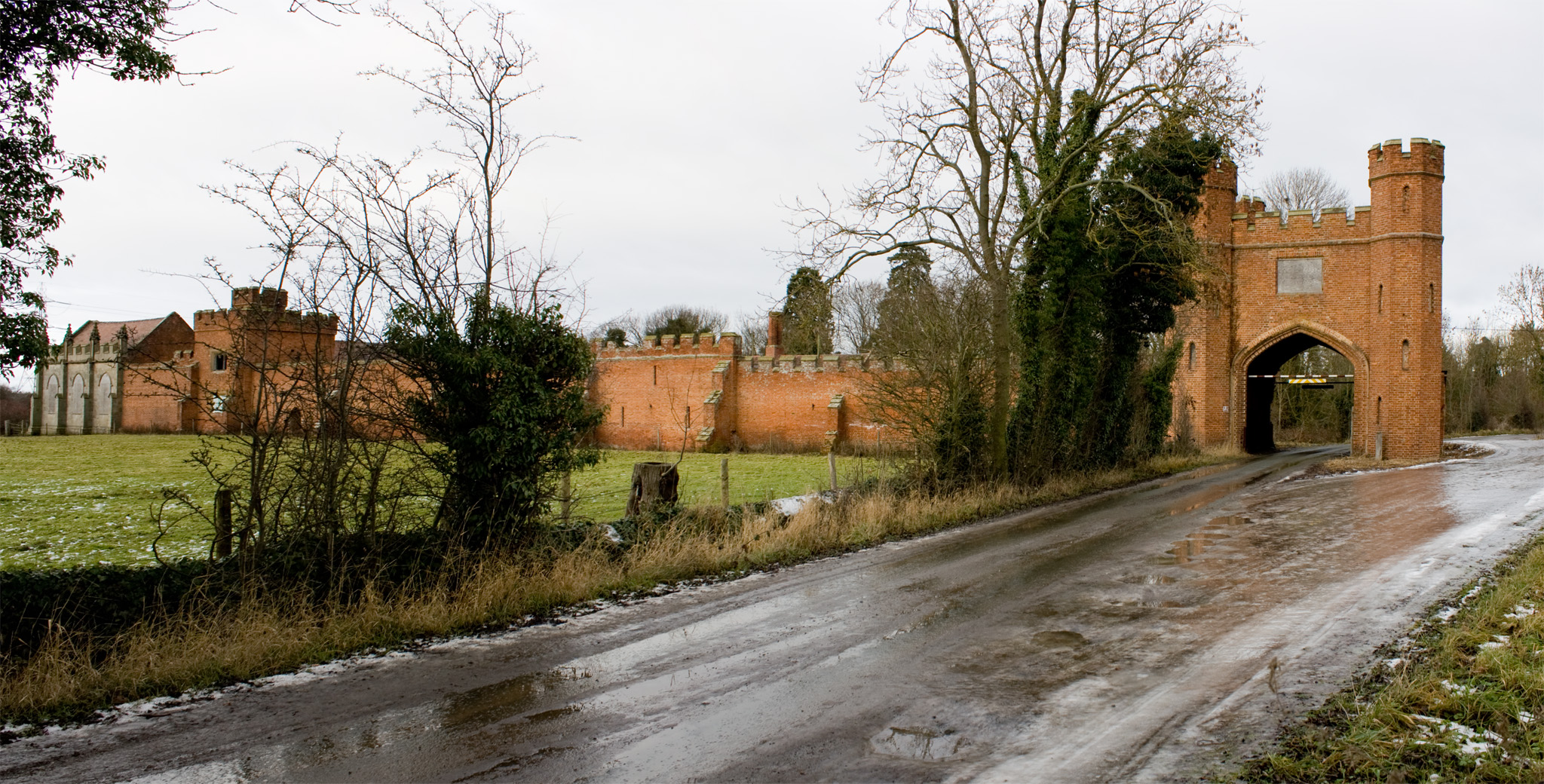
Remnants of Sundorne Castle

Nearby are the remains of the stately home known as Sundorne Castle, at onetime a seat of the Corbet-Pigott family.

== See also ==
Harlescott, Ditherington (neighbouring suburbs) and Uffington (nearby village).
