= Shrewsbury Academy =

Location
- Corndon Crescent / Worcester Road; Shrewsbury, Shropshire, SY1 4LL / SY1 3LP; England; 52.7316°N 2.7235°W

Information
- Type: Academy
- Established: 1 September 2016; 9 years ago
- Local authority: Shropshire Council
- Trust: Marches Academy Trust
- Department for Education URN: 147540 Tables
- Ofsted: Reports
- Chair of Local Governing Body: Sophy Bellis
- Headteacher: Jim Taylor
- Gender: Mixed
- Age: 11 to 16
- Website: shrewsburyacademy.co.uk

Shrewsbury Academy is an 11-16 mixed secondary school with academy status in Shrewsbury, Shropshire, England. It was established in September 2016 following the amalgamation of Sundorne School and The Grange School, operating across the two former school sites known as Corndon Crescent Campus and Worcester Road Campus respectively.

== History ==
=== The Grange School ===
The Grange School was initially a community school and converted to Academy status in 2013 when Sundorne School had also converted and sponsored the school, with both schools coming under the aegis of the Shrewsbury Academies Trust. The school offered GCSEs, BTECs, NVQs, City & Guilds courses and ASDAN awards as programmes of study for pupils.

=== Shrewsbury Academy ===
On 1 September 2019, the academy joined the Marches Academy Trust, a Shropshire Multi-academy trust.

== Notable alumni ==
The Grange School

- Bernard McNally, footballer

Sundorne School

- Steve Leslie, footballer
- Jack Price, footballer
