= Tanat Valley Coaches =

Bus and coach operator in Shropshire and Montgomeryshire, United Kingdom

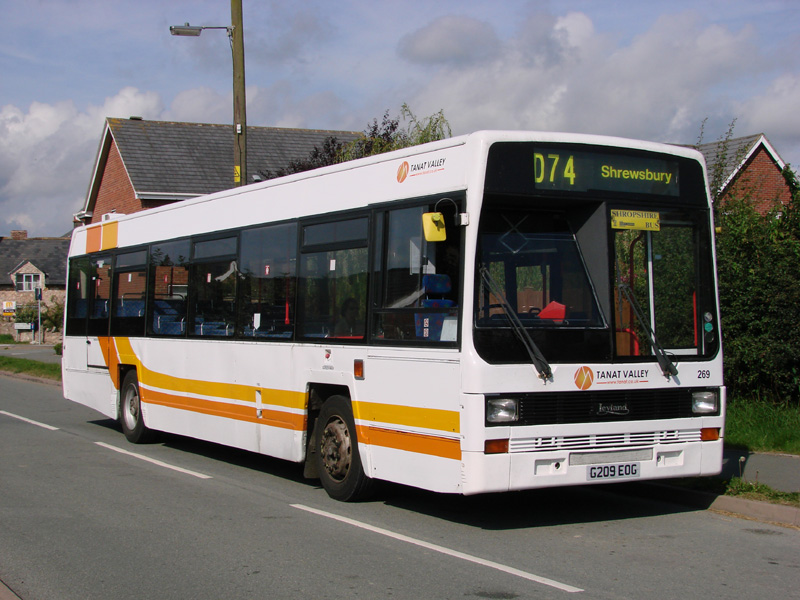
- Leyland Lynx (pictured in 2007)
- Founded: 1921; 105 years ago
- Headquarters: Llanrhaeadr-ym-Mochnant
- Service area: Shropshire and Powys
- Service type: Bus and coach
- Routes: 14
- Destinations: Llanfyllin; Montgomery; Newtown; Oswestry; Welshpool
- Chief executive: Chris Chadd
- Website: www.tanat.co.uk

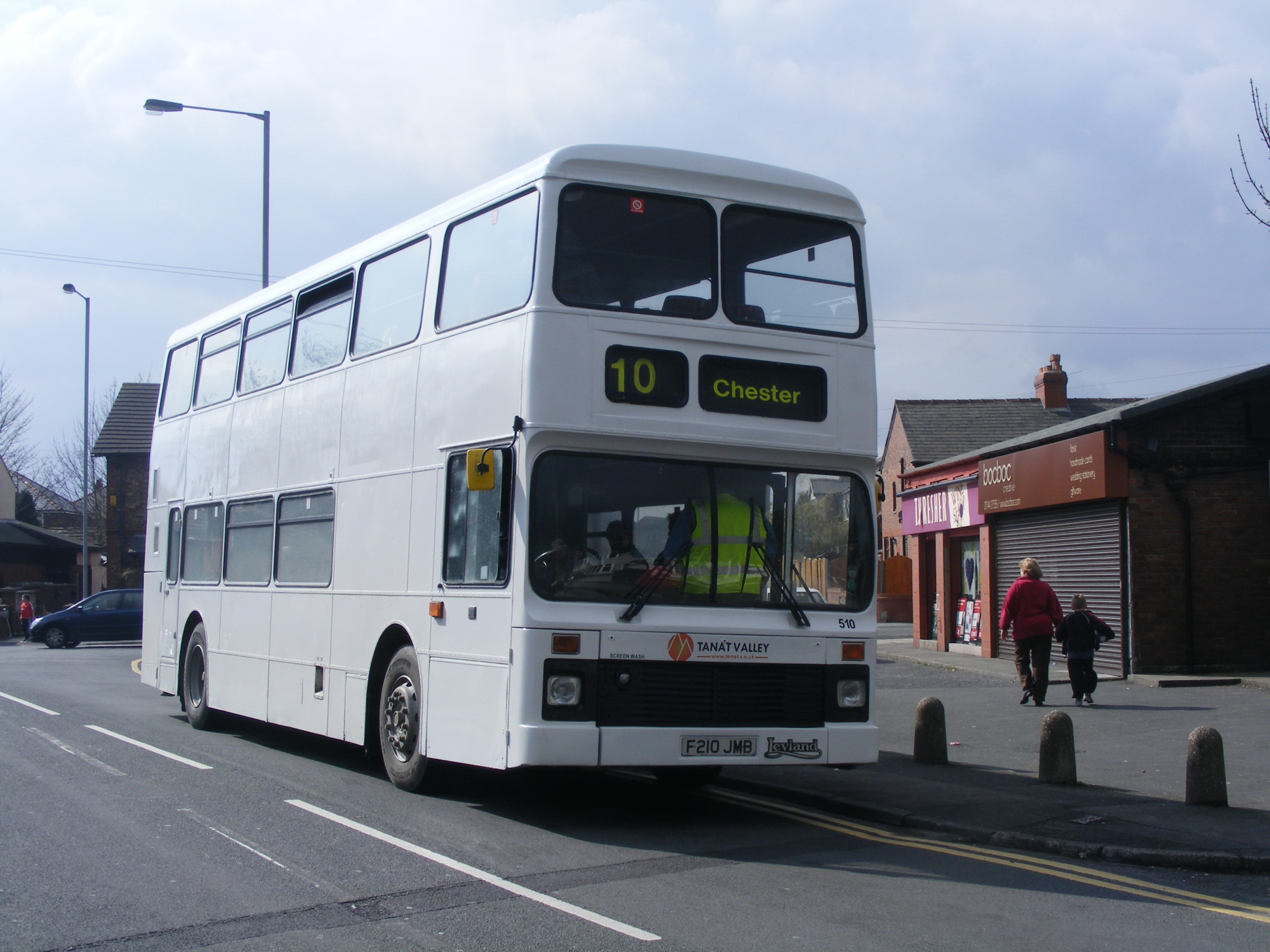
Northern Counties Palatine bodied Leyland Olympian seen on Kiln Street, St Helens, Merseyside, in April 2008

Tanat Valley Coaches operates bus and coach services in Montgomeryshire and Shropshire, in the United Kingdom.

The family-run firm is based in Llanrhaeadr-ym-Mochnant. It also has a depot in the nearby village of Pentrefelin, in addition to Kerry, near Newtown, Powys. The former includes facilities to park vehicles, whilst the latter includes workshop premises and is used to operate services.

In addition to bus and coach operation, Tanat provides private and commercial vehicle service and repair facilities within two large and fully equipped workshops.

It has a wide variety of vehicles of minibuses, midibuses, single-decker buses, double-decker buses and coaches. Tanat Valley operate 14 local public bus services, many of which are contracted by Powys County Council and Shropshire Council. The local councils and schools also contract 34 school buses, which carry approximately 1,560 students every school day. The fleet amounts to approximately 60 vehicles.

During the Covid-19 pandemic the company invested in their maintenance depot and began to offer vehicle MOT and servicing to the general public.

== See also ==
- List of bus operators of the United Kingdom
