= Edward Williams (antiquary) =

English antiquarian

- Born: 1762; Eaton Mascott, Shropshire
- Died: 3 January 1833 (aged 70–71); Shrewsbury
- Occupation: Antiquarian

Edward Williams (1762 – 3 January 1833) was an English antiquarian.

== Biography ==
Williams was the son of Edward Williams of Eaton Mascott, Shropshire, by his wife Barbara Letitia, daughter of John Mytton of Halston. He was born at Eaton Mascott, and baptised at Leighton on 8 September 1762. He was educated at Repton School, matriculated from Pembroke College, Oxford, on 28 October 1779, and graduated B.A. in 1783 (M.A. 1787). He subsequently obtained a fellowship at All Souls' College, which he held until 1818. Entering holy orders, he was appointed by his kinsman, John Corbet of Sundorne, in 1786 to the perpetual curacies of Battlefield and Uffington in Shropshire; and on 13 June 1817 All Souls' College presented him to the rectory of Chelsfield in Kent, all of which livings he held until his death.

At an early age Williams became interested in the study of antiquities and topography; and, though he did not print any works, he left behind him a great many manuscripts on the history and antiquities of Shropshire, and executed beautiful drawings of all the parish churches, the principal gentlemen's seats, and the monuments in the county. He was also a good classical scholar and botanist.

Williams gave considerable assistance to John Brickdale Blakeway in his ‘Sheriffs of Shropshire’ and ‘History of Shrewsbury,’ and to Archdeacon Joseph Plymley in his ‘Agricultural Survey of Shropshire.’ During the latter years of his life Williams discontinued his antiquarian pursuits, and devoted himself entirely to his parochial duties. He died unmarried at his residence, Coton Terrace, Shrewsbury, on 3 January 1833, and was buried on 10 January in the churchyard on the south side of Battlefield church.

Williams left numerous manuscripts relating to his researches in Shropshire, and most of them passed at his death to William Noel-Hill, third lord Berwick. Almost all Williams's manuscripts in Lord Berwick's collection were dispersed by sale in 1843. Two of Williams's manuscripts, now in the British Museum Library (Add. MSS. 21236 and 21237), contain drawings of monuments and inscriptions, from Shropshire churches, 1792–1803, with indexes.

Seven volumes of his manuscripts, which passed from Lord Berwick's possession to that of Sir Thomas Phillipps, were purchased at Sir Thomas Phillipps's sale on 20 May 1897 for the Shrewsbury Free Library; these included a transcript of the cartulary of Haughmond Abbey, with an index of names and places; historical, topographical, and genealogical collections relating to Shropshire (4 volumes folio); and collections (2 volumes folio) for the ‘History of Shropshire.’ Other volumes of Williams's manuscripts were: a transcript of the cartulary of Shrewsbury Abbey, with an index of names and places; transcripts from 154 Shropshire parish registers; a volume of monumental inscriptions, notes of effigies, and extracts from records; and a list of Shropshire plants.
