= Uffington, Shropshire =

Village in Shropshire, England

Coordinates: 52.721°N 2.695°W

Uffington
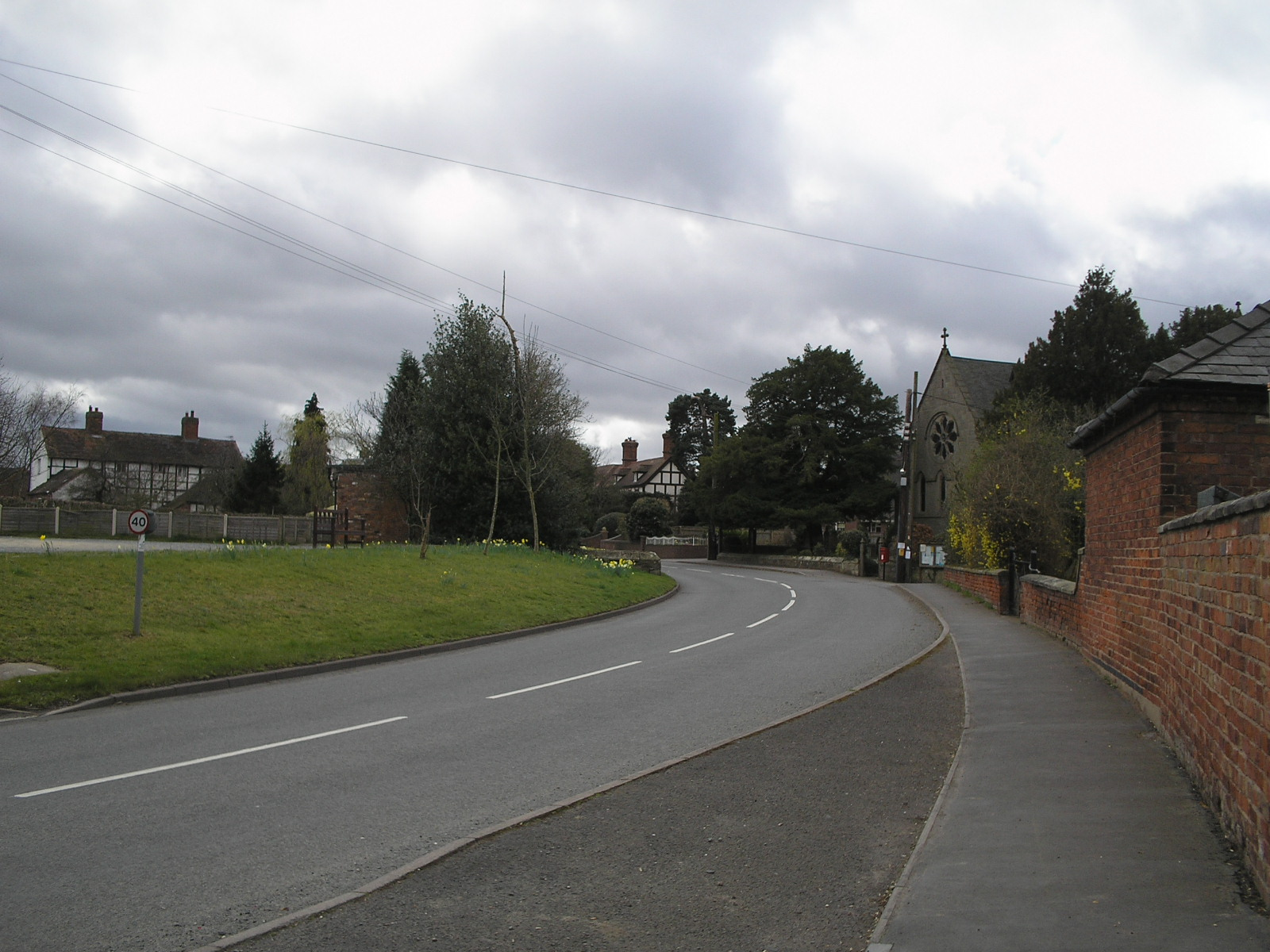
- Uffington village

- Location within Shropshire
- Population: 234 (2011)
- OS grid reference: SJ530139
- Civil parish: Uffington
- Unitary authority: Shropshire
- Ceremonial county: Shropshire
- Region: West Midlands
- Country: England
- Sovereign state: United Kingdom
- Post town: SHREWSBURY
- Postcode district: SY4
- Dialling code: 01743
- Police: West Mercia
- Fire: Shropshire
- Ambulance: West Midlands
- UK Parliament: Shrewsbury and Atcham

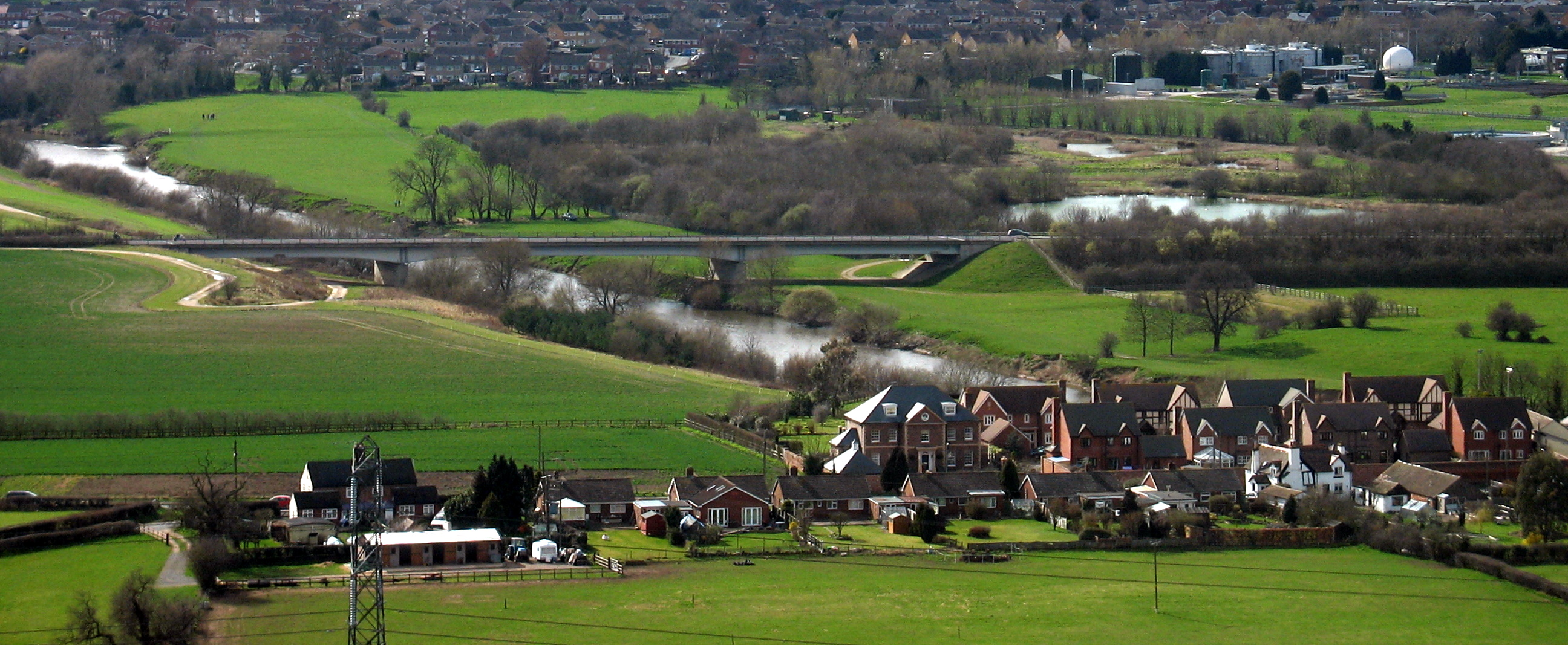
Uffington viewed from Haughmond Hill with the River Severn and A49 road visible.

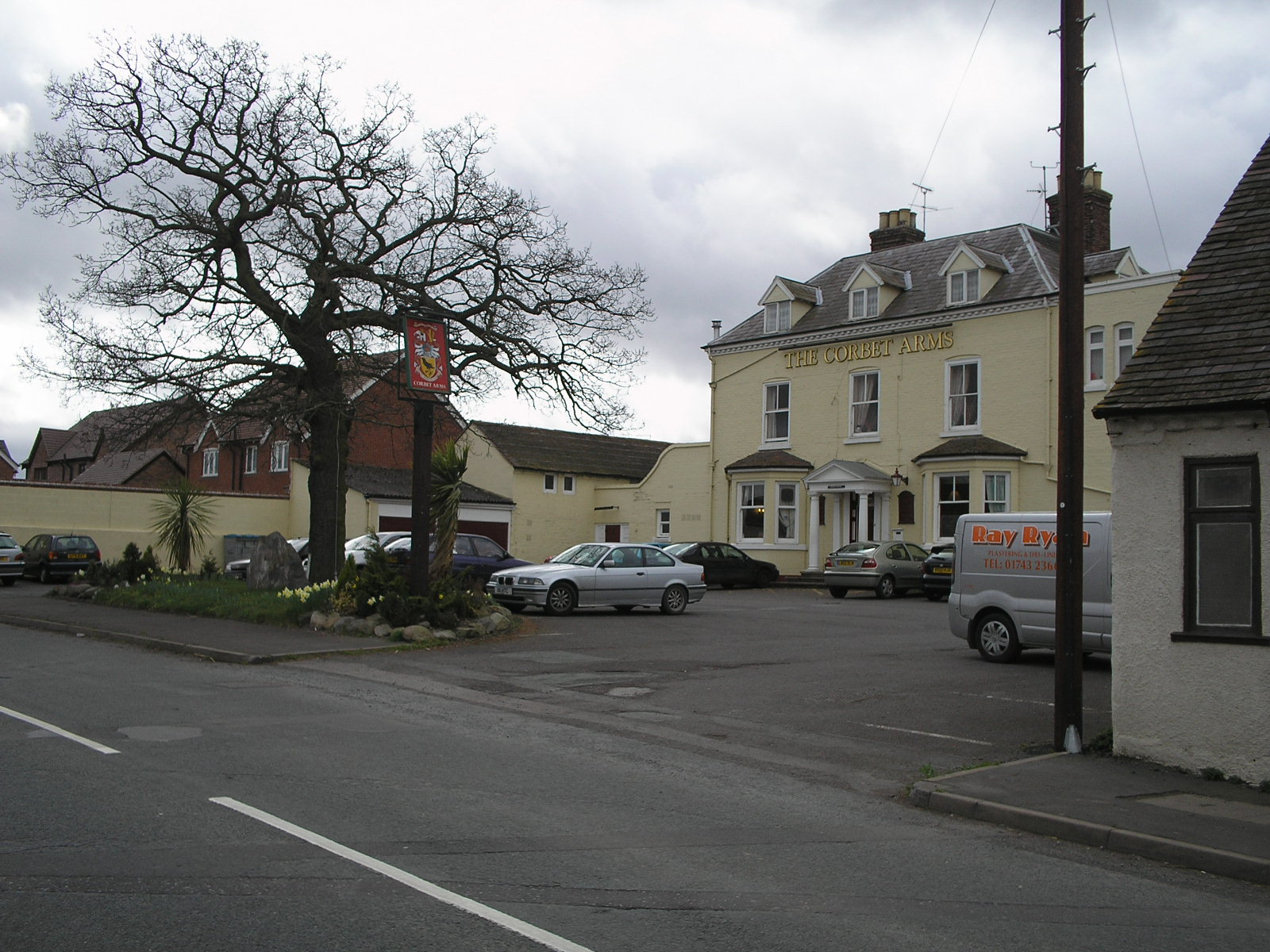
The Corbet Arms in Uffington.

Uffington (/ʌfɪŋtən/) is a village and civil parish in the English county of Shropshire. The population of the civil parish at the 2011 census was 234. It lies between Haughmond Hill and the River Severn, 3 miles east from the town centre of Shrewsbury, at grid reference SJ53151395.

Uffington is home to a church and a pub, the Corbet Arms. The Shrewsbury to Newport Canal once ran through the village. Within the parish lie the grade I listed ruins of Haughmond Abbey.

Antiquary Edward Williams (1762–1833) was perpetual curate of the church from 1786 to his death.

Highway engineer Sir Henry Maybury (1864–1943) was born in Uffington.

The 1997 Grand National winner, Lord Gyllene was trained by Steve Brookshaw in the village.

== See also ==
- Haughmond Abbey
- Sundorne
- Battlefield, Shropshire
- Listed buildings in Uffington, Shropshire
