= Battlefield Heritage Park =

Country park in Shropshire, England

Coordinates: 52.7467°N 2.7315°W

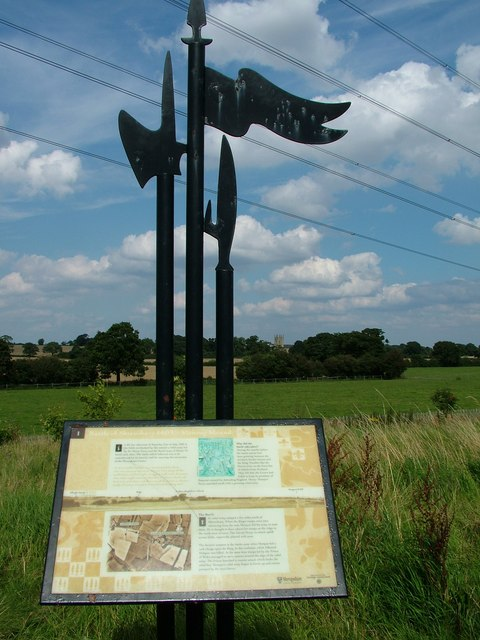
Information sign at Battlefield Heritage Park photo: Roy Haworth, geograph.org.uk

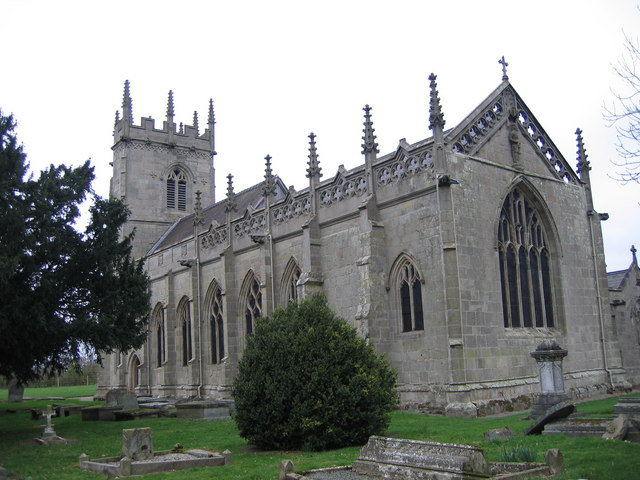
St Mary Magdalene (Battlefield) Church photo: Jeff Buck, geograph.org.uk

Battlefield Heritage Park is a country park situated north of Shrewsbury in Shropshire, in the area known as Battlefield. It marks the supposed site of the 1403 Battle of Shrewsbury fought between King Henry IV and English rebel nobleman Henry Percy.

== History ==
The Battle of Shrewsbury is remembered as one of the bloodiest battles in English history and was fought between King Henry IV (with support from his son Henry Prince of Wales, later to become Henry V) and the rebel Henry Percy (commonly called Harry Hotspur). Battlefield Church – also known as St Mary Magdalene – was built in the fifteenth century to commemorate the battle.

A 1995 report by English Heritage noted that it is unclear if Battlefield Church, which was completed in 1410, marks the centre of the site of the battle, although a large common grave within the church's foundations would suggest the site was associated with the fighting. The church was built at the request of Henry IV, reportedly: "for the souls of those who fell".

The now redundant church and surrounding earthworks are a scheduled ancient monument. The church contains some visitor information. The area considered to be the site of the battle remains almost completely undeveloped, although in use as agricultural land and enclosed by hedges. The A5124 runs near the southern boundary.

== Visitor facilities and information centre ==
Information panels are provided around the site. An exhibition centre known as Battlefield 1403 opened in 2008 close to the church, and includes a café and farm shop. It includes a permissive footpath to the battlefield. There are two wheelchair accessible circular walking routes at the site and new route specifically for families has been created.
