= Richard Brooke (antiquary) =

English antiquary (1791–1861)

Richard Brooke (1791–1861), was an English antiquary.

== Biography ==
Brooke was born in Liverpool in 1791. His father, also named Richard, was a Cheshire man, who settled in Liverpool early in life, and died there on 15 June 1852, at the age of 91. Brooke practised as a solicitor in Liverpool.

Brooke devoted his leisure time to investigations into the history and antiquities of his county, and into certain branches of natural history. He began this pursuit at a comparatively early age, during visits to his brother, Peter, who resided near Stoke Field. He particularly focused on exploring fields of battle in England, especially those which were the scenes of conflict between the rival houses of York and Lancaster. Brooke's primary research goal was to compare the statements of the historians with such relics as had survived and with the traditions of the neighbourhoods where the respective battles had been fought.

Brookes died in Liverpool on 14 June 1861.

== Publications ==
In 1825 he published Observations illustrative of the Accounts given by the Ancient Historical Writers of the Battle of Stoke Field, between King Henry the Seventh and John de la Pole, Earl of Lincoln, in 1487, the last that was fought in the Civil Wars of York and Lancaster; to which are added some interesting particulars of the Illustrious Houses of Plantagenet and Neville (Liverpool, 1825, roy. 8vo).

In later years he carried on his researches, and communicated the result to the Society of Antiquaries, of which he was a member, and to the Liverpool Literary and Philosophical Society, in papers which were subsequently published in a volume in 1857, entitled Visits to Fields of Battle in England in the Fifteenth Century. To which are added some Miscellaneous Tracts and Papers upon Archæological Subjects (8vo). The battlefields described are Shrewsbury, Blore Heath, Northampton, Wakefield, Mortimer's Cross, Towton, Tewkesbury, Bosworth, Stoke, Evesham, and Barnet.

The additional papers published in that volume are:

- On the Use of Firearms by the English in the 15th Century.
- The Family of Wyche, or De la Wyche, in Cheshire.
- Wilmslow Church in Cheshire.
- Handford Hall and Cheadle Church in Cheshire.
- The Office of Keeper of the Royal Menagerie in the Reign of Edward IV.
- The Period of the Extinction of Wolves in England.

The following, in addition to some of those named above, are printed in the Proceedings of the Liverpool Literary and Philosophical Society:

- Upon the extraordinary and abrupt Changes of Fortune of Jasper, earl of Pembroke, vol. x.
- Life of Richard Neville, the Great Earl of Warwick and Salisbury, called the King Maker, xii.
- Life and Character of Margaret of Anjou, xiii.
- Visit to Fotheringay Church and Castle, xiii.
- Migration of the Swallow, xiii.
- On the Elephants used in War by the Carthaginians, xiv.
- On the Common or Fallow Deer of Great Britain, xiv.

In the Transactions of the Historic Society of Lancashire and Cheshire he published Observations on the Inscription of the Common Seal of Liverpool (i. 76), besides the three Cheshire papers reprinted in the volume of visits.

In 1853, he published Liverpool as it was during the Last Quarter of the Eighteenth Century, 1775 to 1800 (Liverpool, roy. 8vo, pp. 558). Much of the information in it came from Brooke's father.
