= Battle of Shrewsbury =

15th-century battle of the Glyndŵr Rising

Coordinates: 52.7475°N 2.7185°W

- Part of the Glyndŵr Rising
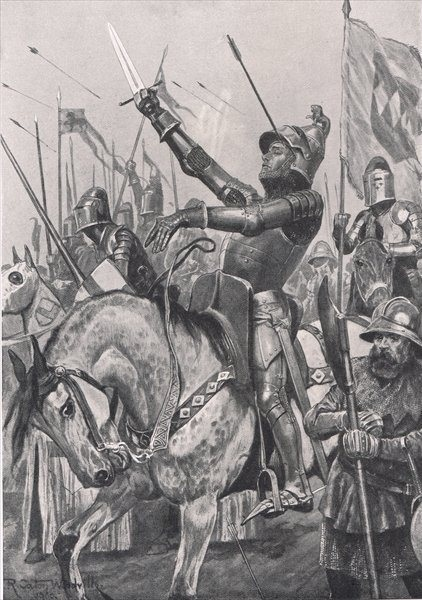
- Death of Henry "Harry Hotspur" Percy, from a 1910 illustration by Richard Caton Woodville Jr.
Date	21 July 1403
Location	Shrewsbury, Shropshire, England
Result	English royalist victory

Belligerents
Kingdom of England	House of Percy; Principality of Wales; Kingdom of Scotland

Commanders and leaders
Henry IV; Prince Henry (WIA); Earl of Stafford †; George Dunbar, 10th Earl of March †	Henry "Hotspur" Percy †; Earl of Worcester (executed); Earl of Douglas (POW)

Strength
14,000	10,000

The Battle of Shrewsbury was fought on 21 July 1403, waged between an army led by the Lancastrian King Henry IV and a rebel army led by Henry "Harry Hotspur" Percy from Northumberland. The battle, the first in which English archers fought each other on English soil, reaffirmed the effectiveness of the longbow and ended the Percy challenge to King Henry IV of England. Part of the fighting is believed to have taken place at what is now Battlefield, Shropshire, England, three miles (5 km) north of the centre of Shrewsbury. It is marked today by Battlefield Church and Battlefield Heritage Park.

== Background ==
During the fight of Henry Bolingbroke, the future King Henry IV, against Richard II of England, Henry was heavily supported by Henry Percy, 1st Earl of Northumberland, Thomas Percy, 1st Earl of Worcester and Henry Percy nicknamed Hotspur. As reward Henry Percy, the Earl of Northumberland, was appointed Constable of England and Warden of the West March; Hotspur Warden of the East March and justiciar of north Wales and Thomas, the Earl of Worcester, was made Admiral of England, and in 1401 steward of the household. When Henry IV launched his campaign in Scotland in 1401, he shifted the immense financial burden onto the nobility of northern England, while later denying them the lucrative ransom payments from the Scottish nobles captured at the Battle of Homildon Hill.

At the same time, a conflict between Owain Glyndŵr, the Lord of Glyndyfrdwy in North Wales, and Lord Grey of Ruthin, a Lancaster supporter and councillor, had escalated into an armed Welsh revolt. When during an English campaign to end the revolt Edmund Mortimer, the brother in law of Hotspur, was captured, the king refused to pay ransom to Glyndŵr. Realising Henry would eventually leave them in the lurch at his convenience the Percies publicly renounced their allegiance to King Henry IV. In a manifesto they charged him with perjury because he claimed the throne in addition to his old lands and titles, raising taxes despite his promise not to and imprisoned and murdered King Richard II.

== Prelude ==
In early July 1403, Hotspur had started the march south to meet his uncle, Thomas Percy at Cheshire, where he began raising an army. When Henry, who was in Burton-on-Trent at the time, learned of the Percies’ betrayal, he marched first to Stafford on July 18, where he spent the night. After receiving word in Stafford that Hotspur was on his way to Shrewsbury, he set his troops in motion on July 20 and reached Shrewsbury, 32 miles away, that very same day, where he was awaited by his son Henry of Monmouth.

At the same time, Hotspur had marched south from Chester. Since the king’s rapid arrival prevented him from entering Shrewsbury, he was forced to change course. He retreated three miles northwest to the village of Berwick for the night. From there, he sent scouts across the River Severn in search of his Welsh allies. The armies of the Percies and their allies were divided into three separate groups, widely scattered: In the north were still considerable forces under the Earl of Northumberland. Somewhere in the southwest lay Glendower’s army; and in between, facing the king’s united army, was Hotspur’s hastily assembled army, consisting mainly of volunteers from Cheshire.

On the morning of July 21, however, the royal army was already closing in. With no further information on the Welsh forces’ whereabouts and to avoid being surrounded with his back to the river, Hotspur began his retreat via Harlescott. He led his men to a ridge located just over 3 miles to the northeast. There he formed his army across a front of about 800 yards, roughly 300 yards north of what is now Battlefield Church. The royal forces pursued the rebels along the same route and eventually took up positions directly opposite them at a distance of 300 to 500 yards. The king’s army, with an estimated 12,000 to 14,000 soldiers, was numerically superior and more tactically cohesive, as the majority of the troops had been brought up together from London. The rebels had around 10,000 men. The king took command of the right wing, whilst his son, Henry of Monmouth, led the division on the left.

== Battle ==
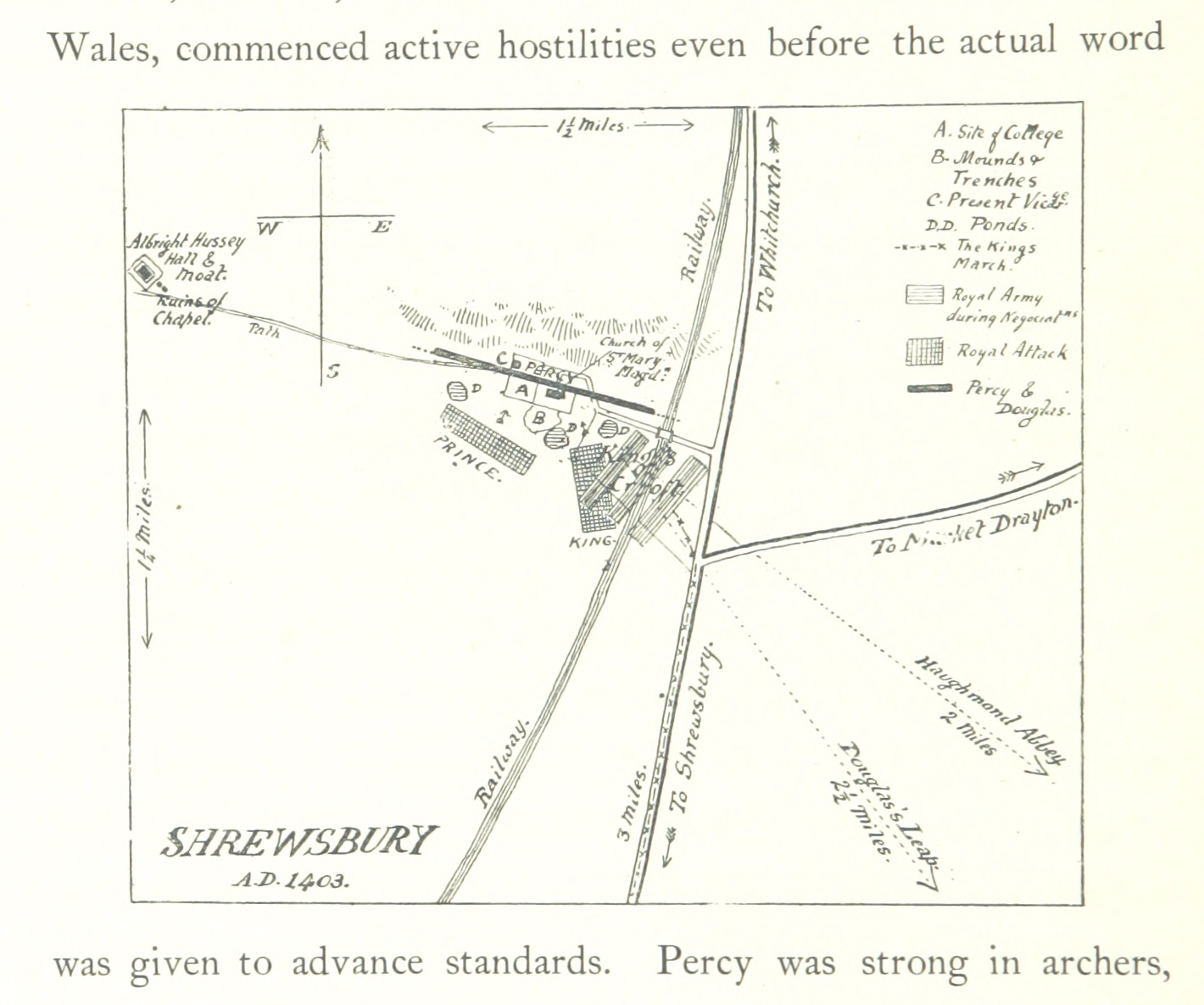
Plan of the battle

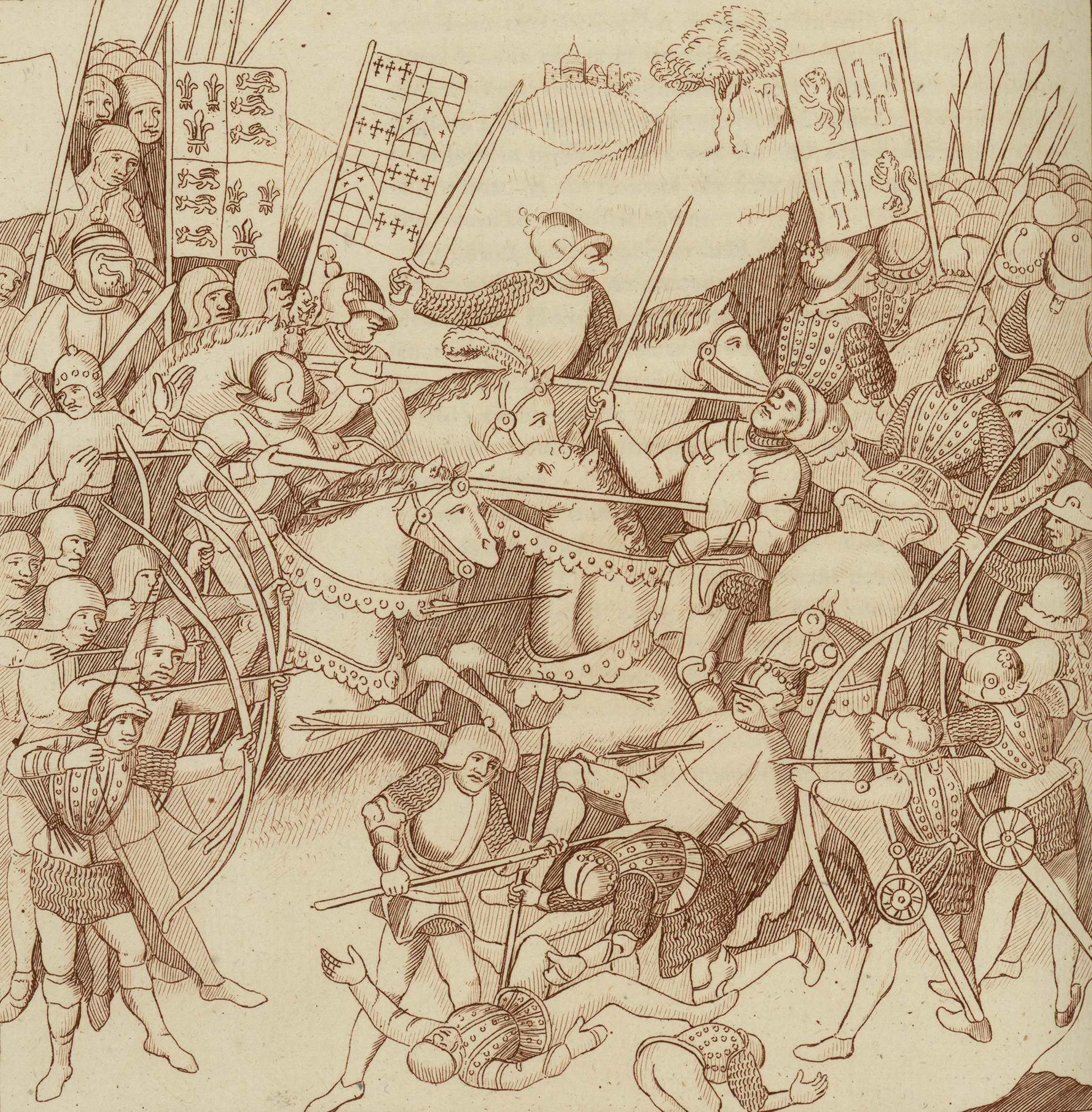
Battle of Shrewsbury, an illustration from Thomas Pennant's 'A tour in Wales', 1781

After several hours of diplomatic mediation by the Abbot of Shrewsbury had failed, the King ordered his troops to attack. When Henry advanced his longbowmen, they were forced to retreat after coming under a hail of arrows from the rebels' expert archers. Hotspur recognised the gap and sent his men-at-arms in pursuit, causing the king's troops to be pushed back a few hundred yards. In the ensuing fierce melee, Hotspur, together with the Scottish Earl of Douglas and a troop of 30 other soldiers, attempted to charge directly at the royal standard to kill the king and thus decide the battle. However, George Dunbar, the Earl of March, recognised the danger in time and led the monarch out of the danger zone. On the left, having only few casualties, the Prince was advancing, driving back Hotspur's right wing. Pursuing the rebels, the army gradually got behind their main body while fighting the King’s division. Since the rebels were outnumbered, they gradually found themselves surrounded, intensifying the melee and confusion. Soon afterwards the Prince was hit by an arrow in the face, six inches deep. At around the same time Hotspur was killed by an arrow. When the news of Hotspur's death spread through the rebel ranks the whole enemy line collapsed and his troops quit the field. Henry launched pursuit that continued for three miles or more. The victory was complete.

== Aftermath ==
Henry Percy was initially buried by his maternal first cousin, Thomas Nevill, 5th Baron Furnivall at Whitchurch, Shropshire, with honours, but rumours soon spread that he was not really dead. In response, the King had him disinterred. His body was salted, set up in Shrewsbury impaled on a spear between two millstones in the marketplace pillory, with an armed guard, and was later quartered and put on display in Chester, London, Bristol and Newcastle upon Tyne. His head was sent to York and impaled on the north gate, looking toward his own lands. In November his remains were returned to his widow Elizabeth. The Earl of Worcester was beheaded and Sir Richard Venables, Sir Richard Vernon and Sir Henry Boynton were publicly hanged, drawn and quartered in Shrewsbury on 23 July and their heads publicly displayed, Thomas Percy's on London Bridge. St Mary Magdalene's Church, Battlefield is said to have been erected over the site of the mass burial pit dug immediately after the battle.

== Bibliography ==
- Burne, Alfred (2001). The Battlefields of England. London: Penguin. ISBN 0-141-39077-8.
- Mortimer, Ian (2008). The Fears of Henry IV : the Life of England's self-made King. London: Vintage books. ISBN 0-795-33543-1.
- Keen, Hugh Maurice (1973). England in the later Middle Ages: a Political History. London: Methuen. ISBN 0-416-75990-4.
- Whitewood, Dickon (2017). Shrewsbury 1403: Struggle for a Fragile Crown. Oxford: Osprey. ISBN 978-1-472-82680-0.
