= Battlefield, Shropshire =

Village and suburb of the town of Shrewsbury in Shropshire, England

Coordinates: 52.747°N 2.718°W

Battlefield
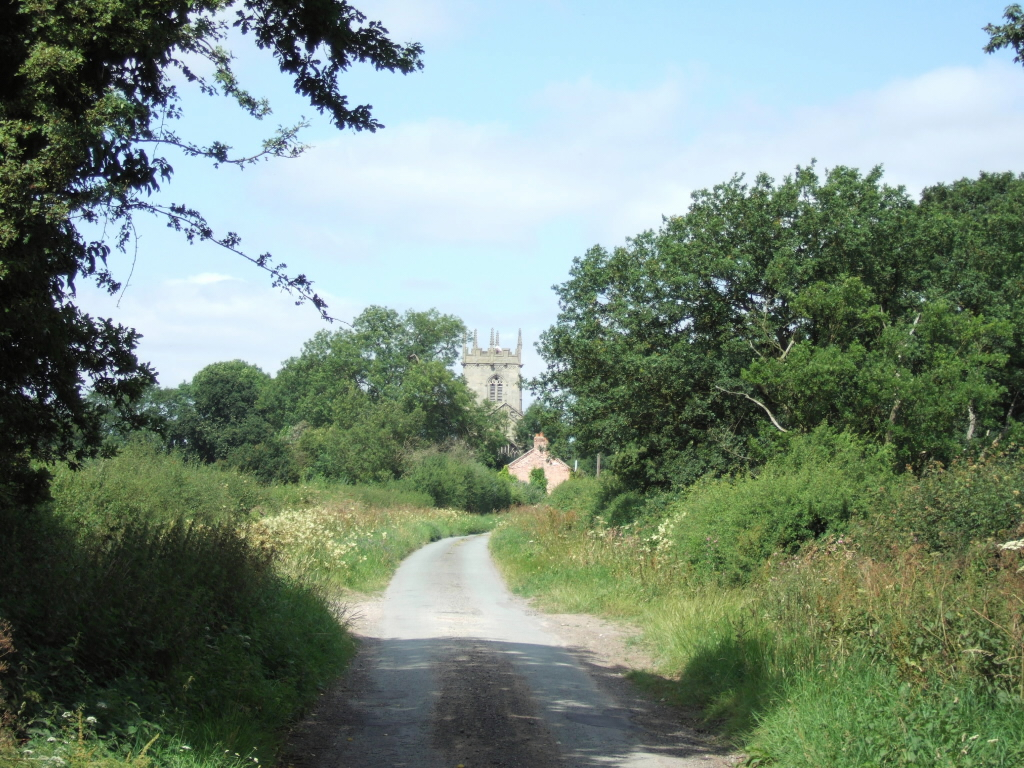
- Battlefield Church and neighbouring cottages

- Location within Shropshire
- OS grid reference: SJ516169
- Civil parish: Shrewsbury; Astley; Bomere Heath and District
- Unitary authority: Shropshire
- Ceremonial county: Shropshire
- Region: West Midlands
- Country: England
- Sovereign state: United Kingdom
- Post town: SHREWSBURY
- Postcode district: SY1
- Dialling code: 01743
- Police: West Mercia
- Fire: Shropshire
- Ambulance: West Midlands
- UK Parliament: Shrewsbury

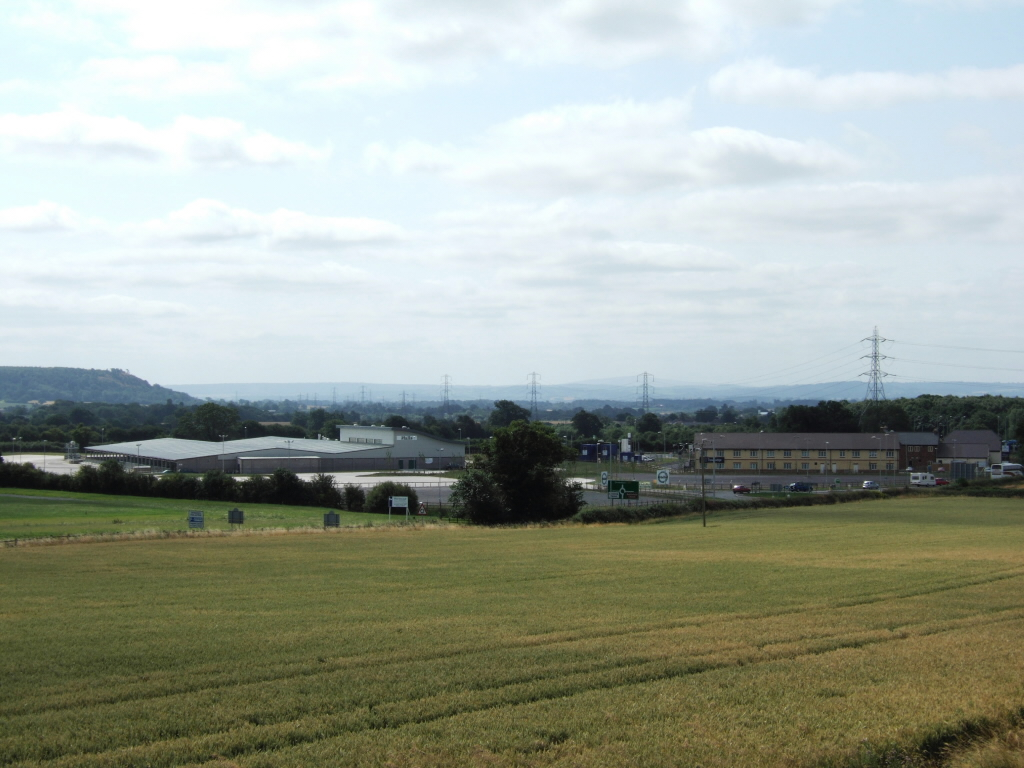
Shrewsbury's new livestock market and A49/A53 service station at Battlefield

Battlefield is a village and suburb of the town of Shrewsbury in Shropshire, England. It is 3 miles (5 km) north of the town centre. The village is today split between three civil parishes - Shrewsbury, Astley and Bomere Heath and District.

== Battle of Shrewsbury ==
It was roughly here that the Battle of Shrewsbury of 1403 took place. A church, commonly known as "Battlefield Church", but officially St. Mary Magdalene Church, was built in memory of the thousands who died.

Today the Battlefield Heritage Park is a visitor attraction, commemorating and interpreting the battle site.

== Modern day Battlefield ==
The A49 runs through Battlefield, on its way from Shrewsbury to Whitchurch, as does the Welsh Marches Line (the Shrewsbury to Crewe railway line). The A53 begins its route at Battlefield.

Battlefield has two pubs. The Red Lion is the elder pub, and The Two Henrys is to the north of the Battlefield roundabout, as is St Mary Magdalene's Church, which lies just off the A49.

=== Expansion of Shrewsbury ===
The town of Shrewsbury has over the past 10 years grown substantially in this area and the village is now part of the town. It is however split by a large Shrewsbury bypass roundabout ("Battlefield Roundabout"), one of the busiest in the county town.

The new Shrewsbury livestock market and a small hotel and service station has been built just off the A53 near the Battlefield Roundabout.

An industrial and business estate, the Battlefield Enterprise Park, has grown up in between the older Shrewsbury suburb of Harlescott and Battlefield. It is located on the site of the Battle of Shrewsbury and the village of Battlefield is nearby. A large part of the battlefield is, however, protected as a heritage site. Even so, the Battlefield Link Road (the A5124) runs straight through it and a car park has been built for visitors. The first businesses moved in during the mid-1990s, though the park became more established later that decade when the Battlefield Link Road, the A5124, was built. The park is near the A49 and A53 and it is also adjacent to the Welsh Marches Line.

== Governance ==
Battlefield is as an electoral ward of Shrewsbury Town Council and also Shropshire Council. The population of this ward at the 2011 census was 4,193.

In 1931 the civil parish had a population of 204. On 1 April 1934 the parish was abolished and merged with Albrighton and Shrewsbury.

== See also ==
- Upper Battlefield
- Haughmond Hill, a nearby wood and landmark
