= Walford, Shropshire =

Village in Shropshire, England

Coordinates: 52.780°N 2.839°W

Walford
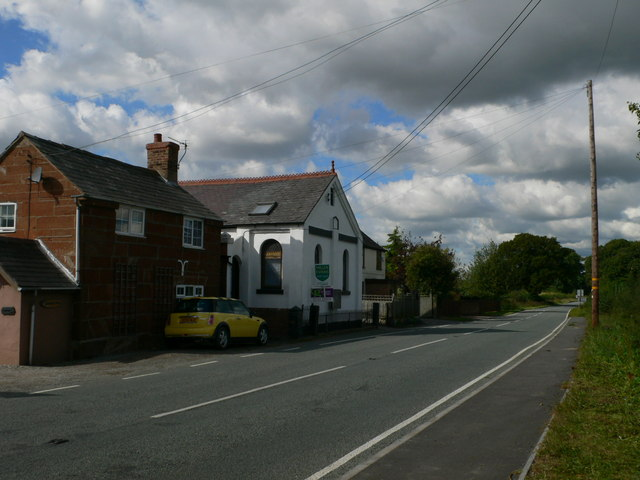
- Walford Heath, Shropshire

- Location within Shropshire
- OS grid reference: SJ434206
- Civil parish: Baschurch
- Unitary authority: Shropshire
- Ceremonial county: Shropshire
- Region: West Midlands
- Country: England
- Sovereign state: United Kingdom
- Post town: SHREWSBURY
- Postcode district: SY4
- Dialling code: 01939
- Police: West Mercia
- Fire: Shropshire
- Ambulance: West Midlands
- UK Parliament: North Shropshire

Walford is a village in the civil parish of Baschurch, in Shropshire, England.

It is notable for its agricultural college (Walford and North Shropshire College). The B5067, Shrewsbury to Baschurch road, runs through the village.

The southern part, known as Walford Heath, is situated at the crossroads of the B5067 road with the Merrington to Yeaton lane. The speed limit here has recently been reduced to 40 mph. There are a number of commercial premises and a post box.

Immediately to the east of Walford Heath lies the hamlet of Old Woods.

== See also ==
- Listed buildings in Baschurch
