= Old Woods =

Hamlet in Shropshire, England

Coordinates: 52.777°N 2.813°W

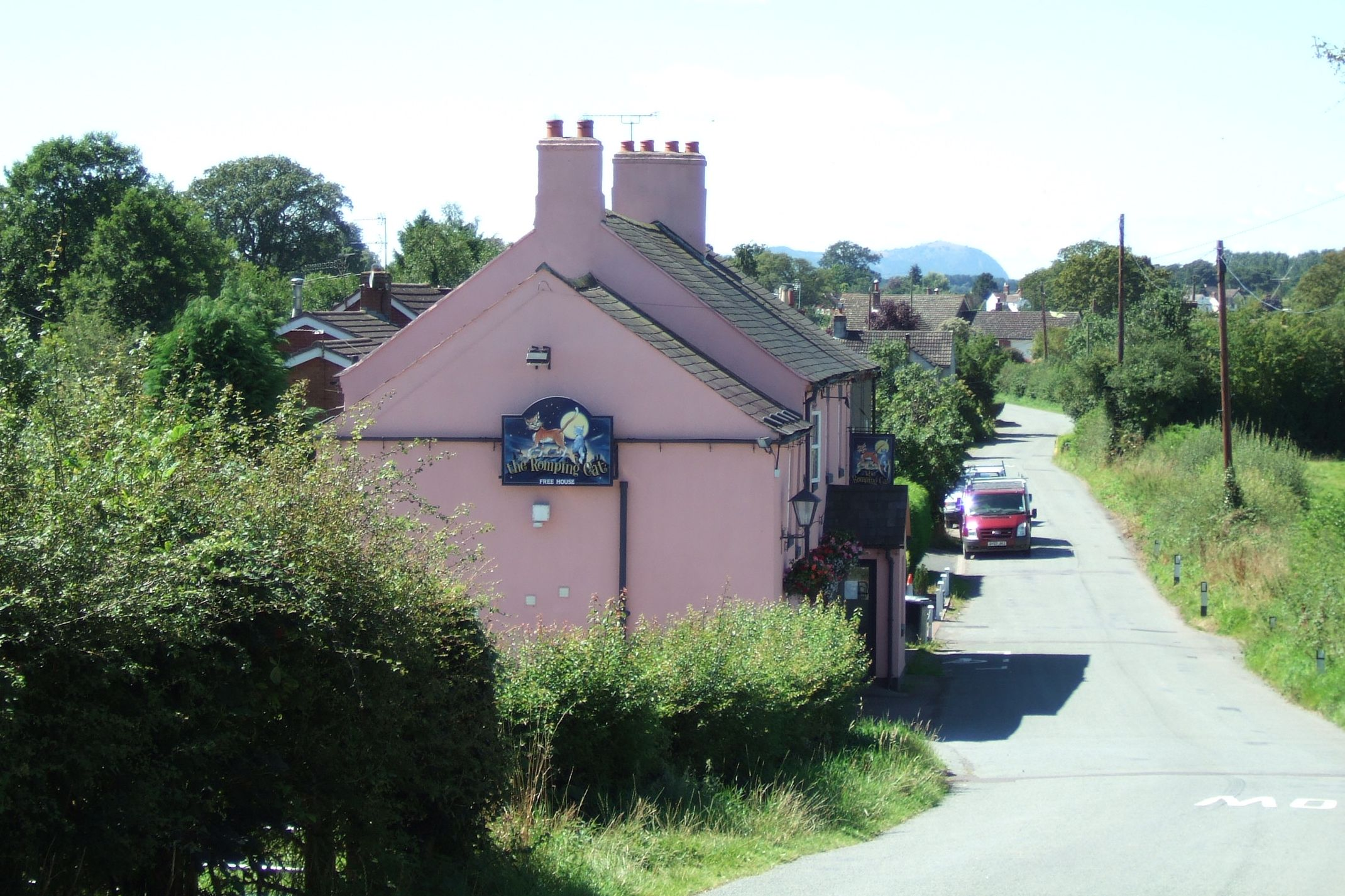
- Old Woods

- Location within Shropshire
- OS grid reference: SJ451202
- Civil parish: Baschurch
- Unitary authority: Shropshire
- Ceremonial county: Shropshire
- Region: West Midlands
- Country: England
- Sovereign state: United Kingdom
- Post town: Shrewsbury
- Postcode district: SY4
- Dialling code: 01939
- Police: West Mercia
- Fire: Shropshire
- Ambulance: West Midlands
- UK Parliament: Shrewsbury and Atcham

Old Woods is a hamlet in the civil parish of Baschurch, in Shropshire, England, located 4 miles (6.4 km) to the north-west of Shrewsbury. It is alternatively known and spelt as Oldwood, Oldwoods and Old Wood.

== Situation ==
It is situated on a lane between the small villages of Merrington (to the east) and Walford (to the west). Another large nearby village is Bomere Heath. The B5067, Shrewsbury to Baschurch road, runs to the west of the settlement.

The centre of the hamlet lies at 89m above sea level, with the ground rising towards the northwest (towards Merrington Green) and in this direction lie two sizeable woodlands: Old Wood and Oldwood Coppice.

The dialling code for here is 01939 and the postcode is SY4 3xx.

== Amenities ==
A frequent Monday-Saturday bus service (presently the 576) connects Old Woods with Oswestry, Baschurch, Bomere Heath and Shrewsbury. There is also a letter box in the hamlet.

== History ==
There was once a small brick and pipe works, with its own clay pit, in the hamlet, as well as associated railway sidings. The Shrewsbury to Chester Line runs through the hamlet and was constructed in 1846. In 1933 a halt was established here on the railway line - Oldwoods Halt - which closed to passengers in 1960 and for goods in 1964. This former industrial/railway activity took place to the north of the railway bridge and little remains to be seen today. The nearest railway stations currently are Yorton and Shrewsbury.
