= Colin Bloomfield =

British radio personality

- Born: 22 February 1982; Montford Bridge, Shropshire, England
- Died: 25 April 2015 (aged 33); Shropshire, England
- Occupation: Radio personality
- Years active: 2005–2015
- Known for: Coverage of Derby County F.C. for BBC Radio Derby

Colin Bloomfield (22 February 1982 – 25 April 2015) was an English radio personality best known for his coverage of Derby County F.C. on BBC Radio Derby, as a presenter, reporter and commentator. Following his terminal prognosis for melanoma, he became an activist and fundraiser, setting up an eponymous appeal to educate children about the illness.

== Early life and media career ==
Bloomfield was born in Montford Bridge, Shropshire. His father Lawrie was the first managing editor of BBC Radio Shropshire after it was founded in 1985. He attended Bicton School, The Corbet School in Baschurch, Shrewsbury Sixth Form College and the University of Central Lancashire in Preston. Bloomfield spent ten years working at BBC Radio Derby. A fan of his local team Shrewsbury Town, he was best known for his radio coverage of Derby County, but also presented content on other issues, including interviewing the Prime Minister, David Cameron.

== Illness ==
In 2001, Bloomfield discovered changes in a mole, which turned out to be a melanoma. It was removed from his leg, and he was given an all-clear in 2006. However, in 2013, it returned. The following year, after it metastasised to his lungs, he was told that he had months to live. He remained open and optimistic despite his illness.

In February 2015, he initiated the Colin Bloomfield Melanoma Appeal in conjunction with BBC Radio Derby, the Derby Telegraph and charity Skcin. The appeal aims to educate children on prevention of melanoma. On 31 March, it reached its initial target of £45,000 after a £10,000 donation from the city's Freemasons, and a new target of £75,000 was set. Derby County had raised £14,000 for it with £10 from every away ticket sold for their fixture against Norwich City.

Former England footballer and manager Kevin Keegan gave a presentation at Derby County's Pride Park which raised £600 for the appeal in April. Former footballer Jimmy Greaves and comedian Bobby Davro also gave performances for the appeal. The Derby Brewing Company made a new beer in honour of former Derby County player Dave Mackay, who had died earlier that year, with some of the profits going to the appeal.

== Death ==
Bloomfield died at a hospice near his family home on 25 April 2015, aged 33. Later that day, Shrewsbury Town achieved promotion to League One, which they dedicated to Bloomfield and to Lloyd Burton, an eleven-year-old fan who had died of a brain tumour earlier that week.

Bloomfield's funeral was held on 13 May, at St Chad's Church, Shrewsbury, with his coffin endowed with a Shrewsbury Town flag and Derby County scarf. Shrewsbury manager Micky Mellon read from the Bible, and former Derby player Roger Davies and Derbyshire-born Olympic swimmer Ross Davenport were among the mourners.

By the time of his funeral, Bloomfield's appeal had raised over £100,000. It operates a free mobile mole-checking service around the Derby area, and of 500 people it had checked, 28 were given urgent referrals to doctors.
