= Grafton, Shropshire =

Hamlet in Shropshire, England

Coordinates: 52.765°N 2.844°W

Grafton
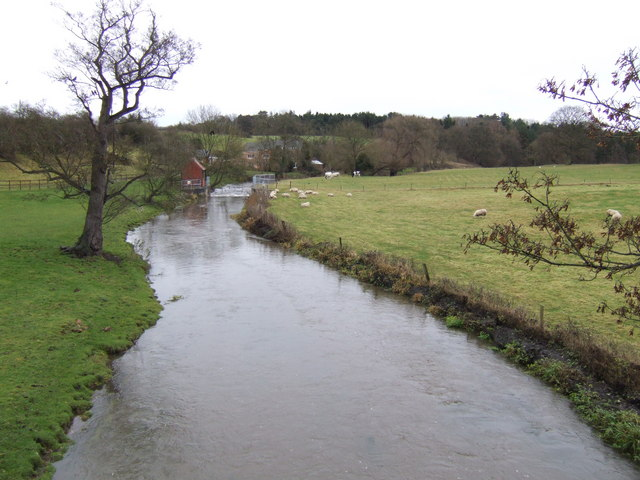
- Bridge over the Perry between the hamlets of Yeaton and Grafton. Grafton is on the right-hand (southern) bank in this view.

- Location within Shropshire
- OS grid reference: SJ430189
- Civil parish: Bomere Heath and District
- Unitary authority: Shropshire
- Ceremonial county: Shropshire
- Region: West Midlands
- Country: England
- Sovereign state: United Kingdom
- Post town: SHREWSBURY
- Postcode district: SY4
- Dialling code: 01939
- Police: West Mercia
- Fire: Shropshire
- Ambulance: West Midlands
- UK Parliament: Shrewsbury and Atcham

Grafton is a hamlet in the civil parish of Bomere Heath and District, in Shropshire, England. Its name probably refers to a coppiced wood.

It is situated to the northwest of Shrewsbury. The River Perry flows by to the north, and on the other side is the small village of Yeaton.
