= Weston Lullingfields =

Coordinates: 52.818°N 2.851°W

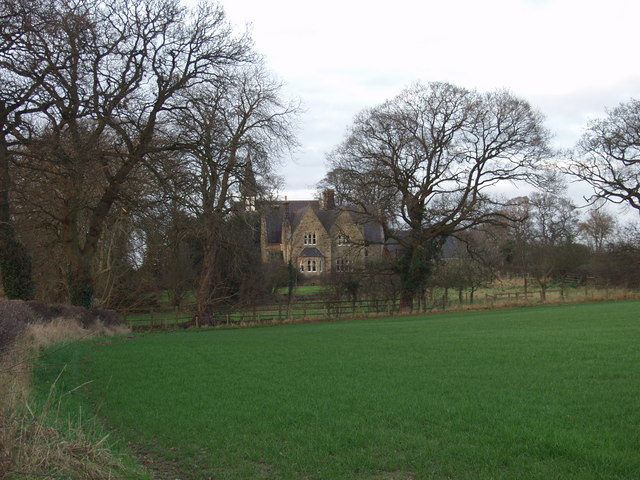
- The old vicarage and village church (turret visible behind the house) at Weston Lullingfields

- Location within Shropshire
- OS grid reference: SJ426248
- Civil parish: Baschurch
- Unitary authority: Shropshire
- Ceremonial county: Shropshire
- Region: West Midlands
- Country: England
- Sovereign state: United Kingdom
- Post town: SHREWSBURY
- Postcode district: SY4
- Dialling code: 01939
- Police: West Mercia
- Fire: Shropshire
- Ambulance: West Midlands
- UK Parliament: North Shropshire

Weston Lullingfields is a village in Shropshire, England. It is located about 15 km north west of Shrewsbury. The population as taken at the 2011 census can be found under Baschurch.

== Etymology ==
The village name 'Weston' is a common one in England. It is Anglo Saxon in origin and means 'west farm'.

== Canal ==
Weston Lullingfields was a terminus of a branch of the Ellesmere Canal known as the Weston Branch. The canal was originally intended to continue on to Shrewsbury, but was never completed as intended. At Weston Lullingfields the canal company built a wharf, four lime kilns, a public house, stables, a clerk's house and weighing machine. These were opened in 1797 and closed in 1917 when the Weston branch was closed following a breach of the canal.

== See also ==
- Listed buildings in Baschurch
