= Suzanne Evans =

British politician

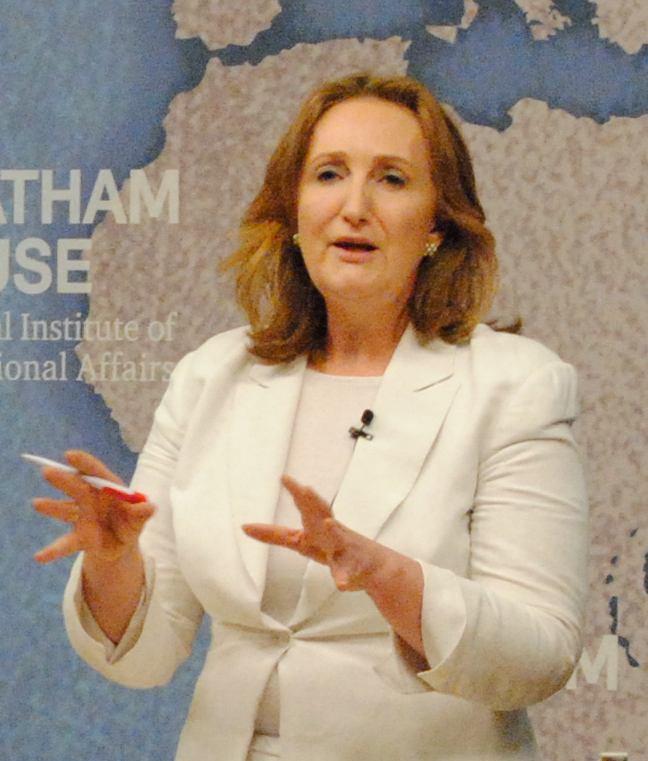
- Evans in 2016

Head of the UKIP Policy Committee
- In office 29 November 2016 – 11 June 2017
- Leader: Paul Nuttall
- Preceded by: Mark Reckless
- Succeeded by: Margot Parker

Deputy Chair of the UK Independence Party
- In office 29 November 2016 – 11 June 2017 Serving with The Earl of Dartmouth
- Leader: Paul Nuttall
- Preceded by: Diane James
- Succeeded by: The Earl of Dartmouth (Note: as sole Deputy Chair)
- In office 4 August 2014 – 24 February 2016 Serving with Neil Hamilton
- Leader: Nigel Farage
- Preceded by: Office established
- Succeeded by: Diane James

UKIP Spokesperson for Health
- In office 1 December 2016 – 11 June 2017
- Leader: Paul Nuttall
- Preceded by: Louise Bours
- Succeeded by: Julia Reid

Personal details
- Born: February 1965 (age 61)
- Party: Conservative (before 2013); UK Independence Party (2013–2018)
- Education: Lancaster University

Suzanne Elizabeth Evans (born February 1965) is an English journalist and politician, formerly associated with the UK Independence Party (UKIP).

On 6 May 2010, Evans was elected as a Conservative councillor in the London Borough of Merton Council. She resigned the Conservative whip on 15 May 2013, and then became a councillor with UKIP from 29 May 2013 to 22 May 2014.

Evans was Deputy Chair of UKIP from 2014 to 2016 and 2016 to 2017, with Neil Hamilton and later The Earl of Dartmouth. She was suspended from the party between March and September 2016, and was unable to run in its September 2016 leadership election before being re-appointed to the post of Deputy Chairman by Paul Nuttall. She was one of the three candidates in the party's November 2016 leadership election. She was a spokeswoman for the party and the co-author of its election manifesto in 2015 and 2017. She resigned from the party in December 2018, over the appointment of Stephen Yaxley-Lennon as an advisor to party leader Gerard Batten.

Evans stood as the UKIP candidate in the Shrewsbury and Atcham constituency in the 2015 general election.

== Early life ==
Suzanne Elizabeth Evans was born in February 1965. Her father ran a watchmaking firm in Roushill in Shrewsbury, and her mother was a teacher.

Evans was educated at Baschurch Secondary Modern School, a state school in the village of Baschurch in Shropshire, now known as the Corbet School, and then at Shrewsbury Sixth Form College. She attended Lancaster University (1985–1987), from which she graduated with a BA in Religious Studies.

== Media career ==
Evans trained as a journalist with the BBC and worked for BBC Radio in various roles from 1987 to 1999. On BBC Radio 4, these included being a reporter and presenter on the Sunday programme, and a reporter for Woman's Hour and for the Today programme.

She also worked for BBC Radio 5, for the BBC World Service, and also in several roles on BBC Local Radio.

Since January 2000, Evans has worked as a freelance public relations (PR) and marketing consultant, as Suzanne Evans Communications. She was also communications director at Aquarius PR from March 2006 to May 2013.

== Political life ==
Evans began her political career as a member of Merton London Borough Council, elected in May 2010. She was elected as a Conservative councillor but resigned from the party in May 2013, citing a "poisonous war" within the party. She switched her allegiance to the UK Independence Party, but lost her seat a year later.

She soon became UKIP's deputy chairwoman and head of policy, serving between July 2014 and February 2016. She was primarily responsible for writing the UKIP 2015 manifesto, having taken over the job from Tim Aker. Her success in producing a coherent and credible platform, following the debacle of the party's 2010 manifesto, and her confident presentation of the completed document, prompted speculation that she might stand for leader of the party were Nigel Farage to resign after the 2015 general election. She was obliged to deny that any such bid was contemplated.

In 2014, Evans blamed poor UKIP support in London on the city's high number of "educated, cultured and young". She explained that she thought that in London, voters were "more likely, I think, to have read some of the negative press that's been about us, and I think they'd be more likely to believe it" whereas outside London people were more cynical about media reporting. In April 2015, Evans blamed the British housing shortage on increased demand caused by mass migration, a theory also repeated by Nigel Farage in election debates.

Evans was the UKIP candidate for the Shrewsbury and Atcham constituency in the 2015 general election, finishing third with 14.4% of the total vote.

=== After the 2015 general election ===
On 8 May 2015, Nigel Farage recommended her as the Interim Leader of UKIP following his resignation, but within three days the National Executive Committee of the party had rejected the Farage resignation, and so he remained leader.

On 18 June 2015, following comments made by Evans on the BBC's Daily Politics, Evans commented that the public had a "perceived divisive" view of Nigel Farage. The UKIP press office then withdrew Evans as a media commentator for UKIP, pending an internal inquiry.

On 23 March 2016, while still on the UKIP party list for the 2016 London Assembly election, Evans was suspended for six months from the party by UKIP's internal disciplinary committee. She, in turn, began legal action in the High Court against the decision, on the grounds that rules were allegedly being abused. Her six-month suspension from the party lapsed on 23 September.

=== UKIP leadership bid ===
Evans launched her bid to become leader of UKIP in October 2016, following the resignation of Diane James after 18 days in the job. Launching her campaign on The Andrew Marr Show, Evans said she'd be the "strong centre" and described herself and fellow candidate Paul Nuttall as "Team Sensible" compared to fellow candidate Raheem Kassam, following extreme comments from the soon-to-resign leadership candidate. When the results were announced, on 28 November 2016, she came a distant second out of the remaining three, and lost her deposit with 19.3% of the vote.

== Charity work ==
Evans founded the Lipoedema UK charity in 2011, after discovering that she suffers from the condition.
