= James Gale =

James Gale may refer to:

- James Gale, founder of Gale & Polden, British printer and publisher
- James Gale (cricketer) (born 1986), cricketer for Guernsey
- James Scarth Gale (1863–1937), Canadian Presbyterian missionary, educator and Bible translator in Korea
- James Morris Gale, Scottish civil engineer
- James Gale (footballer), English footballer

== See also ==
- Jamie Gale, New Zealand sailor
