= BBC Radio Derby =

BBC Local Radio station for Derbyshire

Coordinates: 52.92643°N 1.48209°W

- Derby; England
- Broadcast area: Derbyshire and East Staffordshire
- Frequencies: FM: 95.3 MHz (Peak District); FM: 96.0 MHz (Buxton); FM: 104.5 MHz (Derby, Burton upon Trent and Uttoxeter); AM: 1116 kHz (Burnaston) (until the end of November 2026); DAB: 10B; Freeview: 717
- RDS: BBCDERBY

Programming
- Language: English
- Format: Local news, talk and music

Ownership
- Owner: BBC Local Radio, BBC East Midlands, BBC West Midlands, BBC Yorkshire

History
- First air date: 29 April 1971

Technical information
- Licensing authority: Ofcom

Links
- Website: BBC Radio Derby

BBC Radio Derby is the BBC's local radio station serving Derbyshire and East Staffordshire.

It broadcasts on FM, AM (until the end of November 2026), DAB, digital TV and via BBC Sounds from studios on St Helens Street in Derby.

According to RAJAR, the station has a weekly audience of 95,000 listeners as of May 2025.

== Overview ==
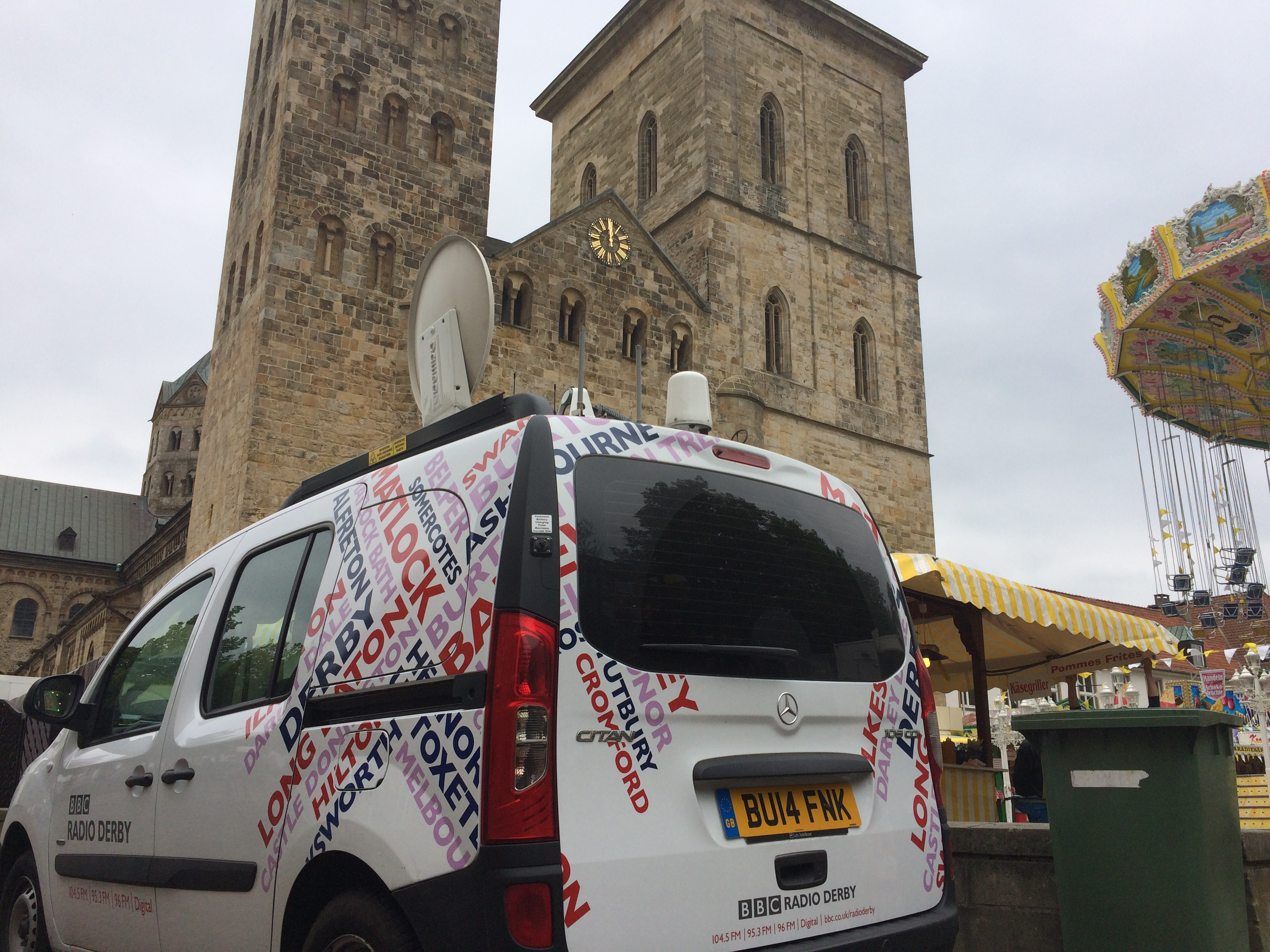
BBC Radio Derby's satellite van pictured in Osnabrück - Derby's twin city

BBC Radio Derby began broadcasting officially on 29 April 1971, though it went on air two months earlier than planned to cover the bankruptcy of the local aero-engine manufacturer Rolls-Royce. The station's logo was a Rams head in the late 1980s and early 1990s.

Much of the station's output is speech based, featuring news, sport, weather, travel, interviews, and discussions, mixed in with music and competitions. The station's primary audience is aimed at listeners aged over 45, though the sports and weekend shows attract a greater age range.

BBC Radio Derby Sport broadcasts live match commentaries from local football teams, especially Derby County and Burton Albion. There is also extensive coverage of Derbyshire cricket during the summer.

The station won the prestigious "Station of the Year" award in the category for radio stations that serve between 300,000 and 1 million listeners at the Sony Radio Academy Awards in 2007, 2010 and 2011, becoming the first BBC local radio station to win it three times. Also, in both 2017 and 2009, Radio Derby was named Station of the Year in the BBC local radio station Gillard awards.

== Technical ==
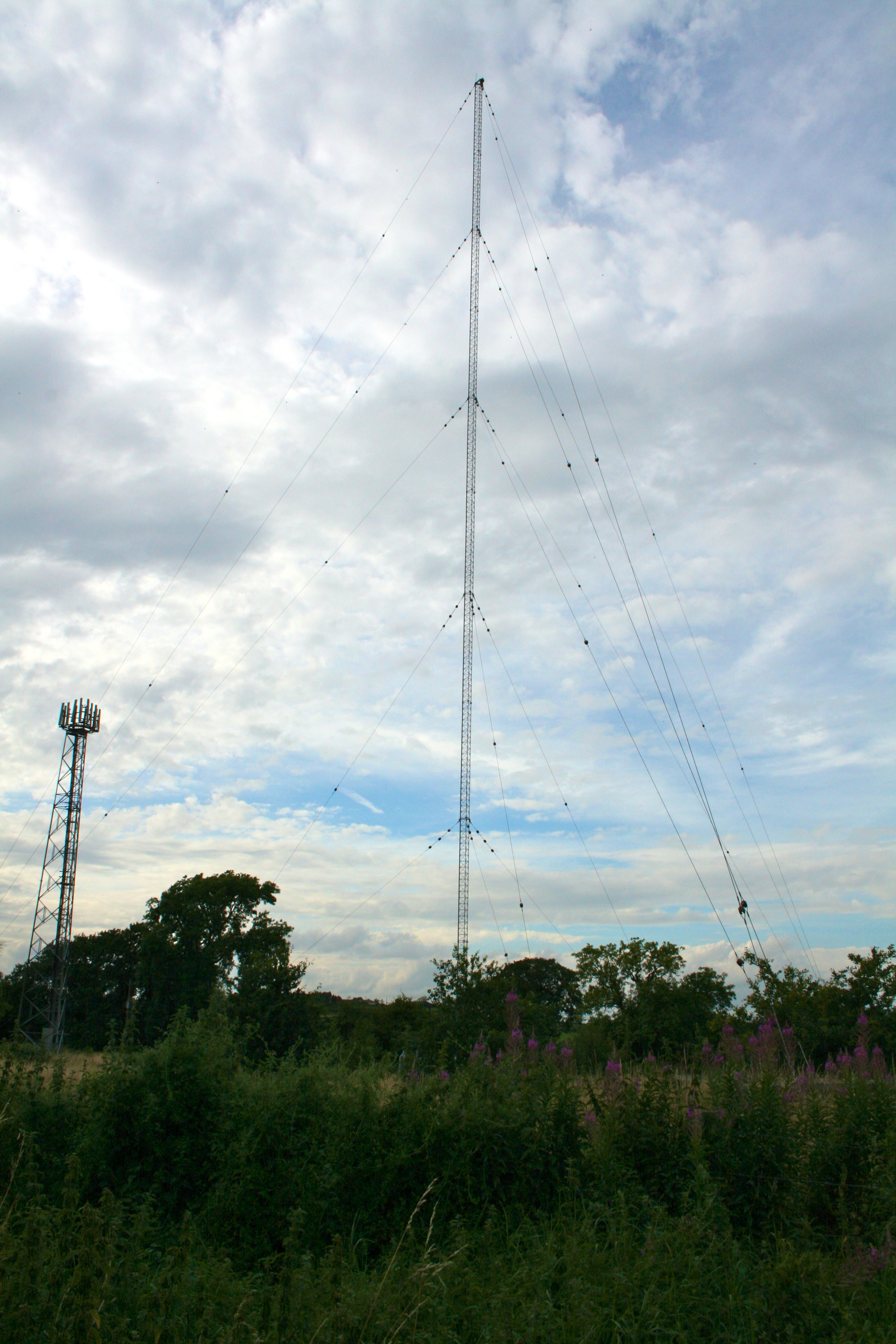
BBC Radio Derby's medium wave transmitter at Burnaston.

104.5 MHz FM is the primary frequency for BBC Radio Derby, and comes from a 200 ft FM transmitting mast on Drum Hill, four miles north of the Derby City Centre, the other side of the A38 from Little Eaton, next to a Scout camp. This service used to come from the Sutton Coldfield transmitter. There is a second FM transmitter for the Bakewell and Matlock areas based at Stanton Moor on 95.3 MHz FM, and a third FM transmitter, which is relay of that frequency for the Buxton area on 96.0 MHz FM.

Chesterfield, although located in Derbyshire, is served by BBC Radio Sheffield which has a dedicated relay transmitter in the town. Likewise, the north-western portion of the county taking in Glossop, Chapel-en-le-Frith, and Whaley Bridge, is served by BBC Radio Manchester.

In addition, all of BBC Radio Derby's area is served via its medium wave service on 1116 kHz (269 metres), which comes from its single 500W AM transmitter site at Burnaston, just south of the city, close to the Toyota car plant. However, as part of the final phase of BBC Local Radio's switch-offs of medium wave transmitters, these transmissions will cease at the end of November 2026.

The station broadcasts on DAB via the multiplex known as NOW Derbyshire. A local Derbyshire DAB licence was advertised by OFCOM in January 2007, and was awarded to "Now Digital" with an "on air" date originally planned for July 2008, which was delayed until July 2014. The multiplex is transmitted from five transmitter sites; Drum Hill, Tibshelf, Stanton Moor, and Lichfield. There are also long-term plans for further transmitters at Buxton, Ashbourne, and Glossop.

The station also broadcasts on Freeview TV channel 717 in the BBC East Midlands, BBC West Midlands and BBC Yorkshire regions.

=== Other output ===
BBC Radio Derby also streams online, to internet radios and via BBC Sounds where programmes from the past 28 days are available to listen.

A short news bulletin is available on smart speakers.

The football focused evening programme is available as a podcast called 'Rams Daily'.

News items, videos, audio clips and photos are posted on Twitter to the general @BBCDerby account, and on the Facebook page with the same handle. Sports related updates are posted on Twitter to the @BBCDerbySport account.

== Programming ==
Local programming is produced and broadcast from the BBC's Derby studios from 6 am to 2 pm on Mondays to Fridays with all other programming since 2023, apart from sports coverage, being regional or national, and during the overnight downtime, BBC Radio Derby simulcasts BBC Radio 5 Live.

== Presenters ==
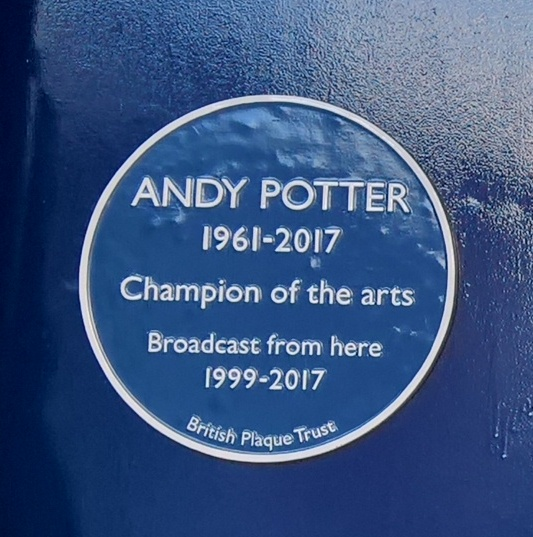
Blue plaque on Radio Derby's building.

=== Notable former presenters ===
- Colin Bloomfield
- Mike Carey
- Terry Christian
- Ross Fletcher
- James Whale
- Alastair Yates

== Branding ==
The station's jingles have varied greatly over the years as trends in music and technology have changed; indeed, the jingle that plays prior to every hourly news bulletin (one of a new batch of tunes introduced in January 2017), features the slogan, On Radio, TV and Mobile - this is BBC Radio Derby; a reflection of the different ways in which the station's output can be heard these days. In the mid-1980s, the station's slogan was "Rise and shine on 269!"; the '269' referring to the 269 metres wavelength of the 1116 kHz medium wave frequency. This slogan formed the basis of many jingles in this era, but was phased out in the 1990s as FM listening increased. Nowadays, only the actual frequency of the medium wave signal (1116 MW) is mentioned on the station.

From the commencement of the 96 FM frequency for the Buxton area until April 2007, the jingles were provided by Bespoke Music of Penryn, Cornwall (being exactly the same as BBC Radio Wiltshire). From 2007 to 2011, jingles were provided by Wise Buddah Productions of London. Then there were Mcasso jingles from 2011 until 2020. Currently, jingles are provided by Reelworld.

== Colin Bloomfield Sun Meter ==
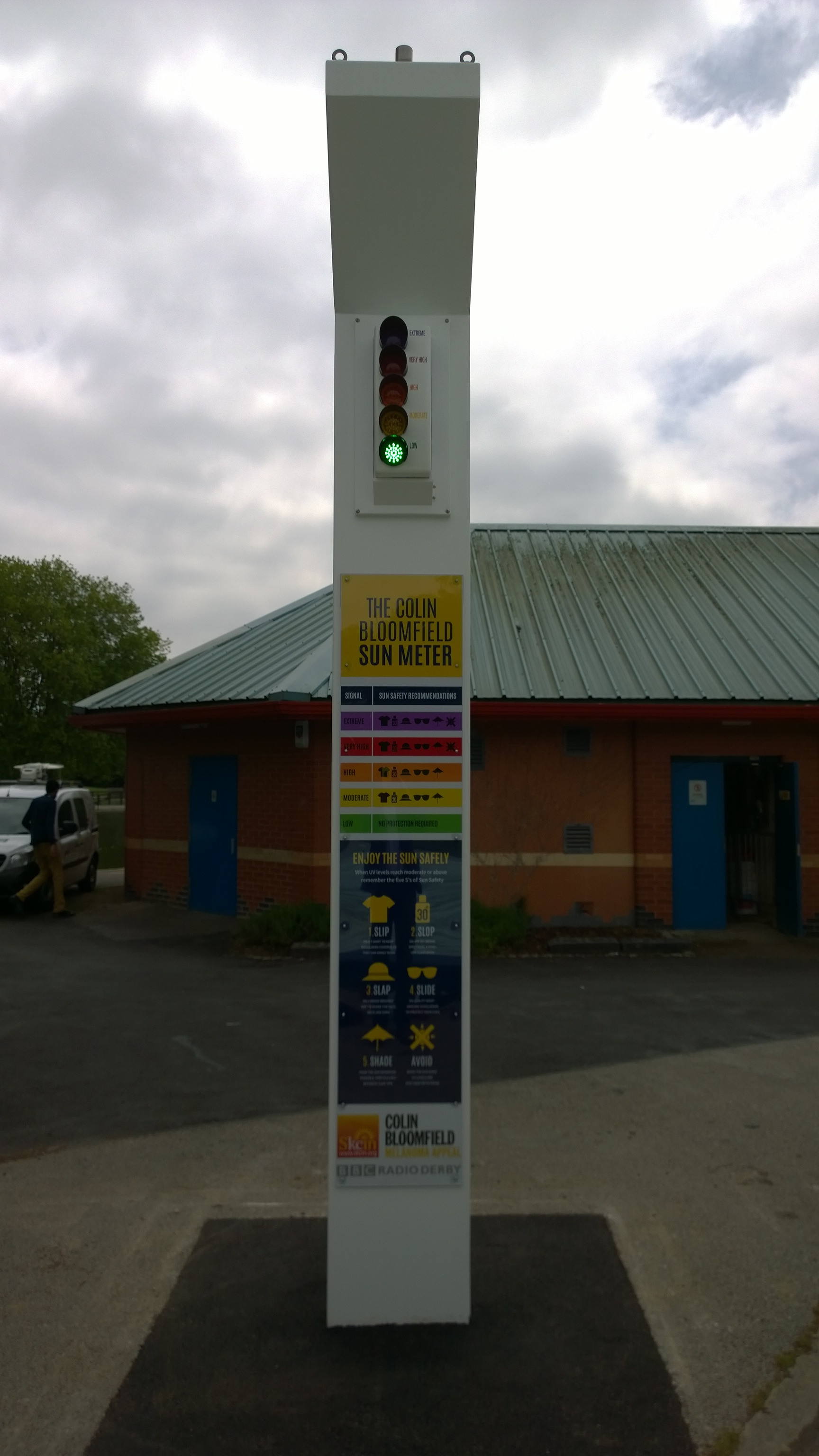
Colin Bloomfield Sun Meter

On 3 June 2016, Radio Derby unveiled the UK's first public UV meter in Markeaton Park. It was a joint venture with the charity Skcin and was paid for with proceeds from the Colin Bloomfield Melanoma Appeal. Later in the year, a second meter was unveiled in Long Eaton's West Park.

== Money Mountain appeals ==
From 1983 until 2008, BBC Radio Derby held its annual 'Money Mountain' event. In later years this took place on the second Sunday of October; however it was originally held over the course of the entire weekend, and was presented from a marquee in the station's car park. This idea was abandoned a few years prior to the event's demise and all presenting took place inside the station building itself.

The idea of the event was to support local charities with donations from listeners. The day commenced with 'Dial a Hymn'; where listeners dedicated hymns to loved ones in exchange for a donation. This was followed at 9 am by an on-air auction which lasted until late in the evening. Lots typically consisted services by local companies (such as car valeting) and unique items (such as signed celebrity photographs, behind-the-scenes tours and home-made products).

In 2004, the amount of money raised over the years passed the one million pound mark. The person who pledged the bid to surpass this figure was rewarded with a cut glass trophy.

The 2008 auction was to be the last. Twenty-five years had passed since the first auction, and it was decided for the event to "go out on a high" in the anniversary year. The final lot was to win the actual gavel used during the auction over the years. This raised £350; the final total for the 2008 auction was £20,951.31, bringing the grand total over the twenty-five years to £1,121,010.31.

== It Starts With You campaign ==
On 10 July 2026, the station launched a campaign to raise awareness of hereditary cancers. This coincided with the 20 year anniversary of one of its presenters, Becky Measures, undergoing a preventative double mastectomy at the age of 24. At the time she was reportedly the youngest woman in the UK to have the procedure.

The campaign involved medical experts and cancer survivors appearing on BBC Radio Derby; a 'roadshow' of free events across Derby, Derbyshire, and East Staffordshire featuring medial experts and community groups; and an 'It Starts With You' choir made up of ordinary people whose lives have been marked by cancer, featuring an original song written especially for the group.

It was also backed by health officials in the NHS.
