= Yeaton =

Village in Shropshire, England

Coordinates: 52.769°N 2.841°W

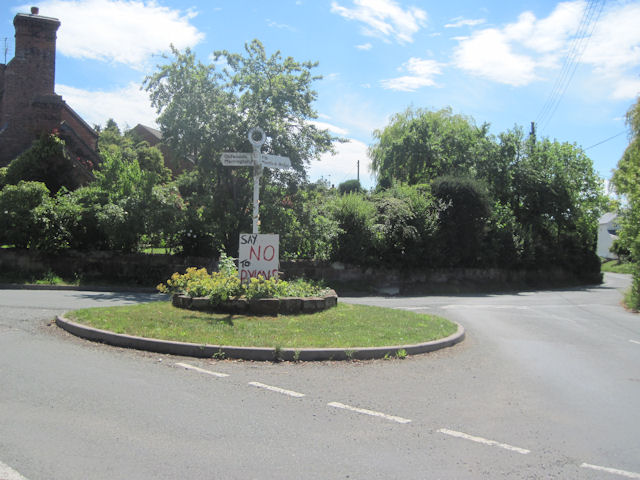
- Crossroads in centre of Yeaton

- Location within Shropshire
- OS grid reference: SJ432194
- Civil parish: Baschurch
- Unitary authority: Shropshire
- Ceremonial county: Shropshire
- Region: West Midlands
- Country: England
- Sovereign state: United Kingdom
- Post town: SHREWSBURY
- Postcode district: SY4
- Dialling code: 01939
- Police: West Mercia
- Fire: Shropshire
- Ambulance: West Midlands
- UK Parliament: North Shropshire

Yeaton is a small village in Shropshire, England.

It is situated in the parish of Baschurch. The River Perry flows by to the south, and on the other side is the hamlet of Grafton.

== See also ==
- Listed buildings in Baschurch
