= Henry Eckford (horticulturist) =

Henry Eckford (17 May 1823 – 5 December 1905) was a Scots horticulturist and reputedly the most famous breeder of sweet peas, transforming the plant from a minor horticultural subject into the queen of annuals. U.S. horticulturist Liberty Hyde Bailey called him "the prince of specialists". In 1888 he moved to the town of Wem in Shropshire, England. It was in Wem that he perfected the breeding of his Grandiflora sweet peas, which in size of bloom and general performance were a great improvement over previous varieties.

== Chronology ==
- 1823 - born in Stenhouse, near Edinburgh, Scotland.
- 1839 - apprenticed in the gardens of Beaufort Castle near Inverness (estate of Lord Lovat).
- After completing apprenticeship employed consecutively in gardens of New Liston near Edinburgh, Fingask Castle, Perthshire, Penicuik House, and Oxenfoord Castle.
- 1854 - became head gardener at Coleshill, Berkshire, England (gardens of Earl of Radnor).
- 1854-1870 - experimented with the breeding of dahlias, pelargoniums and verbenas.
- 1870 - in charge of the garden of Dr. Sankey at Sandywell, Gloucester. Here he was particularly encouraged in plant breeding work.
- 1879 - major work on sweet peas commenced.
- Moved with employer to Boreatton (which gave name to one of his sweet pea varieties), Baschurch, Shropshire.
- 1888 - moved to Wem, Shropshire, where he established Eckford's Nursery. In Wem, he became a member of Wem Parish Council and Wem Urban District Council.
- 1905 - Awarded Victoria Medal of Honour by the Royal Horticultural Society and was presented with an illuminated parchment address and silver tea and coffee service subscribed by more than 200 admirers worldwide.
- 25 December 1905 - died aged 82 at his house in Noble Street, Wem; buried in Whitchurch Road Cemetery, Wem.

Henry Eckford was a Fellow of the Royal Horticultural Society. From horticultural shows he gained "upwards of 85 gold and silver medals" among his prizes.

== Personal life ==
Eckford was twice married. His first wife, who predeceased him, was Charlotte, daughter of Job Stainer of Queen Camel, Somerset, by whom he had two sons and a daughter who survived him. His second wife was Emily, daughter of Godfrey Gerring, of Coleshill, Berkshire.

== Legacy ==
In 1907 it was written that because of Eckford's work, sweet peas "are now of such world-wide importance that many hundreds of acres are annually cultivated, and through their general popularity Wem has become famous throughout the world, and is looked upon as the Mecca of sweet peas."

In honour of Henry Eckford the town of Wem (specifically the Eckford Sweet Pea Society of Wem) has held each year in July (except in 2020 and 2021) a sweet pea show. In this there is a section for old fashioned varieties, always including many bred by Henry Eckford.

His family name is perpetuated in the name of Eckford Park, a residential road in Wem.
