= Shropshire County Cricket League =

Cricket league in England

The Shropshire County Cricket League is a league cricket competition based in the county of Shropshire, England.

It began in 2012, succeeding the Shropshire Premier Cricket League and the Shropshire Cricket League which were wound up at the end of the 2011 season.

The Shropshire County Cricket League has an unofficial podcast called Cow Corner Podcast, which releases once a month during the cricket season. It has two shows for the Shropshire Cricket League and talks about all divisions within its structure.

== Divisional structure (2023 Season) ==
The Shropshire County League has 12 Divisions (9 Saturday, 3 Sunday). A few of its clubs are situated on the Welsh/English border

=== Premier Division ===
- Ludlow
- Madeley
- Newport
- Quatt
- Oswestry
- Sentinel
- Shelton
- Shrewsbury 2nd XI
- St Georges
- Wellington
- Wem
- Whitchurch

=== Division 1 ===
- Allscott Heath
- Bomere Heath
- Bridgnorth 2nd XI
- Chirk
- Cound
- Frankton
- Lilleshall
- Newton
- Shifnal 2nd XI
- Wellington 2nd XI
- Worfield 2nd XI
- Wroxeter

=== Division 2 ===
- Alberbury
- Albrighton
- Beacon
- Chelmarsh
- Ellsmere
- Forton
- Knockin & Kinnerley
- Pontesbury
- Sentinel 2nd XI
- Shelton
- Trysull & Seisdon
- Wellington 3rd XI

=== Division 3 ===
- Broseley
- Column
- Church Aston
- Ludlow 2nd XI
- Madeley 2nd XI
- Montgomery
- Oswestry 2nd XI
- Quatt 2nd XI
- St Georges 2nd XI
- Welshpool
- Wem 2nd XI
- Willey

=== Division 4 ===
- Bishops Castle
- Bridgnorth 2nd XI
- Condover
- Frankton 2nd XI
- Guilsfield
- Harpers
- Hodnet & Peplow
- Newport 2nd XI
- Shifnal 3rd XI
- Shrewsbury 3rd XI
- Wheaton Aston
- Whitchurch 2nd XI

=== Division 5 ===
- Beacon 2nd XI
- Bomere Heath 2nd XI
- Cae Glas
- Calverhall
- Church Stretton
- Iscoyd & Fenns Bank
- Llanidloes
- Much Wenlock
- Newton 2nd XI
- Priorslee
- St Georges 3rd XI
- Wellington 4th XI

=== Division 6 ===
- Acton Reynald
- Allscott Heath 2nd XI
- Column 2nd XI
- Cound 2nd XI
- Harcourt
- Knockin & Kinnerley 2nd XI
- Lilleshall 2nd XI
- Ludlow 3rd XI
- Montgomery 2nd XI
- Welshpool 2nd XI
- Willey 2nd XI
- Wroxeter 2nd XI

=== Division 7 ===
- Alberbury 2nd XI
- Albrighton 2nd XI
- Condover 2nd XI
- Corvedale
- Coton Hall
- Ellesmere 2nd XI
- Forton 2nd XI
- Lilleshall 3rd XI
- Pontesbury 2nd XI
- Quatt 3rd XI

=== Division 8 ===
- Beacon 3rd XI
- Cae Glas 2nd XI
- Chirk 2nd XI
- Guilsfield 2nd XI
- Quayside
- Sentinel 3rd XI

=== Sunday Division 1 ===
- Alberbury 3rd XI
- Church Aston 2nd XI
- Madeley 3rd XI
- Newport 3rd XI
- Shelton 3rd XI
- Shrewsbury 4th XI
- Wem 3rd XI
- Worfield 3rd XI

=== Sunday Division 2 ===
- Harpers 2nd XI
- Knockin & Kinnerley 3rd XI
- Oswestry 3rd XI
- St Georges 4th XI
- Sentinel 4th XI
- Shifnal 4th XI
- Wellington 5th XI
- Whitchurch 3rd XI

=== Sunday Division 3 ===
- Bomere Heath 3rd XI
- Bridgnorth 4th XI
- Chelmarsh 2nd XI
- Cound 3rd XI
- Frankton 3rd XI
- Knockin & Kinnerley 4th XI
- Lilleshall 4th XI
- Madeley 4th XI
- Oswestry 4th XI
- Pontesbury 3rd XI
