= Leaton railway station =

Disused railway station in Shropshire, England

Leaton
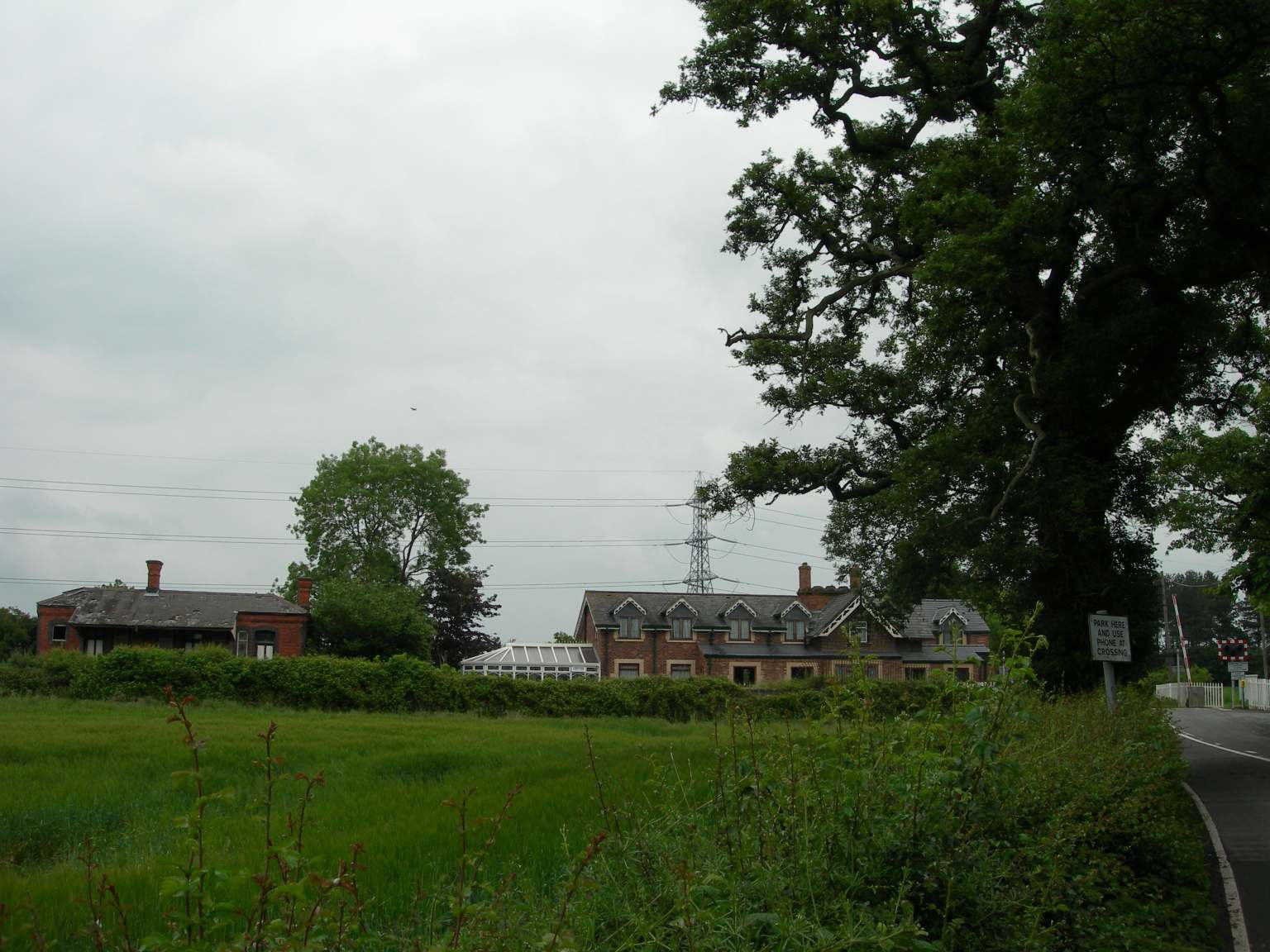

General information
- Location: Leaton, Shropshire; England
- Coordinates: 52.7638°N 2.7811°W
- Grid reference: SJ472187
- Platforms: 2

Other information
- Status: Disused

History
- Original company: Shrewsbury, Oswestry and Chester Junction Railway
- Pre-grouping: Great Western Railway
- Post-grouping: Great Western Railway

Key dates
- 12 October 1848: Station opens
- 12 September 1960: Closed to passengers
- 15 Mar 1965: Closed to goods
Location

Leaton railway station was a minor station located about six miles north of Shrewsbury on the GWR's Paddington to Birkenhead main line. Today this is part of the Shrewsbury to Chester line. It was at the top of the long climb up Hencote bank out of Shrewsbury. The station opened on 12 October 1848 and closed on 12 September 1960. The station building (now a private house) can still be seen on the north side of the adjacent Leaton level crossing on the east side of the line. A small industrial estate now exists at the former railway sidings.

== Historical services ==
Express trains did not call at Leaton, only local services. It closed to passenger traffic in 1960.

According to the Official Handbook of Stations the following classes of traffic were being handled at this station in 1956: G, P & L, and there was no crane.

== Neighbouring stations ==
Preceding station	Historical railways	Following station
Shrewsbury	Great Western Railway; Shrewsbury to Chester Line	Oldwoods Halt
