= Giat =

- Commune
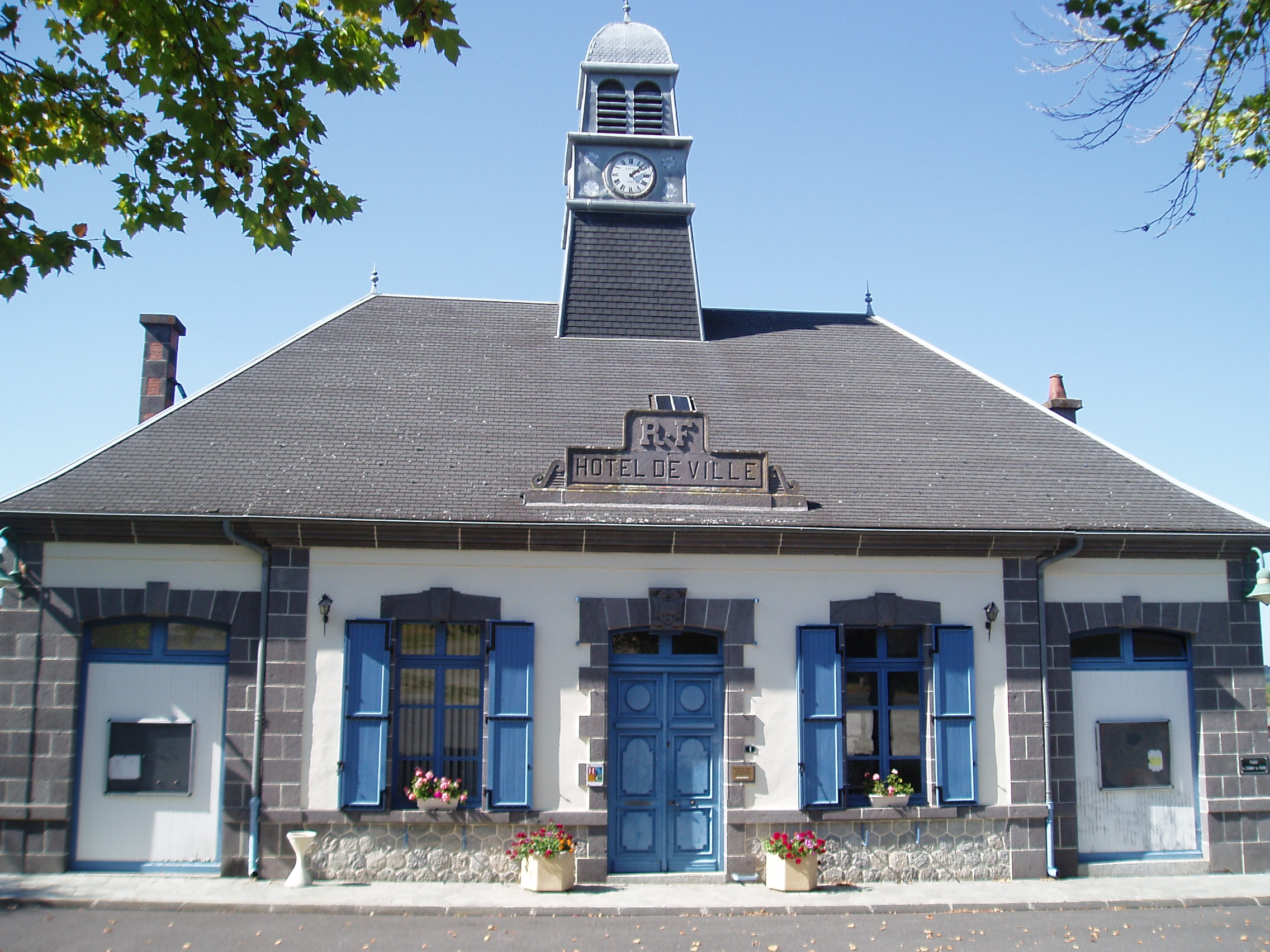
- The town hall in Giat

- Coat of arms
- Location of Giat
- Location within France Location within Auvergne-Rhône-Alpes
- Coordinates: 45°48′10″N 2°28′06″E
- Country: France
- Region: Auvergne-Rhône-Alpes
- Department: Puy-de-Dôme
- Arrondissement: Riom
- Canton: Saint-Ours
- Intercommunality: CC Chavanon Combrailles et Volcans

Government
  - Mayor (2026–32): Didier Senegas-Rouviere
- Area^{1}: 47.95 km^{2} (18.51 sq mi)
- Elevation: 761 m (2,497 ft)
- Highest elevation: 824 m (2,703 ft)
- Lowest elevation: 704 m (2,310 ft)
- Population (2023): 786
  - Density: 16.4/km^{2} (42.5/sq mi)
- Time zone: UTC+01:00 (CET)
  - Summer (DST): UTC+02:00 (CEST)
- INSEE/Postal code: 63165 /63620
- ^{1} French Land Register data, which excludes lakes, ponds, glaciers > 1 km^{2} (0.386 sq mi or 247 acres) and river estuaries.

Giat (French pronunciation: [ʒja]; Occitan: Giac) is a commune in the Puy-de-Dôme department in Auvergne in central France.

== Geography ==
The Chavanon (locally called la Ramade) flows southeastward through the south-western part of the commune.

== Twin town ==
Giat is twinned with the village of Baschurch in Shropshire, England.

== See also ==
- Communes of the Puy-de-Dôme department
