= Listed buildings in Bicton, Shrewsbury =

Bicton is a civil parish in Shropshire, England. It contains 36 listed buildings that are recorded in the National Heritage List for England. Of these, four are listed at Grade II*, the middle of the three grades, and the others are at Grade II, the lowest grade. The parish contains the village of Bicton and the surrounding countryside. Most of the listed buildings are houses and associated structures, farmhouses and farm buildings. The other listed buildings include a former church, now in ruins, and items in its churchyard, and its replacement, a bridge, and two milestones.

== Key ==
Grade	Criteria
II*	Particularly important buildings of more than special interest
II	Buildings of national importance and special interest

== Buildings ==
Name and location	Photograph	Date	Notes	Grade
The Old House or Home Farmhouse, The Isle; 52.74542°N 2.80254°W	—	Mid to late 15th century (probable)	The house was extended in the 17th century, and altered and extended in the 19th century. It is timber framed with brick nogging, refaced or rebuilt in red brick, the 19th-century extension is in red brick and the roof is tiled. The hall range has one storey and an attic and two bays, the cross-wing has two storeys and two bays, and the extension has two storeys. Some windows are casements, and others are sashes, and there are segmental-headed doorways.	II
Lower Woodcote Farmhouse; 52.69989°N 2.81305°W	—	Mid to late 16th century	A timber framed farmhouse that was extended in the 17th century. It has a T-shaped plan, the 17th-century part forming a hall, and the earlier part a cross-wing. The hall has two or three bays and two storeys with an attic, and the cross-wing has three or four bays and two storeys. The timber framing has plastered infill, it is partly on a brick base, and the roofs are tiled. The windows are cross-windows, mullioned and transomed, or casements, and there are two gabled eaves dormers. There is a 16th-century porch with bargeboards, and a doorway with a moulded surround, and a 19th-century doorway with a three-part Gothic fanlight and a gabled porch.	II*
Dinthill Cottages; 52.70986°N 2.85316°W	—	Late 16th or early 17th century	A house, later divided into two dwellings, it is timber framed with red brick nogging, partly refaced or rebuilt in red brick, and with a slate roof, hipped to the east. There is an L-shaped plan, and two storeys. On the front is a gabled porch and a segmental-headed doorway, and the windows are casements.	II
Upper Woodcote; 52.69935°N 2.81255°W	—	Early 17th century	A farmhouse, later a private house, it is timber framed with brick infill, partly rendered, on a brick plinth and with a slate roof. There are two storeys and an attic, and three bays, and the windows are casements. At the northeast is a gabled brick stair tower, and in the angle is a porch with a hipped roof.	II
Laundry Cottage and Rossall Cottage; 52.73219°N 2.79223°W	—	c. 1677	Originally a service range of Rossall Hall that was converted into two cottages in 1965 when the hall was demolished. They are in red brick with some stone dressings, a dentil eaves cornice, and a tile roof with parapeted and coped gables. There are two storeys and five bays, the central three bays projecting under a pediment. In the centre is a 20th-century door with a Gibbs surround, and most of the windows are cross-windows.	II
Bicton Farmhouse; 52.73205°N 2.82289°W	—	c. 1700	The farmhouse is in rendered brick on a plinth, with a band, quoins, and a hipped tile roof. There are two storeys, attics and a basement, and a front of three bays. Steps lead up to a doorway with a rectangular fanlight, and the windows are sashes.	II
Bicton Grove Farmhouse; 52.73003°N 2.81410°W	—	c. 1700	The farmhouse was altered and extended in the early 19th century. It is in red brick on a chamfered plinth, with a moulded eaves cornice, and a hipped slate roof. There are two storeys and attics, and a front of two bays. On the front is a doorway with an architrave, and a lean-to conservatory. The windows are sashes, and in the attics are dormers. Internally the house has retained rich fittings dating from about 1700.	II*
Preston Montford Hall; 52.72355°N 2.84075°W		c. 1700	A small country house, later used for other purposes, it was altered in the 19th century. The house is in brick on a plinth on a moulded top, with sandstone dressings, chamfered quoins, a band, a moulded modillioned eaves cornice, and a hipped slate roof. The main block has two storeys, an attic and a basement, and a front of three bays. The doorway has pilasters an entablature and a triangular pediment. The windows are sashes, and in the attic are three dormers. Elsewhere there is a Greek Doric porch with unfluted columns, a frieze and a cornice, and a wooden bellcote with a pyramidal cap and a weathervane.	II*
Dovecote, The Isle; 52.74507°N 2.80271°W	—	Late 17th or early 18th century	A summer house, later a dovecote, it is in red brick with some grey sandstone dressings, and has a pyramidal tile roof. There is a square plan, and a plinth with a moulded top, chamfered quoins, a dentil eaves cornice, and a lead top with a weathervane. There is a door with a fanlight, a window, and a square opening for doves.	II
Stable, Bicton Grove Farm; 52.73002°N 2.81381°W	—	Early 18th century	The stable is in red brick with a tile roof, and has one storey and a loft. There is a pair of segmental-headed doorways, and a two-light loft window in the right gable end.	II
Remains of Holy Trinity Church; 52.73093°N 2.82258°W	—	Early 18th century	The church is in ruins and is roofless. It is built in red brick with grey sandstone dressings. Walls surround a former nave and chancel, and a doorway and window surrounds have survived. Inside the church are two squires' pews, one with doors, and the other with a fireplace.	II
The Isle; 52.74570°N 2.80199°W	—	Early 18th century	A small country house that was extended later in the century, and additions made later at each end. It is in pink and purple brick with dressings in grey sandstone and hipped slate roofs. There are three storeys and a long rectangular plan, with seven bays on the east front and eight on the west front. At the north end is a later bay, and at the south end a conservatory with Tuscan columns. On the west front is a Doric porch with cable-fluted columns, an entablature, a moulded cornice and a triangular pediment. The doorway has a moulded architrave and a rectangular fanlight. The windows are sashes.	II
Dinthill Hall; 52.70913°N 2.84760°W	—	1734	A small country house that was extended in the 18th century. It is in red brick with sandstone dressings and a slate roof. The original part has two storeys, an attic and a basement, there is a one-storey service wing at the rear, and a later infilling block. The north front has a plinth with a moulded top, chamfered quoins, a moulded cornice, and a coped parapet. There are six bays, and a central doorway with a moulded architrave, a pulvinated frieze, panelled pilasters, a cornice, and a segmental pediment on scrolled brackets. The windows are sashes with keystone, and above are three dormers.	II*
Barn and stables, Dinthill Hall; 52.70896°N 2.84841°W	—	c. 1734	The building is in red brick and has a tiled roof with parapeted gables. There is one storey and a loft. It contains casement windows and doorways, some blocked, and one with a hood. In the gable ends are loft doors and owl holes in the apices.	II
Dovecote, Dinthill Hall; 52.70878°N 2.84806°W	—	c. 1734	The dovecote is in red brick with a dentil eaves cornice, and a pyramidal slate roof. There are two storeys and an octagonal plan. It has a round-arched arcade with moulded architraves, imposts and keystones, a moulded cornice, and an ogee lead cap with a weathervane. The dovecote contains a doorway and two loft openings, all with segmental heads.	II
Rossall Farmhouse; 52.73303°N 2.79189°W	—	Early to mid 18th century	The farmhouse was extended to the rear in the 19th century. It is in red brick, clad in concrete tiles at the rear, and has a tile roof with parapeted gables. There is a T-shaped plan, the main block having two storeys and an attic and three bays, and the rear wing with two storeys. On the front is a central porch flanked by canted bay windows, in the upper floor are mullioned and transomed casement windows, and in the attic are three gabled dormers.	II
Privy, The Isle; 52.74570°N 2.80141°W	—	Mid 18th century	The privy is in red brick with a dentil eaves cornice and a pyramidal tile roof with a weathervane. It has a square plan and one storey. There are two segmental-headed doorways and a sash window.	II
Stable and coach house, The Isle; 52.74548°N 2.80304°W	—	Mid 18th century	The building is in red brick with a band, and a tile roof with parapeted gable ends. It has one storey and a loft, and contains various doorways and windows, some of them boarded.	II
Grotto; 52.73302°N 2.82326°W		Late 18th century (probable)	The grotto has a front of breccia and red sandstone and is covered in earth at the rear. It has a round-arched entrance with voussoirs, and imposts decorated with shells. This is flanked by lancet openings, and there is a parapeted gable with a round-arched opening in the apex. Inside is a semicircular dome with some shell decoration, and a continuous bench.	II
Montford Bridge; 52.73246°N 2.84274°W		1790–92	The bridge carries the B4380 road (Holyhead Road) over the River Severn, and was designed by Thomas Telford. It is in red sandstone, and consists of three elliptical arches with chamfered voussoirs, keystones, pilaster strips, and semicircular cutwaters. The footpaths have balustrades, and the wing walls curve out to end piers.	II
Bicton House; 52.72494°N 2.82493°W	—	c. 1800	The house is in red brick on a stone plinth. and has a parapet with moulded coping. There are three storeys and sides of three bays, with gables treated as triangular pediments on the sides. The doorway has fluted Ionic three-quarter columns with fluted capitals, a radial fanlight, an entablature with a triglyph frieze, and an open triangular pediment. The windows are sashes, the central windows in the two upper floors having architraves. In the left return is a full-height canted bay window.	II
Corner Farmhouse; 52.71042°N 2.81368°W	—	Late 18th or early 19th century	The farmhouse is in red brick with a dentil eaves cornice and a tiled roof with pedimented gables. It has two storeys with attics, a front of three bays, and a rear two-storey wing. Steps with wrought iron handrails lead up to a doorway with a rectangular fanlight and a flat hood on shaped brackets. The windows are mullioned and transomed with casements, and there are three gabled dormers. At the rear is a corner stair tower.	II
Hortonlane Farmhouse; 52.69839°N 2.83093°W	—	Late 18th or early 19th century	A red brick farmhouse with a slate roof, two storeys with attics, and three bays. The central doorway has a rectangular fanlight and a flat bracketed hood. The windows are sashes, and in the attic are three gabled dormers with horizontally-sliding sashes.	II
Woodlands Farmhouse; 52.73284°N 2.82268°W	—	Late 18th or early 19th century	The farmhouse is in red brick with a dentil eaves cornice and a hipped slate roof. The main block has three storeys, the rear wing has two, and there are three bays. In the centre of the north front is a Greek Doric porch with two columns, an entablature, a blocking course, and a cast iron lattice balustrade. The doorway has unfluted Ionic pilasters that have capitals with egg and dart decoration, a frieze, a cornice, and a segmental fanlight. The windows are sashes, and there are blind windows painted to imitate sashes. At the rear is a large round-arched blind recess, and mullioned and transomed casement windows.	II
Granary, Woodlands Farm; 52.73320°N 2.82330°W	—	Late 18th or early 19th century	The granary is in red brick with some sandstone dressings and a slate roof. It has two storeys, the upper storey being treated as an eye catcher from the farmhouse. It has sides of three and two bays, blind round-arched arcading with impost blocks, a pedimented gable with a blind semicircular recess in the tympanum. It also has a loft door and a pigeon loft.	II
Shrewsbury Lodge; 52.71610°N 2.82817°W	—	c. 1815–20	The entrance lodge to Onslow Hall, now demolished, it is in rendered brick with grey sandstone dressings, a continuous frieze, and a slate roof. It is in Greek Revival style, with one storey, and has a cruciform plan. The front has five bays, and a central three-bay Doric portico with an entablature and a triangular pediment. The outer bays have triangular pedimented gables.	II
Stable block, wall and dovecote, Onslow Hall; 52.71127°N 2.83558°W	—	c. 1815–20	The stable block is in red brick, partly rendered, with grey sandstone dressings and hipped slate roofs. There are three single-storey ranges forming three sides of a courtyard that is enclosed by a wall at the northeast. The block includes a segmental-headed carriage archway with a triangular pediment, an archway with an elliptical head, and other openings. A garden wall runs from the southeast. This is in rendered brick with sandstone dressings, panelled pilasters, a frieze and a cornice, moulded coping, and globe finials. At the end is a dovecote in red brick with a hipped slate roof, two storeys, gables with bargeboards and finials, and a weathervane.	II
Spearman memorial and enclosure 52.73105°N 2.82265°W	—	1824	The memorial is in the churchyard of the former Holy Trinity Church, and is to the memory of two members of the Spearman family. It is a chest tomb in the form of a sarcophagus. The tomb has a moulded plinth, fluted corner piers, a moulded cornice, and a concave top with a gadrooned and fluted pyramidal cap with a globe finial. The tomb is surrounded by a wrought iron enclosure with spearhead railings and square-section standards with urn finials.	II
Chest tomb and enclosure 52.73105°N 2.82260°W	—	Early 19th century	The chest tomb is in the churchyard of the former Holy Trinity Church. It is in grey sandstone, and has flanking fluted pilaster strips, recessed round-arched side panels, raised oval end panels, and a moulded cornice to a low pyramidal top. The inscription is illegible. The tomb is surrounded by a wrought iron enclosure with spearhead railings and square-section standards with urn finials.	II
Chest tomb and enclosure 52.73118°N 2.82251°W	—	Early 19th century	The chest tomb is in the churchyard of the former Holy Trinity Church. It is in grey sandstone, and has flanking fluted pilaster strips, raised and fielded side and end panels, and moulded cornice to a chamfered top. The inscription is illegible. The tomb is surrounded by a large wrought iron enclosure with spearhead railings and square-section standards with urn finials.	II
Milestone near The Four Crosses Public House; 52.72277°N 2.80654°W		Early 19th century	The milestone was erected under the supervision of Thomas Telford. It is in polished granite and has a shallow pointed top and chamfered corners. It contains a cast iron plate with lettering indicating the distances in miles to Holyhead and "SALOP" (Shrewsbury)".	II
Milestone near Bicton House; 52.72737°N 2.82814°W		Early 19th century	The milestone was erected under the supervision of Thomas Telford. It is in polished granite and has a shallow pointed top and chamfered corners. It contains a cast iron plate with lettering indicating the distances in miles to Holyhead and "SALOP" (Shrewsbury)".	II
The Red House; 52.73236°N 2.82227°W	—	Early 19th century	The house is in red brick on a plinth, with an eaves band and a slate roof. It has an L-shaped plan with a main block of two storeys and three bays, and a rear wing with two storeys and an attic. In the angle at the rear is a porch with a hipped roof and a round-arched opening. The doorway has panelled pilasters, a frieze, a rectangular fanlight and a cornice on reeded consoles, and the windows are sashes.	II
White House; 52.73181°N 2.82198°W	—	Early 19th century	Originally a stable block, coach house and cottage, later combined into one house, it is in brick with a slate roof. There is one storey with an attic and a front of four unequal bays. In the third bay is a large gabled full-dormer that contains a cast iron casement window with Gothic tracery. There are similar windows in the first two bays. The other windows are wooden casements, and there is a segmental-headed doorway. At the rear are the former stable and coach house that have various openings.	II
Holy Trinity Church; 52.72870°N 2.81881°W		1885–87	The church is built in Alberbury and Redhill breccia with dressings in sandstone and a tile roof, and is in Decorated style. It consists of a nave, a south aisle, a south porch, a chancel, a north vestry and a southeast tower. The tower has three stages, diagonal buttresses, string courses, a clock face, and an embattled parapet with moulded coping. There is a stair turret, square at the base and with an octagonal top stage and an embattled parapet.	II
Oxon Hall; 52.72104°N 2.80399°W	—	Undated	A small country house, later used for other purposes, it is in rendered brick on a plinth, with a sill band, a frieze, a moulded cornice, and a slate roof. There are three storeys with an attic and basement at the front, and two storeys at the rear. On the front are seven bays, a central three-bay porch with pilasters and an entablature, and a door with a rectangular fanlight. This is flanked by full-height canted bay windows with semi-conical roofs. The windows are sashes.	II
