= Bicton, Shrewsbury =

Village in Shropshire, England

Coordinates: 52.727°N 2.817°W

Bicton
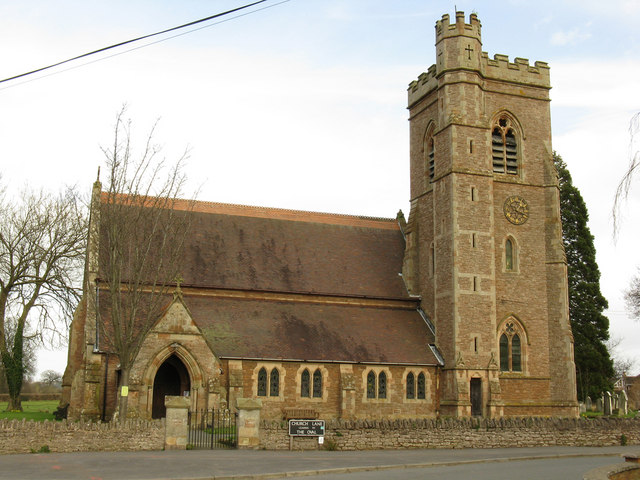
- Holy Trinity Church, Bicton

- Location within Shropshire
- Population: 1,092 (2011)
- OS grid reference: SJ448147
- Civil parish: Bicton
- Unitary authority: Shropshire
- Ceremonial county: Shropshire
- Region: West Midlands
- Country: England
- Sovereign state: United Kingdom
- Post town: SHREWSBURY
- Postcode district: SY3
- Dialling code: 01743
- Police: West Mercia
- Fire: Shropshire
- Ambulance: West Midlands
- UK Parliament: Shrewsbury and Atcham

Bicton is a village and civil parish in Shropshire, England. According to the 2001 census it had a population of 890, increasing to 1,092 at the 2011 Census.

The village is about three miles north-west of Shrewsbury town centre and includes part of Montford Bridge.

The parish includes the small primary Bicton school, as well as Preston Montford with the Field Centre there.

== Notable people ==
- Sir Richard Jenkins (1785–1853), Chairman of East India Company, MP for Shrewsbury, grew up at Bicton Hall, and was buried at Bicton.
- Sam Aiston (born 1976), former professional footballer with Shrewsbury Town, began his teaching career at Bicton Primary School after retiring from play in 2010.
- Colin Bloomfield (1982–2015), radio personality, went to primary school in Bicton.

== See also ==
- Listed buildings in Bicton, Shrewsbury
