= James Gale (cricketer) =

Guernsey cricketer (born 1986)

Personal information
- Born: 14 September 1986 (age 40); Shrewsbury, England

International information
- National side: Guernsey
- Source: Cricinfo, 19 July 2015

James Gale (born 14 September 1986) is a cricketer who plays for Guernsey and Shropshire. He played in the 2014 ICC World Cricket League Division Five tournament.
