= Mike Carey (broadcaster) =

English broadcaster (1936–2023)

- Born: Michael John Carey; 25 January 1936; Derby, England
- Died: 20 May 2023 (aged 87); Derby, England
- Career
- Station: BBC Radio Derby
- Style: Presenter, author and cricket correspondent

Michael John Carey (25 January 1936 – 20 May 2023) was an English broadcaster, author and cricket correspondent, best known for his work on BBC Radio Derby.

== Career ==
Carey started his career at the Derby Telegraph before becoming the newspaper's chief cricket correspondent. He was also cricket correspondent for The Daily Telegraph from 1982 to 1986. He was best known for presenting various programmes for BBC Radio Derby, including Memorable Melodies for over 20 years until 2019. He was always credited as Mike Carey. Alongside his radio work, Carey was an author and a national cricket correspondent.

== Personal life ==
Carey was born in Derby in 1936, and was educated at The Bemrose School.

=== Death ===
On 20 May 2023, he fell into the River Derwent, near his home in Darley Abbey. He was recovered from the river and taken to a nearby hospital, where he died later that day, aged 87. Aftab Gulzar, executive editor at BBC Radio Derby, said Carey had an "incredible life", praising his work ethic and described him as a "constant professional" when preparing his show.
