= Baschurch railway station =

Disused railway station in Shropshire, England

Baschurch
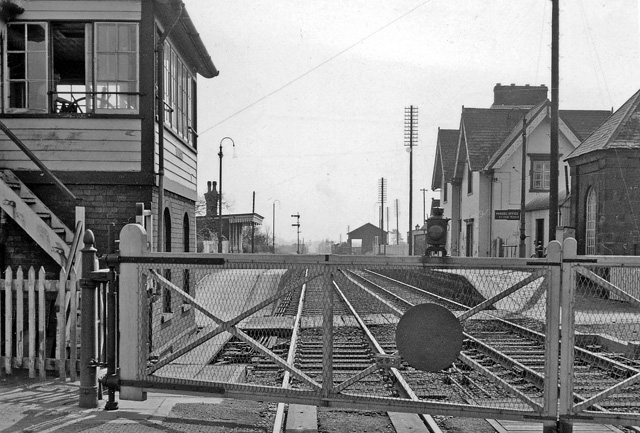
- Bascurch station in 1962

General information
- Location: Baschurch, Shropshire; England
- Coordinates: 52.7985°N 2.8474°W
- Grid reference: SJ428226
- Platforms: 2

Other information
- Status: Disused

History
- Original company: Shrewsbury, Oswestry and Chester Junction Railway
- Pre-grouping: Great Western Railway
- Post-grouping: Great Western Railway

Key dates
- 12 October 1848: Station opens
- 12 September 1960: Closed to passengers
- 5 July 1965: Closed to goods
Location

Baschurch railway station was a minor station located approximately seven miles northwest of Shrewsbury on the GWR's Paddington to Birkenhead main line. Today this is part of the Shrewsbury to Chester line. The station building (now a private house) can be seen on the west side of the line adjacent Baschurch level crossing; it was designed by Thomas Mainwaring Penson.

== Historical services ==
Express trains did not call at Baschurch, only local services.

According to the Official Handbook of Stations the following classes of traffic were being handled at this station in 1956: G, P, F, L, H & C and there was a three-ton crane.

Although the station was closed the line has continued in use for through trains.

== Accidents and incidents ==
- On 13 February 1961, an express passenger train, hauled by GWR 4900 Class 4-6-0 No. 6949 Haberfield Hall, was in collision with a freight train that was being shunted at the station. The accident was due to a signalman's error. Three people were killed and two were injured.

== Campaign for reopening ==
In September 2009, a local group was formed to campaign for the station to be reopened. An initial public meeting was attended by 250 people, and Arriva Trains Wales the franchise operator for the line agreed to re-examine the feasibility of trains stopping at Baschurch.

As of October 2011 the campaign continued, with the commissioning of new research into the feasibility of the reopening proposal. Funding for the study was declined by Shropshire Council, but campaigners aimed to fund it themselves.

In 2023 the local MP, Helen Morgan told parliament there was still support locally for reopening and urged Minister of State for Transport, Huw Merriman, to take this up. In December 2023 Baschurch Parish Council commissioned a preliminary study of the feasibility and business case for re-opening by a professional consultancy, due to report in Spring 2024. If favourable, this will form the basis for formal application to Shropshire (Unitary) Council and the Department for Transport for funding to proceed to detailed re-opening plans.

Preceding station	Historical railways	Following station
Oldwoods Halt	Great Western Railway; Shrewsbury to Chester Line	Stanwardine Halt

== See also ==
- Listed buildings in Baschurch
