= Shropshire Premier Cricket League =

The Shropshire Premier Cricket League (1970–2011) was the highest level club cricket competition in Shropshire. It was one step above the Shropshire Cricket League, and acted as a feeder league to the Birmingham and District Premier League, which is at the top of the English club cricket pyramid.

The league was sponsored by the brewery company Marstons and was made up of 12 clubs, whose 1st and 2nd XIs played each other twice, home and away, over the course of a league season. The 1st XI winners of the league (along with their 2nd XI) were usually promoted to the Birmingham and District Premier League.

The league was wound up on 28 November 2011.

It was succeeded by the Shropshire County Cricket League.
