= Merrington, Shropshire =

Village in Shropshire, England

Coordinates: 52.782°N 2.784°W

Merrington
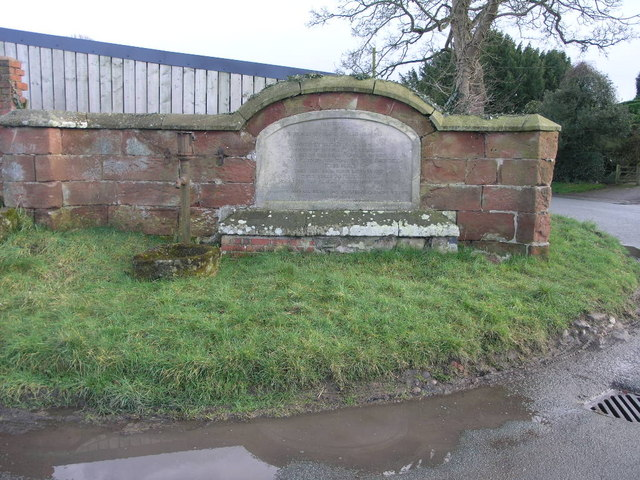
- The village well and pump, completed in 1864, in Merrington

- Location within Shropshire
- OS grid reference: SJ471208
- Civil parish: Bomere Heath and District
- Unitary authority: Shropshire
- Ceremonial county: Shropshire
- Region: West Midlands
- Country: England
- Sovereign state: United Kingdom
- Post town: SHREWSBURY
- Postcode district: SY4
- Dialling code: 01939
- Police: West Mercia
- Fire: Shropshire
- Ambulance: West Midlands
- UK Parliament: Shrewsbury

Merrington is a village in the civil parish of Bomere Heath and District, in Shropshire, England. It is situated to the north of the larger village of Bomere Heath. Nearby, to the west, is the hamlet of Old Woods.

== History and attractions ==
The village can be dated back nearly a millennium, with a record of a manor held here by Hunning in 1066. It was recorded as "Gellidone" in the Domesday Book, by which time (1086) it was held by a Norman noble.

The famous gardener, horticulturist and broadcaster, Percy Thrower, built his own house in the village, called "The Magnolias", in 1963 on land he acquired with a friend. This gave him a garden of about one and a half acres to "play with", something which he had never had before. The garden subsequently became the location for some of the episodes of Gardeners' World. He opened the garden to the public in 1966, and this became an annual event to raise money for charity. Long after his death the house was demolished after falling into structural problems in 2014.

The village also has a notable Victorian pump and deep well, paid for by Robert Aglionby Slaney and his wife, members of a local wealthy family.

Just to the west of the settlement is Merrington Green. An area of heathland/woodland here is common land, owned by Shropshire Council and managed by the Shropshire Wildlife Trust. Fishing ponds have also recently been established at the nearby Hayes Farm. The Green was a US Army camp during World War II and German prisoners of war were kept here for a time.

The centre of Merrington is situated at 104m above sea level; at Merrington Green there is a small hill which summits at 122m. The area is quite well wooded, with Merrington Green, the woods towards Old Woods, and the woodland to the east at Pim Hill.

== Public transport ==
A frequent Monday-Saturday bus service (presently the 576) connects Merrington with Oswestry, Baschurch, Bomere Heath and Shrewsbury.

== See also ==
- Listed buildings in Bomere Heath and District
