= The Corbet School =

Location
- Eyton Lane; Baschurch; Shropshire, SY4 2AX; England
- Coordinates: 52.7938°N 2.8508°W

Information
- Former name: Baschurch County Modern school
- Type: Academy
- Motto: "Inspire, Achieve, Succeed"
- Local authority: Shropshire Council
- Department for Education URN: 137336 Tables
- Ofsted: Reports
- Chair of Governors: Helen Scarisbrick
- Headteacher: Jane Tinker
- Gender: Mixed
- Age: 11 (Year 7) to 16 (Year 11)
- Enrolment: 700+ as of November 2021
- Language: English
- Houses: Cedar, Oak, Redwood, Beech, Elm, Teak
- Website: http://www.corbetschool.net/

The Corbet School is a mixed secondary school located in Baschurch in the English county of Shropshire.

Originally known as Baschurch Secondary Modern School, later the school became comprehensive and went on to gain specialist status as a Technology College. In September 2011 The Corbet School converted to academy status.

The Corbet School offers GCSEs and Cambridge Nationals as programmes of study for pupils.

== Lessons ==
All Year 7 pupils will be allocated a language to study (French or Spanish). They will study the chosen language for the rest of school resulting in a GCSE qualification at the end of Year 11.

Years 7-9 curriculum includes:

- English
- Maths
- Science (Physics, Biology, Chemistry)
- French or Spanish
- History
- Geography
- PSHE
- Physical Education
- Religious Education
- Design Technology (Product Design, Textiles, Food)
- Art and Design
- Music
- Drama
- ICT

At the end of Year 9 all students must take:

- Maths
- English (Language and Literature)
- Combined Science
- French or Spanish

Plus choose three options for GCSEs in Spring Term of Year 9 from:

- Physical Education
- Design and Technology
- Engineering
- Art and Design
- Religious Studies
- Triple Science
- Geography
- History
- Music
- Drama
- Computer Science
- Creative iMedia
- Health and Social Care
- Hospitality and Catering

KS4 students also continue PSHE and PE (non-GCSE).

== Attendance statistics ==
Academic Year 2018-19

- Attendance: 95.05%
- Unauthorised absence: 0.4%
- Authorised absence: 4.1%

== Notable former pupils ==
- Colin Bloomfield, broadcaster
- Suzanne Evans, politician
- Scott Quigley, footballer
- Calum Ferrie, footballer
- Chris Chittell, actor
