= Shropshire Cricket League =

Cricket league in Shropshire, England

The Shropshire Cricket League was a cricket league for clubs in Shropshire, United Kingdom. Founded in the 1960s, the league was succeeded by the Shropshire County Cricket League 2012.

== Format ==
The 1st XI winners of Division 1 of the league were promoted (along with their 2nd XI) to the Shropshire Premier Cricket League.

In its last season, 2011, the SCL comprised its usual seven divisions, involved 53 clubs, and again encompassed 90 teams. Promotion and relegation linked all sections and at least two sides went up through Divisions 2–7. Singleton and reserve sides moved independently through the divisions and were not tied to the fortunes of any senior XIs, although they were not eligible for first division membership.

Division One annually fed its champions (and its 2nd XI) into the Shropshire Premier League and so contained only clubs that possessed reserve side(s) and full facilities. The relegation of the SPL bottom club (and its 2nd XI) applied if the SPL deem it appropriate to their needs.

All divisions contained 12 sides except for Division Seven, which usually contained more (18 again this year) to cater for suitable new applicants. All seventh section sides played a full round of fixtures (22), with return games applying for cases of geographical proximity. It was league policy to introduce newly created or newly reformed teams in this bottom section, while existing clubs/teams accepted for membership were placed in a higher division.

== Dissolution ==
On 23 May 2011, following a second abortive attempt within two years to attract new clubs and form a second division, the SPL clubs voted overwhelmingly to amalgamate the leagues from the start of the 2012 season.

== Winners ==
Previous league winners that have been promoted to the Shropshire Premier League division 1 are noted below:

- 2010 – Worfield
- 2009 – Trysull & Seisdon
- 2008 – Allscott
- 2007 – Much Wenlock
- 2006 – Bomere Heath
- 2005 – Welshpool
- 2004 – Shelton
- 2003 – Quatt
- 2002 – Newtown
- 2001 – Market Drayton
