= Oldwoods Halt railway station =

Disused railway station in Shropshire, England

Oldwoods Halt & Siding

General information
- Location: Old Woods, Shropshire; England
- Coordinates: 52.7776°N 2.8094°W
- Grid reference: SJ454203
- Platforms: 2

Other information
- Status: Disused

History
- Original company: Great Western Railway

Key dates
- 3 July 1933: Station opens
- 12 September 1960: Closed to passengers
- 6 April 1964: Closed to goods
Location

Oldwoods Halt was a minor station located north of Shrewsbury on the GWR's Paddington to Birkenhead Woodside main line. It was opened in the nineteen thirties as part of the GWR's halt construction programme, aimed at combatting growing competition from bus services. Today the route is part of the Shrewsbury to Chester line. Nothing now remains of the halt although the area of the adjacent goods siding/s can still be seen on the west side of the line.

== Historical Services ==
Express trains did not call at Oldwoods Halt, only local services.

According to the Official Handbook of Stations the following classes of traffic were being handled at this station in 1956: G*, and there was a 15 cwt crane.

== Neighbouring stations ==
Preceding station	Historical railways	Following station
Leaton	Great Western Railway; Shrewsbury to Chester Line	Baschurch
