= Preston Montford =

Building in Shropshire, England

Coordinates: 52.7236°N 2.8408°W

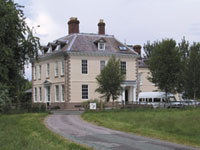
Preston Montford Field Centre

Preston Montford, or Preston Montford Hall, is a historic house 5 miles (8 km) west of Shrewsbury in England that is used as a field studies centre by Field Studies Council. The large eighteenth-century house with later additions is set in 12 hectares (30 acres) of grassland and woodland on the banks of the River Severn. It lies within easy reach of the meres and mosses landscape of north Shropshire, as well as the varied landscapes of the Shropshire Hills Area of Outstanding Natural Beauty. It is a grade II* listed building, indicating a particularly important building of more than special interest.

Opened as a field studies centre in 1957, Preston Montford is visited by students of biology and geography, and by school groups. Specialist interest groups regularly visit the centre. The Open University ran its 1-week undergraduate residential course SXR216 Environmental science in the field at the centre from 2003-2011. It has developed partnerships with Manchester Metropolitan University and the Botanical Society of Britain and Ireland to tackle the decline in skills of field taxonomy through the MSc in 'Biological Recording and Ecological Surveying'.

The locality is within Bicton civil parish. Preston Montford Farm is located just south of the Field Centre.

Walter Clopton Wingfield (1833-1912), later known as the pioneer of lawn tennis, grew up at Preston Montford while his father Clopton Lewis Wingfield (died 1846) lived there.

== Climate ==
Climate data for Preston Montford (1991–2020 averages)
Month	Jan	Feb	Mar	Apr	May	Jun	Jul	Aug	Sep	Oct	Nov	Dec	Year
Mean daily maximum °C (°F)	7.8 (46.0)	8.5 (47.3)	10.8 (51.4)	13.8 (56.8)	17.0 (62.6)	19.8 (67.6)	21.9 (71.4)	21.4 (70.5)	18.8 (65.8)	14.7 (58.5)	10.7 (51.3)	8.1 (46.6)	14.5 (58.1)
Mean daily minimum °C (°F)	1.5 (34.7)	1.5 (34.7)	2.5 (36.5)	4.0 (39.2)	6.6 (43.9)	9.4 (48.9)	11.3 (52.3)	11.2 (52.2)	9.1 (48.4)	6.6 (43.9)	3.9 (39.0)	1.9 (35.4)	5.8 (42.4)
Average precipitation mm (inches)	57.5 (2.26)	44.8 (1.76)	44.6 (1.76)	45.4 (1.79)	55.0 (2.17)	59.6 (2.35)	59.2 (2.33)	59.1 (2.33)	58.0 (2.28)	69.6 (2.74)	63.0 (2.48)	69.3 (2.73)	685.0 (26.97)
Average precipitation days	12.0	10.1	9.9	9.3	10.4	9.5	9.6	10.2	9.8	11.2	12.7	13.1	127.9
Mean monthly sunshine hours	46.2	71.9	107.4	151.1	182.1	169.7	181.7	161.1	124.6	93.1	54.2	39.2	1,382.2
Source: Met Office

== See also ==
- Listed buildings in Bicton, Shrewsbury
