= Bomere Heath =

Village in Shropshire, England

Coordinates: 52.772°N 2.780°W

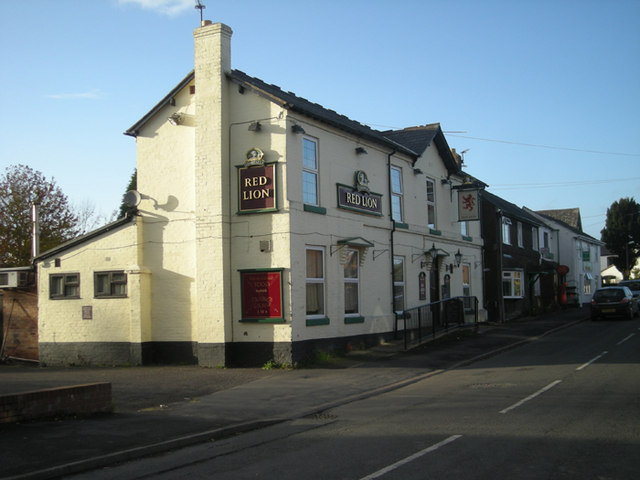
- The Red Lion public house, Bomere Heath

- Location within Shropshire
- OS grid reference: SP473197
- Civil parish: Bomere Heath and District
- Unitary authority: Shropshire
- Ceremonial county: Shropshire
- Region: West Midlands
- Country: England
- Sovereign state: United Kingdom
- Post town: Shrewsbury
- Postcode district: SY4
- Dialling code: 01939
- Police: West Mercia
- Fire: Shropshire
- Ambulance: West Midlands
- UK Parliament: Shrewsbury

Bomere Heath (/boʊmə/ BOW-mə, also /boʊmɪər/ BOW-mere) is a village in the civil parish of Bomere Heath and District, in Shropshire, England, which lies north of the county town of Shrewsbury and between Baschurch and Harlescott. It is situated between the A528 road and Berwick Road. The village has a primary school.

It is the main village of the parish of "Bomere Heath and District". Nearby, to the north, is the small village of Merrington.

The village has a few shops including a Co-op food store, a barber's shop, pub and a fish and chip restaurant.

== Education ==
The village now has Bomere Heath C of E primary school. Around 140 pupils attend. The headteacher, Mrs Julie Ball, aims to make this school as welcoming as possible for any new pupils.

== Sport ==
The village has a Cricket Club playing in the Shropshire County Cricket League. In June 2016 it celebrated its 50th anniversary. At the end of the 2016 season the team finished third from bottom of the Premier Division and they were relegated to Division One. However the villagers finished the 2017 season as Division One champions to gain a return to the Premier Division.

The village has a Sunday football team which reformed in August 2015.
