= North Shropshire College =

Coordinates: 52.854°N 3.038°W

Location
- Shrewsbury Road; Oswestry, Shropshire, SY11 4QB; England

Information
- Type: Further education college
- Motto: Shaping Futures
- Established: 2001
- Founder: Ron Pugh
- Local authority: Shropshire
- Department for Education URN: 130797 Tables
- Ofsted: Reports
- Chair: G. P. Richards
- Principal: David Williams
- Gender: Male & Female
- Age: 16+
- Telephone: 01691 688000
- Fax: 01691 688001
- Email: enquiries@nsc.ac.uk
- Website: http://www.nsc.ac.uk

North Shropshire College is a further education college in Shropshire, England and is part of Herefordshire, Ludlow and North Shropshire College. It has campuses at Walford and Oswestry.

== Creation and branding ==
Walford and North Shropshire College was created in January 2001 following the merger of North Shropshire College in Oswestry and Whitchurch, and Walford College in Baschurch; Ron Pugh was appointed the principal of the merged college, and following his retirement was succeeded by Andrew Tyley. During the 2014-15 academic year, Walford & North Shropshire changed its name to North Shropshire College, with a new colour scheme and website to match.

2014 to 2018 logo

In November 2018 Herefordshire, Ludlow and North Shropshire College was created following the merger between Herefordshire and Ludlow College, and North Shropshire College. with a new colour scheme and website to match Herefordshire and Ludlow College's corporate Identity.

== Oswestry campus ==
The King Street Institute was founded in 1921 to meet the demands of the local mining and railway industries. In 1958 it moved to a site in College Road, and became the Oswestry College of Further Education.

In 1978 Oswestry Tertiary College was created during the Tertiary re-organization. It was renamed The North Shropshire College in 1991. It had three main campuses: College Road and Upper Brook Street in Oswestry, and Talbot Campus in Whitchurch. It signed a federated college agreement with Staffordshire University in 1997. At this time the college had a trading subsidiary called 'Mereside' to deal with the College's work with companies and a range of government-sponsored programmes; including coordinating communication for the government's "New Deal" initiative for the colleges in Shropshire.

Oswestry campus was upgraded in 2002 with multi-million pound refit. The technology block was replaced by a new three story block, and an extra floor was added to the main block.

New £1.3 million Business and IT Centre. including a major upgrade to the teaching kitchen and basic skills area was completed for the start of the autumn term 2008.

The start of the 2023/2024 academic year saw the opening of the new plumbing and electrical training centre, and the new hair and beauty training suite.

== Walford campus ==
Walford Campus is the agricultural, engineering and horticultural campus of the college. It also has the Harris Centre, state-of-the-art teaching accommodation for small animal care, veterinary medicine and horticulture. Opened officially by the Princess Royal in October 2007, this £2.7 million centre incorporates a range of 'eco-friendly' features, with over £350,000 spent on sustainable technologies, winning it the Royal Institution of Chartered Surveyors' regional award for sustainability in May 2007.

== Former campuses ==
The Shipley Centre was situated in Gardenlands, Shipley and offered animal management, animal care, child care and flower arranging courses. Due to poor uptake of places for the 2018-2019 academic year, the centre was closed in 2018.

The Talbot Campus was situated on the Whitchurch Business Park and was the third campus prior to the merger. The Campus was closed after the merger and its courses were integrated into the Oswestry and Walford Campuses.

== In media ==
From 1966 to 1981 the teaching block at the Walford campus was used in filming as the entrance to Crossroads Motel in the British TV soap of the same name, and the Georgian Walford Hall adjacent used in external shots of family home of the owning Richardson family. The latter still stands but the teaching block was demolished in 2010.
