= River Perry =

River in Shropshire, England

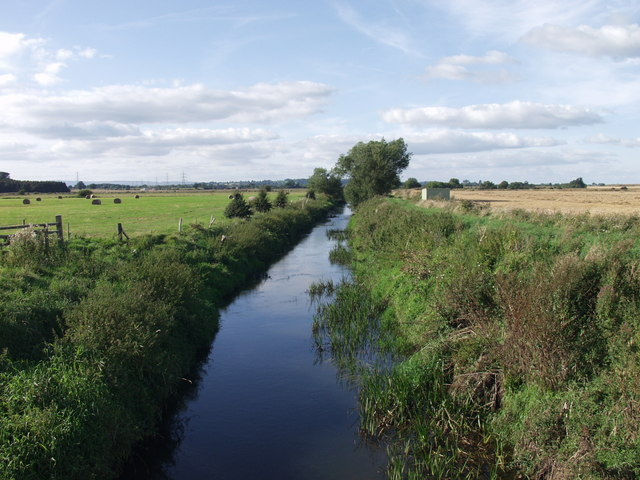
- The river crossing Baggy Moor

Location
- Country: England
- Counties: Shropshire

Physical characteristics
- Source
  - location: Springs near Gobowen
  - elevation: 260 m (850 ft)
- Mouth
  - location: River Severn, near Shrewsbury
  - coordinates: 52.7445°N 2.8308°W
  - elevation: 55 m (180 ft)
- Length: 39 km (24 mi)
- Discharge
  - location: Yeaton
  - average: 1.6 m^{3}/s (57 cu ft/s)

The River Perry is a river in Shropshire, England. It rises near Oswestry and flows south to meet the River Severn above Shrewsbury. Along its 24 miles (39 km) length, its level drops by some 320 feet (95 m). The channel has been heavily engineered, both to enable water mills to be powered by it, and to improve the drainage of the surrounding land. There were at least seven corn mills in the 1880s, and the last one remained operational until 1966. The middle section of the river crosses Baggy Moor, where major improvements were made in 1777 to drain the moor. The scheme was one of the largest to enclose and improve land in North Shropshire, and the quality of the reclaimed land justified the high cost. A section of the river bed was lowered in the 1980s, to continue the process.

The river is crossed by the Llangollen Canal, and by several bridges which are on the Listed Buildings register. It has formerly suffered from pollution, both from the discharge of poorly treated sewage from two treatment works, and from effluent from factories producing dairy products. These are now well-regulated, but the river was the scene of a major pollution incident in 1985, when pig slurry discharged into it, killing around 100,000 fish.

== Route ==
The river rises as a series of springs near Hengoed, to the west of Gobowen and to the north of Oswestry, close to the 500-foot (150 m) contour. It passes under the Shrewsbury to Ruabon railway line and the A5 road, to skirt around the northern edge of Gobowen. It is joined by several other streams, which also rise at springs to the west of Gobowen, some from as high as 850 feet (260 m) above sea level, and another which rises near New Marton, and flows south, passing under the Llangollen Canal.

Passing under the A495 road to the north of Whittington, it enters the parkland of Halston Hall, supplying a large ornamental lake. The river briefly heads south to leave the park, and then turns to the east, where it is crossed by the Montgomery Canal. At this point it is below the 260-foot (80 m) contour. The Perry aqueduct, which carries the canal over the river, was the scene of a major breach in 1936, which led to the canal closing. It was not reopened until 1987.

Next it turns to the south, passing through Baggy Moor, where it is joined by a large number of drainage ditches. The railway line crosses it again, before it reaches Ruyton-XI-Towns, where there is a large loop around higher ground to the east. The river is crossed by Platt Mill Bridge, designed and built in 1791 by Edward Cureton, although also attributed to Thomas Telford. The river forms the border between civil parishes at this point, and so one half of the bridge is in Ruyton-XI-Towns, while the other is in Baschurch. The bridge has two arches, and is a grade II listed structure. A circular toll-house, built of red sandstone with a conical slate roof, was erected in the late eighteenth or early nineteenth century close to the bridge, and is now used as a house. Continuing to the south-west of Baschurch, Milford Bridge is another two-arched structure, which carries the Baschurch to Little Ness road over the river. It was designed by Thomas Stanton in 1831, and was built by Nathaniel Edwards. Stanton was the civil engineer Thomas Telford's deputy at the time, when Telford was the County Surveyor of Bridges for Shropshire. The river passes along the south-western edge of Yeaton Peverey parkland, to reach Forton Heath, where there is a bridge with a single elliptical arch, built in the early nineteenth century, which carries the Mytton to Forton road. Below the bridge, the river joins the River Severn, close to the 180-foot (55 m) contour. The junction is not far from Shrewsbury, but the course of the Severn is much longer, as it flows around several large meanders to reach the town.

== Hydrology ==
The river rises on the edge of the North Shropshire sandstone plain, but for most of its length, the underlying rock is Bunter Sandstone. A series of streams converge to the east of Gobowen, which have risen further to the west at heights of up to 850 feet (260 m). Initially, the streams are stony-bottomed, but this is soon replaced by clays and alluvial silts. Near Rednal, the flow is augmented by the Tetchill Brook, which starts as an outflow from a large mere at Ellesmere. The outflow was a Victorian solution to control the levels of the mere. It is joined by Newnes Brook, which drains sandstone-based soils between Ellesmere and Gobowen. Below the junction the river crosses Baggy Moor, a large basin which was filled with peat, but which has been extensively drained to enable it to be used for agriculture. Prior to 1777, it was flooded every winter, but an Act of Parliament was then obtained, to authorise the improvement and enclosure of 1,283 acres (519 ha) of land. This was one of the largest areas enclosed in north Shropshire, and although the scheme was more costly and difficult than enclosing some of the dryer areas, the resultant land was more fertile, and so justified the cost.

Below the large meander at Ruyton, where a narrow valley cuts through sandstone, the bed flows over boulder clay with some glacial debris, and becomes stony again. The lower section retains some of its natural features, including meanders and riffle-pool sequences, which provide habitat for fish. Much of the upper section has been heavily modified, with the river canalised to improve flow. Between 1985 and 1988, the river bed between Ruyton and Rednal was lowered by about 3.4 feet (1.0 m), in order to improve the drainage of Baggy Moor.

Water quality is affected by discharges from Sewage Treatment Plants, including one which reaches the river from Oswestry via the Common Brook, and another which discharged into the Tetchill Brook at Ellesmere prior to 1999. The sewage works has since been closed, and improvements have been made to sewage outfalls and storm drains. In addition the brook has been dredged to remove polluted silts, and field studies have subsequently revealed that the quality of the brook is improving, measured by the diversity of invertebrates found in it. In addition, water quality is affected by effluent from factories processing dairy products. These and the sewage works outfalls are generally well-regulated, but there have been some serious pollution incidents as a result of poor agricultural practice. The worst was in September 1985, when 50,000 imperial gallons (230 m^{3}) of pig slurry was discharged into the river, resulting in the destruction of all of the fish populations down to the River Severn. A tank containing the slurry burst, and around 100,000 fish died as a result of the pollution.

Flow on the river is measured at three gauging stations. The furthest upstream is at Perry Farm, which uses a flat V triangular profile weir. That at Ruyton Bridge is a velocity area gauging station, while the final one is at Yeaton, where there is a Crump Profile weir. The catchment area above the Yeaton station is 69.8 square miles (180.8 km^{2}), which receives a mean rainfall of 30.2 inches (767 mm). This results in a mean flow of 30.4 million gallons per day (138.2 Mld), although a peak flow of 336 million gallons per day (1528 Mld) was recorded in February 1990.

== Water Quality ==
The Environment Agency measure water quality of the river systems in England. Each is given an overall ecological status, which may be one of five levels: high, good, moderate, poor and bad. There are several components that are used to determine this, including biological status, which looks at the quantity and varieties of invertebrates, angiosperms and fish. Chemical status, which compares the concentrations of various chemicals against known safe concentrations, is rated good or fail.

The water quality of the Perry and its tributaries was as follows in 2019.

Section	Ecological Status	Chemical Status	Length	Catchment
Perry - source to conf Common Bk	Moderate	Fail	4.8 miles (7.7 km)	14.94 square miles (38.7 km^{2})
Common Bk - source to conf R Perry	Poor	Fail	1.7 miles (2.7 km)	2.31 square miles (6.0 km^{2})
Perry from Common Bk to Tetchill Bk	Moderate	Fail	3.2 miles (5.1 km)	7.60 square miles (19.7 km^{2})
Tetchill Bk from source to River Perry	Poor	Fail	5.3 miles (8.5 km)	9.67 square miles (25.0 km^{2})
War Bk from source to River Perry	Poor	Fail	4.6 miles (7.4 km)	8.64 square miles (22.4 km^{2})
Perry from Tetchill Bk to River Severn	Moderate	Fail	12.6 miles (20.3 km)	19.95 square miles (51.7 km^{2})

Reasons for the ecological status being less than good include nutrients entering the river for agricultural land over most of the river system, with sewage discharge and physical modification of the channel affecting some parts. Like most rivers in the UK, the chemical status changed from good to fail in 2019, due to the presence of polybrominated diphenyl ethers (PBDE) which had not previously been included in the assessment.

== Milling ==
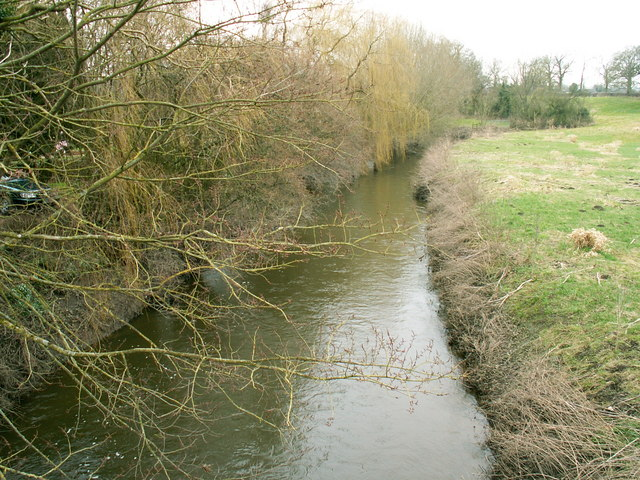
The river to the south of Mytton Bridge, just before it joins the River Severn

The river has been modified significantly to power water mills over the centuries. The furthest upstream was probably at Rednal Mill, which is thought to be the site of a water mill, but showed no signs of a water management system in 1875, although there appears to be a bypass channel to the north, and the administrative boundaries do not follow the main channel at this point. Between Ruyton and the River Severn, there were seven further corn mills, all of which are clearly marked on maps from 1880 to 1882.

New Mills was just below Platt Bridge, while Milford Mill was just above Milford Bridge. Adcote Mill was by Adcote Farm, and most of the channels can still be seen. There were two mills at Yeaton, the Upper Mill and the Lower Mill, either side of Yeaton Bridge, and the final two were Fitz Mill and Mytton Mill. Fitz Mill was operational between the twelfth century and 1926, and the structure is now used by a haulage company. Mytton Mill was operational until 1966, when production ceased. The building was unused until 1971, when it became offices for a building contractor. A fire caused severe damage in 1982, but the building has since been restored, and now provides workshops for a number of small businesses, including the building contractor.

== Points of interest ==
Point	Coordinates (Links to map resources)	OS Grid Ref	Notes
Spring near Hengoed	52.8939°N 3.0599°W	SJ287334	One of several sources
Spring near Pant-glas	52.8842°N 3.0941°W	SJ264324	One of several sources
Halston Hall lake	52.8764°N 2.9848°W	SJ338314	
Montgomery Canal crosses on aqueduct	52.8614°N 2.9522°W	SJ359297	
Railway bridge	52.8209°N 2.8939°W	SJ398251	
Site of New Mills Mill	52.7877°N 2.8839°W	SJ404214	
Milford Mill	52.7844°N 2.8625°W	SJ419211	
Adcote Mill	52.7707°N 2.8570°W	SJ422195	
Yeaton Upper Mill	52.7676°N 2.8452°W	SJ430192	
Fitz Mill	52.7574°N 2.8253°W	SJ444180	
Mytton Mill	52.7530°N 2.8310°W	SJ440175	
Junction with River Severn	52.7445°N 2.8308°W	SJ440166	

== Bibliography ==
- Baugh, G C; Elrington, C R (1989). A History of the County of Shropshire: Volume 4: Agriculture. Victoria County History / British History Online.
- Harper, David M (1990). "The ecology of a lowland sandstone river: The River Perry, Shropshire" (PDF). Field Studies. 7. Field Studies Council. Archived (PDF) from the original on 1 August 2019.
- Jones, Dr. J. A. A. (1997). Global Hydrology. Prentice Hall. ISBN 978-0-582-09861-9.
- Marsh, Terry; Hannaford, Jamie (2008). UK Hydrometric Register (PDF). Natural Environment Research Council. ISBN 978-0-9557672-2-7. Archived from the original (PDF) on 31 October 2014.
- Nicholson (2006). Nicholson Guide Vol 4 - Four Counties & the Welsh Canals. Harper Collins. ISBN 0-00-721112-0.
- Pearce, Fred (24 July 1986). A green unpleasant land. New Scientist.
- Squires, Roger (2008). Britain's restored canals. Landmark Publishing. ISBN 978-1-84306-331-5.
