= Baschurch =

Village in Shropshire, England

Coordinates: 52.791°N 2.854°W

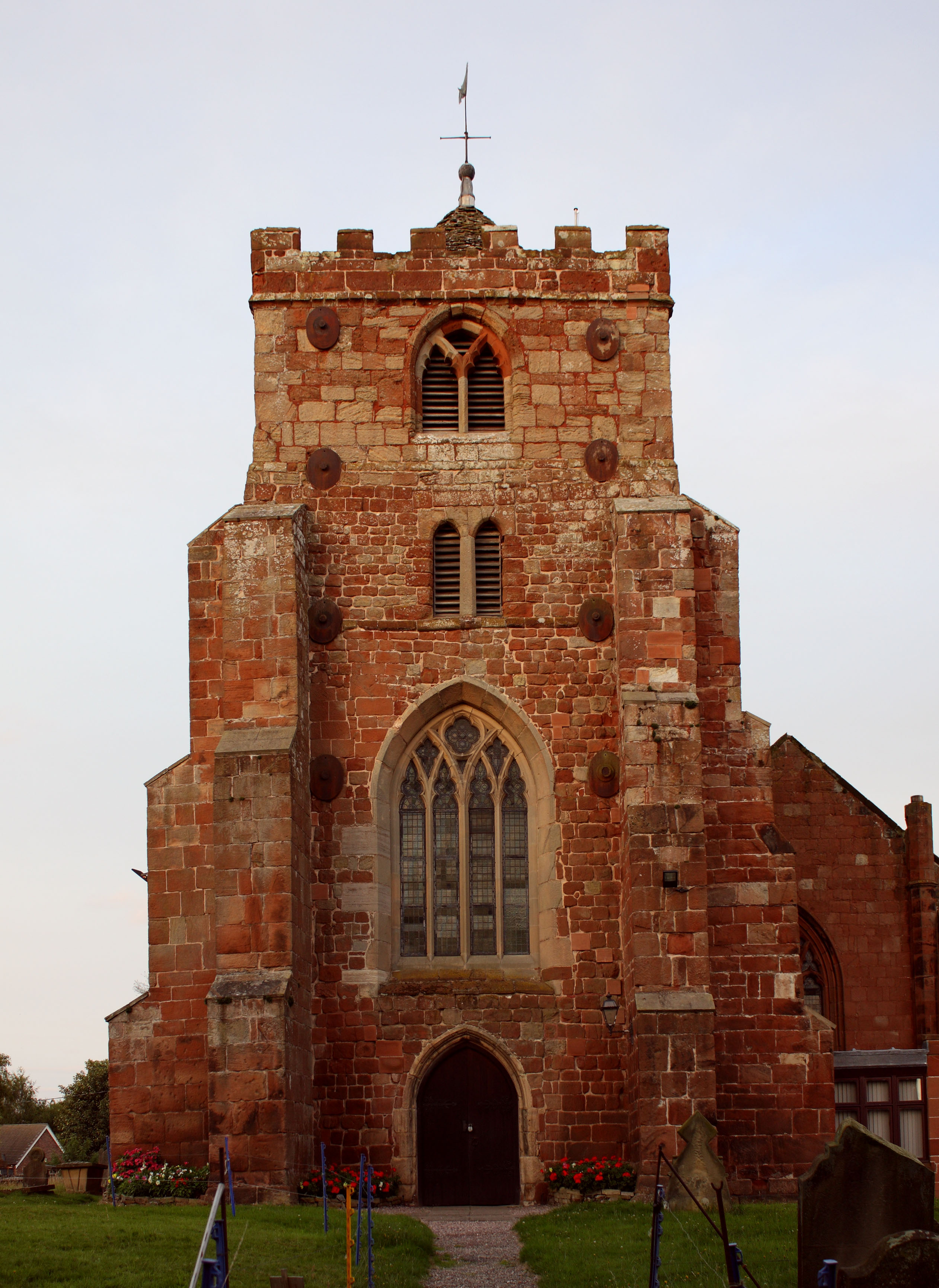
- Baschurch parish church

- Location within Shropshire
- Population: 2,854 (2021)
- OS grid reference: SJ4259321413
- Civil parish: Baschurch
- Unitary authority: Shropshire
- Ceremonial county: Shropshire
- Region: West Midlands
- Country: England
- Sovereign state: United Kingdom
- Post town: Shrewsbury
- Postcode district: SY4
- Dialling code: 01939
- Police: West Mercia
- Fire: Shropshire
- Ambulance: West Midlands
- UK Parliament: North Shropshire

Baschurch is a village and civil parish in Shropshire, England. It lies in the north of Shropshire. The village had a population of 2,854 as of the 2021 census. Shrewsbury is to the south-east, Oswestry is to the north-west, and Wem is to the north-east of Baschurch. The village is also close to Ruyton-XI-Towns.

== History ==
The earliest references to Baschurch are under its Welsh name Eglwyssau Bassa (Churches of Bassa), in a seven-stanza englyn-poem of the same name found in the Welsh cycle of poems called Canu Heledd, generally thought to date to the ninth century:

Eglwysseu bassa y orffowys heno.
y diwed ymgynnwys.
cledyr kat callon argoetwis.

Eglwysseu bassa ynt ffaeth heno.
vyn tauawt ae gwnaeth.
rud ynt wy rwy vy hiraeth.

Eglwysseu bassa ynt yng heno.
y etiued kyndrwyn[yn]
tir mablan kyndylan wynn.

Eglwysseu bassa ynt tirion heno.
ys gwaedlyt eu meillyon.
rud ynt wy. rwy vyng callon.

Eglwysseu bassa collassant eu breint.
gwedy y diua o loegyrwys.
kyndylan ac eluan powys.

Eglwysseu bassa ynt diua heno.
y chetwyr ny phara.
gwyr a wyr a mi yma.

Eglwysseu bassa ynt varuar heno.
a minneu wyf dyar.
rud ynt wy rwy vyg galar.

Translation:

Baschurch is his resting place tonight,
his final abode —
the support in battle, the heart of the men of Argoed.

Baschurch is ?crumbling tonight —
my tongue caused it.
It is reddened; too great is my sorrow.

Baschurch is confined tonight
for the heir of the Cyndrwynyn;
it is the land of the grave of Cynddylan Wyn.

Baschurch is ?fallow land tonight;
its clover is bloody.
It is reddened; too much is my emotion.

Baschurch has lost its privilege
after the slaying by English warriors
of Cynddylan and Elfan Powys.

Baschurch is destroyed tonight;
its warriors are no more.
Men know and me here.

Baschurch is glowing embers tonight
and I am sorrowful.
It is reddened; too great is my grief.

The English name Baschurch first appears in the Domesday Book of 1086 as Bascherche, and both names may derive from an Anglo-Saxon personal name Bass(a). Thus the name in Canu Heledd is a Brittonic version of an English name.

Local tradition holds that the Berth Pool and its ancient earthworks outside the village are the resting place of the legendary King Arthur.

In medieval times, several properties in the parish, including Adcote Mill, were owned by Haughmond Abbey near Shrewsbury.

Baschurch had a township called Boreatton, or Bratton, standing on the banks of the River Perry, with a country house called Bratton House.

The world's first orthopaedic hospital was established at Florence House in Baschurch by Sir Robert Jones and Dame Agnes Hunt in 1900 as a convalescent home for crippled children and later to treat wounded from the First World War. The hospital moved to Oswestry in 1921 and became the present Robert Jones and Agnes Hunt Orthopaedic Hospital.

In 2000 a large stone made of local sandstone was erected in the modern centre of the village to commemorate the Millennium. Similar smaller stones were erected in neighbouring communities.

== Churches ==
A major feature of the village is All Saints' Church (Church of England) which is one of the oldest standing structures in the village (perhaps the oldest). A timber church which burnt down is believed to have stood on the same site previously. Leading engineer and builder Thomas Telford made numerous major alterations to the modern sandstone church.

The village also had a Methodist chapel which was built in 1873 and closed in 2014 after the congregation had "dwindled to less than a dozen". It was sold for conversion into a house in April 2015.

== Twin town ==
Baschurch is twinned with the town of Giat in the French département of Puy-de-Dôme, in the Auvergne-Rhône-Alpes région.

- Giat, France

== Education ==
The village has two schools including Baschurch Church of England Primary School, and the Corbet School formerly known as Baschurch Secondary Modern School. Just outside the village is Walford College, an agricultural and sports college which in 2002 merged with Oswestry-based North Shropshire College to form Walford and North Shropshire College.

== Amenities ==
Baschurch has a number of amenities including a post office, a retained Shropshire Fire and Rescue Service fire station and a village hall located on Eyton Lane next to the Corbet School.

== Railways ==
The Shrewsbury to Chester Line passes through the village, though the Victorian railway station was closed to passengers in 1960 and goods trains in 1965.

On 13 February 1961 a passenger train travelling from Shrewsbury to Chester collided with a goods train which was partially shunted into a siding in Baschurch. Three people died in the accident. Television footage of the wreckage is available from the BBC.

There have been repeated efforts to bring the railway station back into use, most recently in autumn 2008, with the support of Baschurch Parish Council and the Shrewsbury-Chester Rail Users' Association. In September 2009, a public meeting organised by the Baschurch Station Group, was attended by 250 local people and received extensive media coverage.

== Notable people ==
- William Bebbington (1856 in Baschurch–1939) a cheese maker and member of the Queensland Legislative Assembly.
- Henry Eckford (1823-1905) cultivator of sweet peas, was gardener at home of Dr Sankey of Boreatton in the parish before moving to Wem in 1888.
- Dame Agnes Hunt DBE RRC (1866–1948 in Baschurch), a British nurse, recognised as the first orthopaedic nurse
- Rowland Hunt (1858-1943), brother of above, was Lord of the Manor of Baschurch, seated at Boreatton Hall, and Conservative politician.
- George Robert Jebb (1838 in Baschurch–1927) a civil engineer, prominent in the field of railway and canal engineering.
- Edward Lawrence (1623-1695) was Vicar of Baschurch from 1648 until ejected as a nonconformist in 1662 and continued to live in the parish until 1666.
- Henry David Leslie (1822–1896 in Baschurch) an English composer and conductor, supported amateur choral musicians.
- Benjamin Zephaniah (1958–2023) poet and musician, was a student at Boreatton Park Approved School in Baschurch.

=== Sports ===
- Callum Burton (born 1996 - ) professional footballer in goal for Shrewsbury Town to Wrexham. Lives in Baschurch where he runs a coffee shop.
- Alfred Payne (1849-1927), cricketer, lived at Walford Manor in the parish, in 1907.
- Dave Pountney (1939 in Baschurch - ) professional footballer for Shrewsbury Town, Aston Villa and Chester City.
- Jonnie Woodall MBE (1946-2009 in Baschurch) Olympian bobsleigher and luger, was killed in a cycling accident in Eyton Lane.

== Broadband internet ==
Baschurch was one of just six places in the United Kingdom to succeed in a competition held by BT to get super-fast broadband. The winners of the "Race to Infinity" competition were announced on 6 January 2011 and Baschurch came sixth. BT originally promised that only the top 5 places would go through with the upgrade (involving optic fibre-based infrastructure), but were impressed enough by the response in Baschurch. As of March 2018 much of the village has yet to be connected to super-fast broadband.

== See also ==
- Listed buildings in Baschurch
