= Forton Heath =

Hamlet in Shropshire, England

Coordinates: 52.753°N 2.832°W

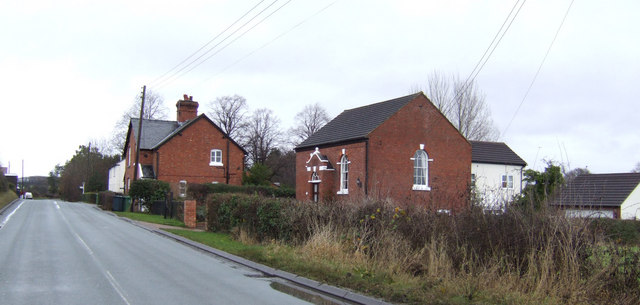
- Forton Heath

- Location within Shropshire
- OS grid reference: SJ438176
- Civil parish: Bomere Heath and District
- Unitary authority: Shropshire
- Ceremonial county: Shropshire
- Region: West Midlands
- Country: England
- Sovereign state: United Kingdom
- Post town: SHREWSBURY
- Postcode district: SY4
- Dialling code: 01743
- Police: West Mercia
- Fire: Shropshire
- Ambulance: West Midlands
- UK Parliament: Shrewsbury and Atcham

Forton Heath is a hamlet in the civil parish of Bomere Heath and District, in Shropshire, England. It is located north of Montford Bridge, near to the small village of Fitz and near to the hamlets of Broomfields, Mytton and Grafton.

There is a large disused airfield here which was sometimes known as Forton.
