= Broomfields =

Hamlet in Shropshire, England

Coordinates: 52.752°N 2.852°W

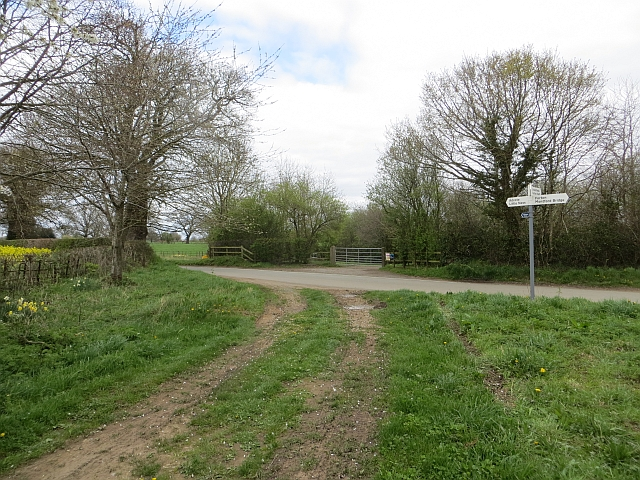
- Broomfields

- Location within Shropshire
- OS grid reference: SJ425175
- Civil parish: Montford
- Unitary authority: Shropshire
- Ceremonial county: Shropshire
- Region: West Midlands
- Country: England
- Sovereign state: United Kingdom
- Post town: SHREWSBURY
- Postcode district: SY4
- Dialling code: 01743
- Police: West Mercia
- Fire: Shropshire
- Ambulance: West Midlands
- UK Parliament: Shrewsbury and Atcham

Broomfields is a hamlet in Shropshire, England. It is located north of Montford Bridge and near to the hamlets of Forton Heath and Grafton. It is in the parish of Montford.

It used to have its own 7 1/4 gauge garden railway at Broomfields Villa called Broomfields Garden Railway (BGR) from the late 1980s until 2008 when the house was sold, a video can be seen here: https://www.youtube.com/watch?v=VLkMdJS7jho

Looking from Google Earth the trackbed around the field the track used to be is visible.

The railway was opened to the public a few times to raise money for the air ambulance.

More info about one of the model trains and a photo of it can be found here: GWR 1101 Class

== See also ==
- Listed buildings in Montford, Shropshire
