= Preston Gubbals =

Village in Shropshire, England

Coordinates: 52.771°N 2.753°W

Preston Gubbalds
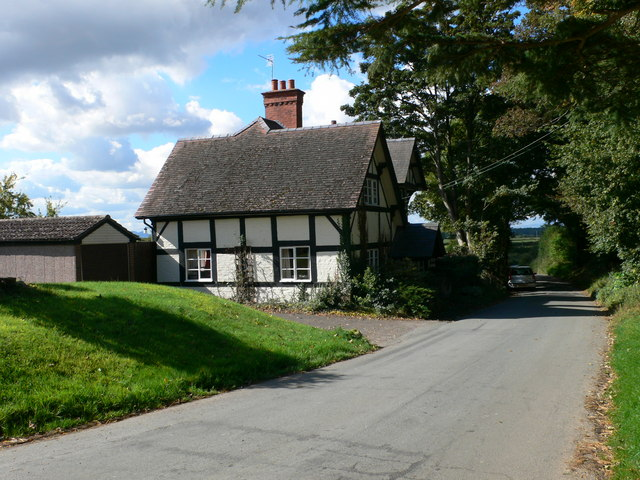
- Preston Gubbals

- Location within Shropshire
- OS grid reference: SJ492195
- Civil parish: Bomere Heath and District
- Unitary authority: Shropshire
- Ceremonial county: Shropshire
- Region: West Midlands
- Country: England
- Sovereign state: United Kingdom
- Post town: Shrewsbury
- Postcode district: SY4
- Dialling code: 01939
- Police: West Mercia
- Fire: Shropshire
- Ambulance: West Midlands
- UK Parliament: Shrewsbury and Atcham

Preston Gubbalds is a village in the civil parish of Bomere Heath and District, in the Shropshire district, in the ceremonial county of Shropshire, England. It lies on the A528 Shrewsbury-Ellesmere road. In 1931 the parish had a population of 440. Preston Gubbalds became a civil parish in 1866, on 1 April 1934 the parish was abolished to form Pimhill.

The name, spelt Preston Gubbalds or Preston Gobald in some historical sources, is derived from the Old English for "priest's settlement", along with the name of Godebold or Godbold, a priest who was subtenant of the manor in 1066 and at the time of the Domesday Book survey. The same man also held Preen, Lack, Atcham and Uckington. According to the Rotuli Hundredorum. [II. 75. 172] Preston Gobald coupled with Bosshall, was said to be held by [Sir] Thomas de Boshall, as mentioned in the Nomina Villlarum of 1316. To the west is the large village of Bomere Heath (once a hamlet of Preston Gubbals parish) and to the south is the small village of Albrighton.

The village church is dedicated to St. Martin and contains a mediaeval chancel, that became the south aisle when additions including a tower, nave and chancel, were made in the 19th century. It became redundant in 1973, the additions were demolished, and the building now belongs the Churches Conservation Trust.

To the north of the village, as the A528 passes by Pim Hill, is Lea Hall, a notable Elizabethan brick house, and its dovecote.

== See also ==
- Listed buildings in Bomere Heath and District
