= Fitz Manor =

Country house in Pimhill, Shropshire, England

Coordinates: 52.7555°N 2.8173°W

Fitz Manor is a manor house in the village of Fitz near Montford Bridge, Shropshire, England. It is a Grade II* listed building.

The manor, which overlooks the River Severn, was built in 1450, although the original structure is believed to have been a Saxon Hall. The manor was owned at one time by the bishop of Shrewsbury and it had its own church. In the 20th century it came into the ownership of the Baly family.

The rooms are named by colours, for instance the "Red Bedroom" and "Orange Bedroom".

The manor is reportedly haunted. There have been documented sightings of a homosexual priest who was purportedly crucified in the dining room, the figure of a lady in the red room and cemetery, and the ghost of a strong tobacco smoker smelt but not seen. The manor has been subject to an investigation by Most Haunted.

== See also ==
- Grade II* listed buildings in Shropshire Council (A–G)
- Listed buildings in Pimhill
