= Jonnie Woodall =

British sportsman

Personal information
- Full name: Jonathan William Woodall
- Nationality: British
- Born: 25 January 1946; Oxford, England
- Died: 3 April 2009 (aged 63); Baschurch, Shropshire, England

Sport
- Sport: Bobsleigh; Luge

Jonathan William Woodall, aka Jonnie Woodall MBE (25 January 1946 – 3 April 2009) was a British bobsledder and luger. He competed in the luge at the 1972 Winter Olympics and the bobsleigh at the 1980 Winter Olympics.

Woodall, who served in the British Army, retired from the army with the rank of Major and became race manager of the British Skeleton Association.

In later life Woodall lived at Mytton, near Montford Bridge in Shropshire. He was killed by being hit by a train on a level crossing whilst out cycling in nearby Eyton Lane, Baschurch.
