= Mytton, Shropshire =

Hamlet in Shropshire, England

Coordinates: 52.749°N 2.826°W

Mytton
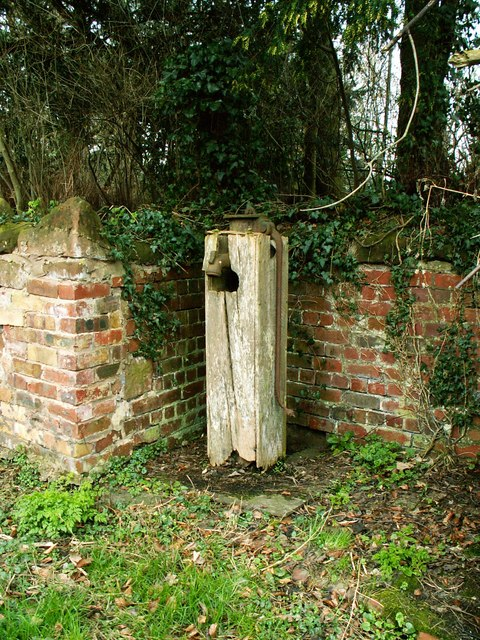
- Old roadside water pump in the hamlet of Mytton

- Location within Shropshire
- OS grid reference: SJ442171
- Civil parish: Bomere Heath and District; Montford
- Unitary authority: Shropshire
- Ceremonial county: Shropshire
- Region: West Midlands
- Country: England
- Sovereign state: United Kingdom
- Post town: SHREWSBURY
- Postcode district: SY4
- Dialling code: 01743
- Police: West Mercia
- Fire: Shropshire
- Ambulance: West Midlands
- UK Parliament: Shrewsbury and Atcham

Mytton is a hamlet in the civil parish of Bomere Heath and District, in Shropshire, England.

It is situated near to the small village of Fitz.

Jonnie Woodall (1946-2009), Olympian bobsledder and luger, lived in Mytton at the time of his death.
