= Crossgreen =

Hamlet in Shropshire, England

Coordinates: 52.741°N 2.778°W

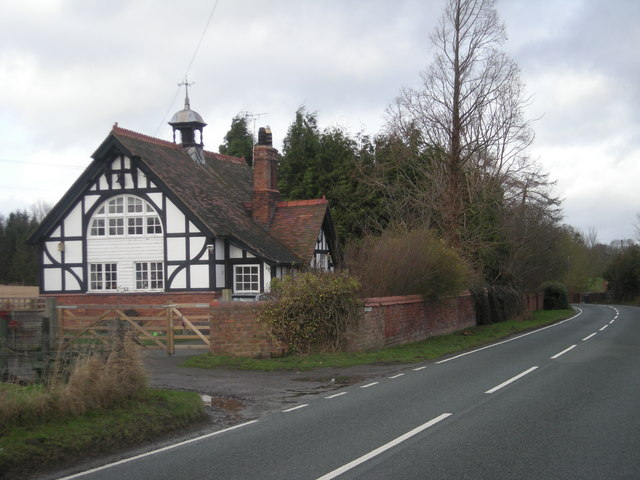
- House beside the B5067 at Crossgreen

- Location within Shropshire
- OS grid reference: SJ474162
- Civil parish: Bomere Heath and District
- Unitary authority: Shropshire
- Ceremonial county: Shropshire
- Region: West Midlands
- Country: England
- Sovereign state: United Kingdom
- Post town: SHREWSBURY
- Postcode district: SY4
- Dialling code: 01939
- Police: West Mercia
- Fire: Shropshire
- Ambulance: West Midlands
- UK Parliament: Shrewsbury and Atcham

Crossgreen is a hamlet in the civil parish of Bomere Heath and District (formerly Pimhill), in Shropshire, England.

It is situated on the B5067, Shrewsbury to Baschurch road, between Shrewsbury and the small village of Leaton.
