= Albrighton Hall, Shrewsbury =

House in Albrighton, near Shrewsbury, Shropshire, United Kingdom

Coordinates: 52.7588°N 2.7481°W

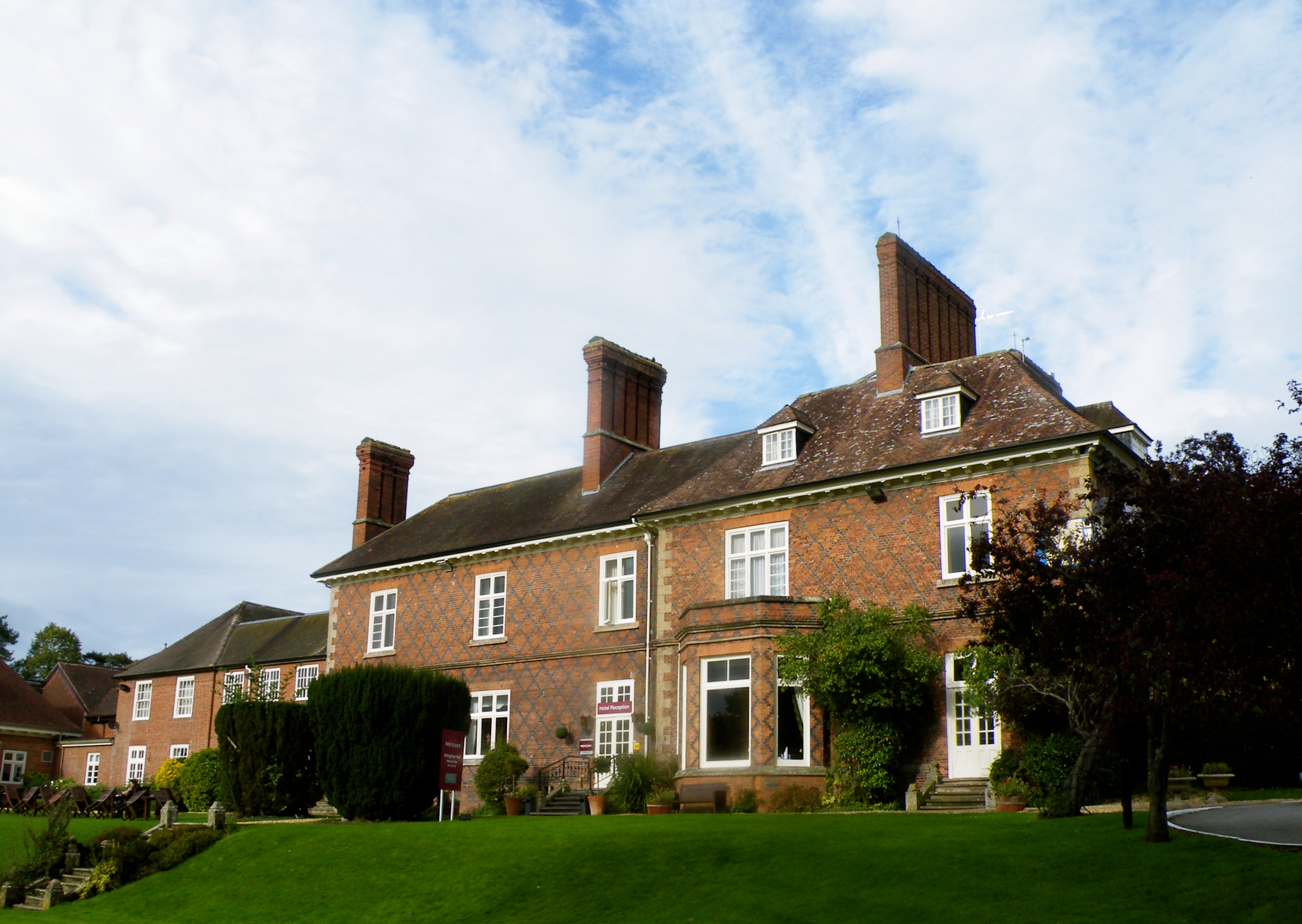
Albrighton Hall

Albrighton Hall near Shrewsbury, Shropshire, is a house which is Grade II* listed on the National Heritage List for England. It was built in 1630 for the Ireland family and remained in this family for the next five generations until 1804. It was then the home of several notable people until 1953. In the 1990s it was converted into a hotel. It is located at the village of Albrighton, in the parish of Bomere Heath and District.

== Early owners ==
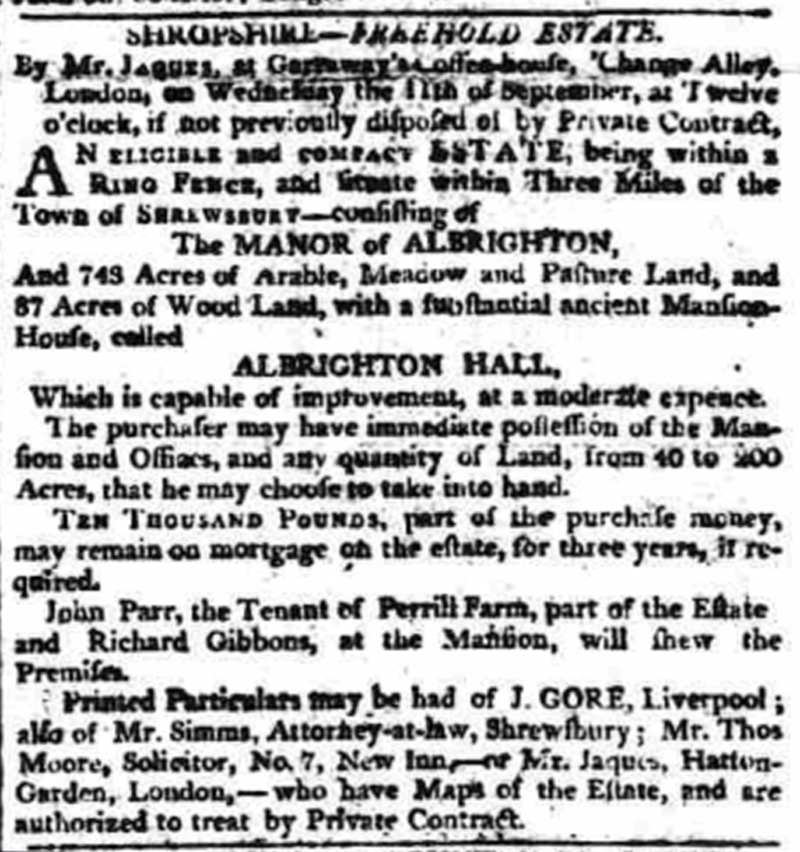
Advertisement for the sale of Albrighton Hall in 1805

Thomas Ireland, who was High Sheriff of Shropshire, built Albrighton Hall in about 1630. His family had owned the estate from about 1540. He had married Jane Dutton daughter of Rowland Dutton of Hatton Hall in Cheshire. The Hall descended through the male line of the Ireland family. The next couple were Thomas’s son Robert and his wife Lucie Leigh followed by Robert’s son Thomas Ireland and his wife Elizabeth. Their son Thomas who was married to Mary were the next heirs and when he died in 1729 his son Thomas Pershall Ireland became the owner. He did not marry and after his death in 1792 it passed to his daughter Mary. When she died in 1796 the property reverted to the Crown but shortly after was granted to his nephew John Ireland. In 1804 he sold the Hall to the Reverend Inigo William Jones. Jones (1780-1809) was the only surviving son of Henry Jones of Bloomsbury Square, London who had acquired an enormous fortune. He left a large part of it to Inigo when he died in 1801.

Inigo went to the University of Cambridge in 1796 at the age of 15 and obtained his degree. He was ordained a cleric in 1804. In the same year he bought Albrighton Hall and married Margaret Elizabeth Gale daughter of Colonel Gale of Bardsea Hall Lancashire.

In 1809 at the age of only 29 he died and his son also called Inigo William Jones who at this time was only three years old inherited Albrighton Hall. It was held in trust for him until he came of age and then in 1830 he sold it to William Spurrier of Birmingham.

William Spurrier (1768-1848) was an attorney in Birmingham. In 1793 he married Eleanor Boole and the couple had five children. They lived in Heath Green House near Birmingham and rented Albrighton Hall to wealthy tenants. One of these was Sir Richard Puleston who signed a lease in 1834.

Sir Richard Puleston (1765-1840) was born Richard Price, son of Richard Parry Price and Anne Puleston. When his uncle John Puleston of Emral, Flintshire in Wales died unmarried in 1812 he inherited his estates and changed his name to Puleston. In 1813 he was made a Baronet. Richard married twice. His first wife died shortly after their marriage after giving birth to two children. He married secondly, in 1796, Emma Elizabeth Corbet (1781-1849) who was the daughter of John Corbet of Sundorne. Her mother was Emma Leighton daughter of Sir Charlton Leighton. They had no children.

Richard died in 1840 and Lady Emma Elizabeth Puleston continued to reside at Albrighton Hall. She is recorded in the 1841 Census as living there with seven servants. She died in 1849 and in the following year her extensive range of furniture was sold. The sale was a major event and lasted for six days. The advertisement for the sale is shown here.

== Later owners ==
In 1848 William Spurrier died and his daughter Mary inherited the house. Mary was the wife of General Edward Mortlock Studd. He sold the property in 1853 to William Hanbury Sparrow of Penn Court. He did not live there and instead rented it to wealthy tenants. One of these was William Cope (1813-1885) a barrister who lived there from about 1855 until 1870. He is listed in the book “Shropshire Arms and Lineages”.

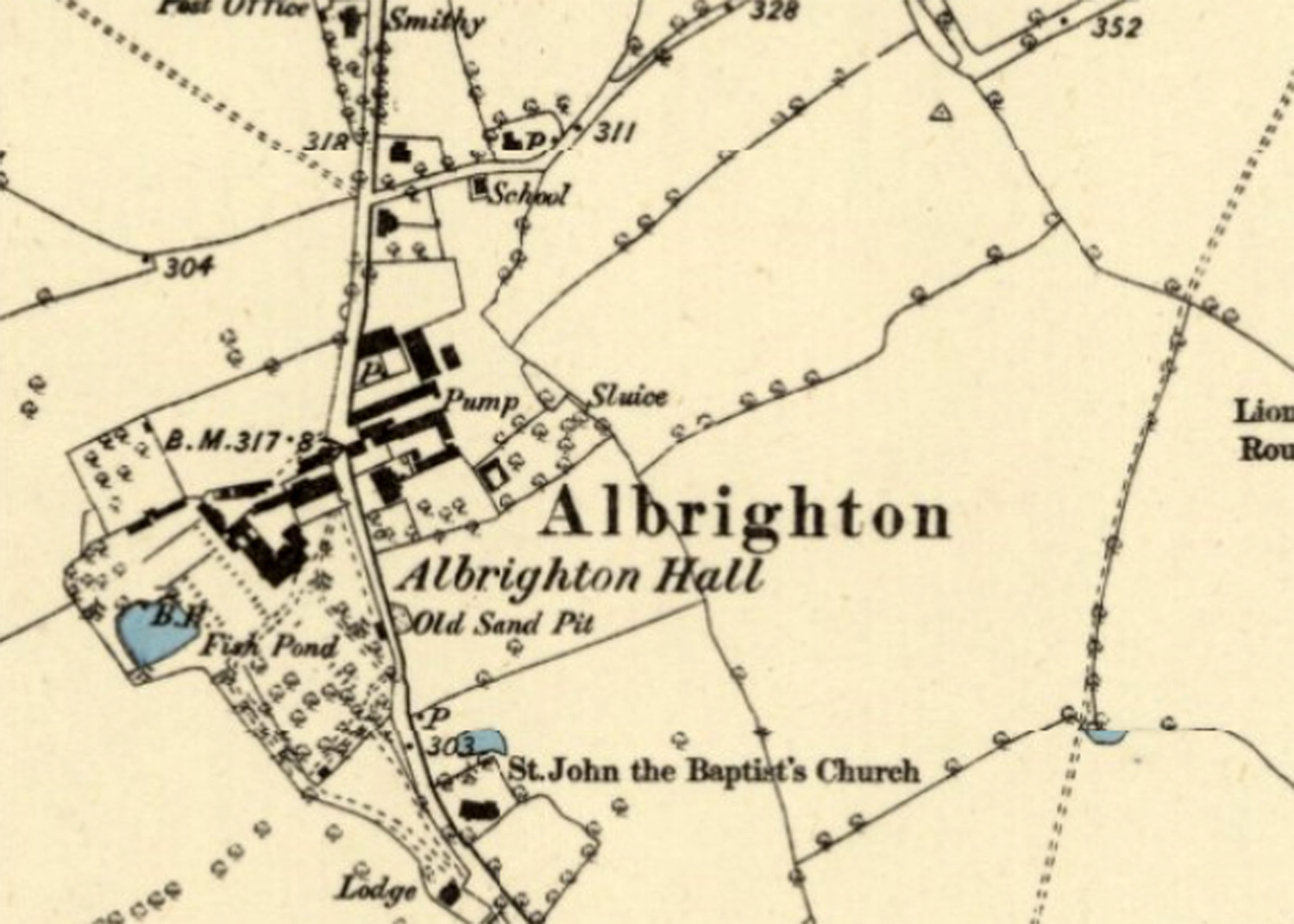
Map Albrighton 1881

William Hanbury Sparrow died in 1867 and the house was inherited by his son William Mander Sparrow (1812-1881). He owned the Horsely Fields Iron and Tin Plate Works, and the Osier Bed blast furnaces at Wolverhampton. He was also a Justice of the Peace for the counties of Staffordshire and Shropshire, a Deputy-Lieutenant for the county of Stafford, and served the office of High Sheriff for that county in 1873. He moved into Albrighton Hall with his wife Alice when William Cope moved out in 1870. They had no children so when he died in 1881 the Hall was inherited by his nephew William Arthur Brown.

William Arthur Brown (1847-1913) was the son of George Gwynn Brown of Mytton Grange, Stourport and his mother was Louisa Sparrow sister of William Mander Sparrow. When he inherited his uncle’s property he changed his name to Sparrow. He married in 1873 Amy Ellen Baldwin, daughter of George Baldwin, an ironmaster. The couple had three sons and two daughters. When he died in 1913 his eldest son George William Sparrow inherited the house.

Captain George William Sparrow (1876-1918) was educated at the University of Oxford and helped his father run the estate. When the First World War started in 1914 he joined the King's Shropshire Light Infantry. He survived almost the whole War then in October 1918 he was hit by a sniper bullet in France and was killed. Albrighton Hall was inherited by his brother John Arthur Gwynn Sparrow.

John Arthur Gwynn Sparrow (1880-1956) was a medical doctor. He became High Sheriff of Shropshire in 1930. During the Second World War the Convent of the Sacred Heart at Tunbridge Wells was evacuated to the Hall, where Catholic priest, poet and editor Henry Edward George Rope was chaplain. Sparrow sold the Hall and in 1953 it was converted to accommodate male students of the Royal National College for the Blind when based in Shropshire. It was bought by Macdonald Hotels in the late 1990s, and then by Mercure Hotels in April 2007.

== See also ==
- Grade II* listed buildings in Shropshire Council (A–G)
- Listed buildings in Pimhill
