= Listed buildings in Montford, Shropshire =

Montford is a civil parish in Shropshire, England. It contains 20 listed buildings that are recorded in the National Heritage List for England. Of these, two are at Grade II*, the middle of the three grades, and the others are at Grade II, the lowest grade. The parish contains the villages and smaller settlements of Broomfields, Montford, Montford Bridge, and Shrawardine, and the surrounding countryside. Most of the listed buildings are houses, cottages and farmhouses, the earliest of which are timber framed or have timber-framed cores. The other listed buildings include the remains of a castle, two churches, a tomb in a churchyard, two bridges, three milestones, a former toll house, and a former lodge.

== Key ==
Grade	Criteria
II*	Particularly important buildings of more than special interest
II	Buildings of national importance and special interest

== Buildings ==
Name and location	Photograph	Date	Notes	Grade
Remains of Shrawardine Castle; 52.73269°N 2.88910°W		12th century	The remains are in sandstone, and include the motte, three crags of masonry, and the base of a wall with three arches.	II
Forton East Farmhouse; 52.73899°N 2.84698°W	—	Late 14th to early 15th century	The farmhouse has a timber framed core with cruck construction. It was later extended, and then remodelled in the 19th century with the addition of a south wing. The farmhouse is in brick with dentilled eaves and a slate roof. There are two storeys, and most of the windows are casements.	II
The Critt; 52.73102°N 2.89271°W	—	15th century (probable)	A house, since divided, it was extended in the 17th century, partly rebuilt or refaced in the 19th century, and further extended in the 20th century. It is timber framed with cruck construction and brick infill, the extensions are in brick, and the roof is tiled. It has one storey and attics, it originated as a hall house, with later additions, and has four or five bays. There is a lean-to porch, most of the windows are casements, and there are five gabled eaves dormers.	II
St Mary's Church; 52.73181°N 2.89070°W		1649	The earliest substantial part of the church is the nave, the chancel dates from 1722, and both incorporate 12th-century material. Alterations were made in 1869, and the church was restored and the vestry added in 1892. The church is in sandstone with a slate roof, and consists of a nave, a south porch, a west vestry, and a chancel. On the west gable is a square weatherboarded bellcote with a pyramidal roof and a weathervane.	II*
Whisperwood Cottage; 52.73394°N 2.89070°W	—	Mid 17th century	A timber framed cottage with brick infill, some rebuilding in brick, and a tile roof. It has one storey and an attic, and three bays. There is a gabled porch, the windows are casements, some with segmental heads, and in the centre is a full dormer with a jettied gable.	II
Thatched Cottage, Shrawardine; 52.73311°N 2.89079°W		17th century	The cottage is timber framed with brick infill, it has been partly rebuilt in brick painted to resemble timber framing, and has a thatched roof. There is one storey and an attic, and four bays. On the front is a gabled porch, the windows are casements, and there are two eyebrow dormers.	II
Pool House; 52.75956°N 2.86466°W	—	Late 17th century	A timber framed cottage with plaster infill on a brick plinth with a slate roof. There is one storey and an attic and two bays, a two-storey rear wing with one bay, and a rear outshut. There are gabled porches on the front and at the rear, the windows are casements, and there is a gabled eaves dormer.	II
Glebe House; 52.73157°N 2.89042°W	—	18th century	A rectory, later a private house, it has been altered and extended. The house is in brick with plat bands, a tile roof, two storeys and an attic, and three bays. The porch has a hipped roof, and the windows are sashes.	II
St Chad's Church; 52.72751°N 2.86192°W		1737–38	The church was restored and the porch was added in 1884. It is built in red sandstone with slate roofs, and consists of a nave, a north porch, a chancel, and a west tower. The tower has three stages, a clock face in the north front, an embattled parapet and a weathervane. The windows in the body of the church have round heads, moulded surrounds, pilasters, and keystones, and the east window has three lights with pointed heads.	II*
Ensdon House; 52.74684°N 2.86729°W	—	Late 18th century	A small country house, it is in red brick on a plinth, with a moulded stone eaves cornice and a two-span slate roof with parapeted and coped gables. There are two storeys and an attic and basement at the front and three storeys at the rear. The front has five bays, the middle three bays projecting under a triangular pediment. A flight of seven steps with wrought iron railings and a handrail lead up to a doorway that has Doric pilasters, a moulded architrave and keystone, a fanlight with intersecting Gothick tracery, a triglyph frieze, and a triangular pediment. The windows vary, and include Venetian windows, lunettes, mullioned and transomed casement windows, cross-windows, and horizontally-sliding sash windows.	II
Montford Bridge; 52.73251°N 2.84276°W		1790–92	The bridge, by Thomas Telford, carries the B4380 road over the River Severn, and was altered in 1963. It is in red sandstone, and consists of three elliptical arches. The arches have chamfered voussoirs, and raised keystones, and are divided by wide pilasters strips and semicircular cutwaters. The bridge has balustrades and wing walls curving out to circular end piers.	II
Beam House Farmhouse; 52.75710°N 2.87795°W	—	Late 18th or early 19th century	The farmhouse is in red brick with a dentil eaves cornice and a slate roof. There are two storeys and an attic, three bays, and two gabled rear wings. In the centre is a lattice porch, the windows are mullioned and transomed with segmental heads, and there are three gabled eaves dormers with horizontally-sliding sash windows.	II
The Round House; 52.73318°N 2.84318°W		Late 18th or early 19th century	Originally a toll house, it was extended later in the 19th century. It is in sandstone with a pyramidal slate roof, and the extension is in brick. It has two storeys, an octagonal plan with corner pilasters, and the extension has one storey. On the front is a gabled porch, the windows in the original part are small and square or rectangular, and in the extension there is a casement window.	II
Matthews memorial 52.72741°N 2.86196°W	—	1815	The memorial is in the churchyard of St Chad's Church, and is to the memory of members of the Matthews family. It is a pedestal tomb in grey sandstone. The tomb has a moulded plinth, recessed side panels with reeded architraves, a fluted frieze, a moulded cornice, and large urn finial.	II
Broomfields Farmhouse; 52.75292°N 2.85238°W	—	Early 19th century	The farmhouse is in red brick on a plinth, with a slate roof. There are two storeys, an attic and a basement, five bays, and two gabled one-storey rear wings. Steps with flanking low walls lead up to the central doorway that has pilasters, a three-part rectangular fanlight, and a triangular pediment on shaped brackets. The windows are sashes with segmental heads.	II
Mytton Bridge; 52.74810°N 2.83199°W	—	Early 19th century	The bridge carries a road over the River Perry. It is in red sandstone and consists of a single elliptical arch. The bridge has a flat string course, a raised keystone, and wing walls that curve out to circular end piers.	II
Milestone near Beam House Farmhouse; 52.75385°N 2.88282°W		1826–27	The milestone is on the south side of the A5 road. It is in limestone with a shallow-pitched top and chamfered corners, and carries a cast iron plate inscribed with the distances in miles to Holyhead and to "SALOP" (Shrewsbury).	II
Milestone near Ensdon House; 52.74382°N 2.86586°W		1826–27	The milestone is on the south side of the A5 road. It is in limestone with a shallow-pitched top and chamfered corners, and carries a cast iron plate inscribed with the distances in miles to Holyhead and to "SALOP" (Shrewsbury).	II
Milestone near Forton Cottage; 52.73504°N 2.84945°W		1826–27	The milestone is on the south side of the B4380 road. It is in limestone with a shallow-pitched top and chamfered corners, and carries a cast iron plate inscribed with the distances in miles to Holyhead and to "SALOP" (Shrewsbury).	II
Adcote Lodge; 52.76246°N 2.86607°W		1879	A lodge to Adcote designed by Richard Norman Shaw, it is in sandstone on a chamfered plinth, with chamfered bands, and a tile roof with parapeted and coped gables. There is one storey with an attic. To the left is a projecting gabled bay containing mullioned windows. In the centre is a recessed porch with a Tudor arched doorway, to the right of this is a square bay window containing cross-windows, and above is a raking dormer with a casement window.	II
