= Shrawardine =

Village in Shropshire, England

Coordinates: 52.732°N 2.89°W

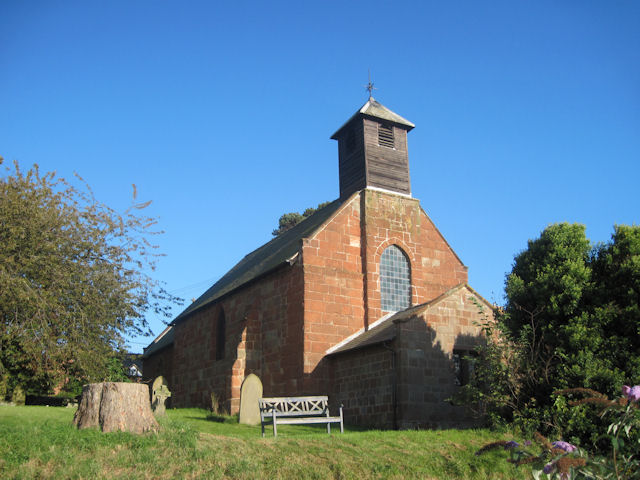
- St Mary The Virgin Church, Shrawardine

- Location within Shropshire
- OS grid reference: SJ399153
- Civil parish: Montford; Alberbury with Cardeston (Little Shrawardine)
- Unitary authority: Shropshire
- Ceremonial county: Shropshire
- Region: West Midlands
- Country: England
- Sovereign state: United Kingdom
- Post town: SHREWSBURY
- Postcode district: SY3
- Dialling code: 01743
- Police: West Mercia
- Fire: Shropshire
- Ambulance: West Midlands
- UK Parliament: Shrewsbury

Shrawardine is a small village and former civil parish, now in the parish of Montford, in the Shropshire district, in the ceremonial county of Shropshire, England. It is 5.9 miles (9.5 km) outside Shrewsbury. In 1931 the parish had a population of 176. On 1 April 1934 the parish was abolished and merged with Montford.

== Etymology ==
Its name is locally pronounced Shray-den, and was often spelt "Shraydon" in old documents; it is otherwise pronounced Shray-war-dine. The placename originates from Old English worðign "enclosed settlement" combined with either scraef "cave" or screawa "shrew", the latter used as a byname for an individual.

== Landmarks ==
The village's landmarks include Shrawardine Castle and St Mary's Church. The castle, known as Castell Isabella by the Anglo-Normans, was built in the reign of Henry I of England, and dismantled during the English Civil War in 1645. It had been held since 1644 by the Royalist commander Sir William Vaughan, whose aggressive tactics earned him the nickname "the Devil of Shrawardine". St Mary's Church dates from the 17th century and is a Grade II* listed building.

== Little Shrawardine ==
The River Severn passes to the west of the village. On the other side of the river is a hamlet called Little Shrawardine. It lies within the civil parish of Alberbury with Cardeston.

== Notable residents ==
- Henry Bromley (died 1615), Elizabethan and Jacobean politician, owned Shrawardine Castle where he died.
- Rev Dr Nevil Maskelyne FRS FRSE, the fifth Astronomer Royal, was Rector of the parish 1775 to 1782.
- Jane Gray (stained glass artist), b.1931–d.2024, had a workshop in Shrawardine.

== Transport ==
Shrawardine once had a railway station with a single platform, which finally closed in 1933.

== See also ==
- Listed buildings in Montford, Shropshire
