= St Martin's Church, Preston Gubbals =

Coordinates: 52.7717°N 2.7546°W

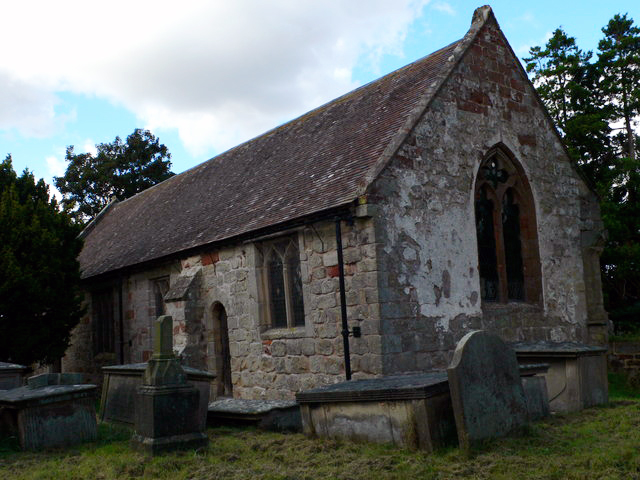
- St Martin's Church, Preston Gubbals, from the southeast

- Location in Shropshire
- OS grid reference: SJ 491 196
- Location: Preston Gubbals, Shropshire
- Country: England
- Denomination: Anglican
- Website: Churches Conservation Trust

History
- Dedication: Saint Martin

Architecture
- Functional status: Redundant
- Heritage designation: Grade II*
- Designated: 13 June 1958
- Architect: Samuel Pountney Smith
- Architectural type: Church
- Style: Gothic, Gothic Revival

Specifications
- Materials: Sandstone, tile roof

St Martin's Church is a redundant Anglican church in the village of Preston Gubbals, Shropshire, England. It is recorded in the National Heritage List for England as a designated Grade II* listed building, and is under the care of the Churches Conservation Trust.

== History ==
St Martin's originated as a chapel of ease, and what now remains was the chancel of a medieval parish church. It was probably altered in the 14th or the 15th century. In 1866 a new church was added to it, and it became the south aisle of that church. This enlargement was designed by Samuel Pountney Smith, and cost £1,600 (equivalent to £160,000 in 2025). In 1973 most of the work carried out in 1866 was demolished, leaving a single-cell building. The arcade of the 1866 building has been retained, it has been blocked, and forms the north wall of the present building. A bell formerly in the church is now the Sanctus bell in St Alkmund's Church, Shrewsbury. It was cast in 1720 by Abraham Rudhall of Gloucester. The church was declared redundant on 1 June 1973, and was vested in the Churches Conservation Trust on 14 November 1974.

== Architecture ==
=== Exterior ===
The building is constructed in sandstone with a tile roof. The nave and chancel form a single cell. The south side of the church contains two buttresses, three square-headed windows with two or three lights, a round-arched priest's door from the 12th century, and a 19th-century doorway. On the north side is the former nave arcade in three bays into which 20th-century three-light windows have been inserted. At the west end are round-arched windows, and a doorway that formerly led to the tower staircase. The east end contains a two-light window.

=== Interior ===
Many of the carved wooden fittings were made by Rev E. D. Poole, the vicar of the church in the 19th century. These include the altar table and the reredos, the choir stalls, the pews, the lectern and the pulpit. On each side of the altar are boards containing the Ten Commandments, the Creed, and the Lord's Prayer. The octagonal stone font dates probably from the 16th century; it has a 19th-century base and cover. The oak parish chest dates probably from the 17th century. To the left of the south door is a royal coat of arms, and on the east wall is a pair of benefactors' boards. The monuments include a stone coffin slab from the 14th century carved with the bust of a man above a foliated cross.

There are a variety of war-related memorials inside:

- Plaque to Flora Constance Kelly, missionary wife of a former Rector, who died a victim of the Boxer Rebellion in 1900.
- Roll of Honour to men of the parish who served in World War I.
- Stained-glass window in south wall to Lance Corporal William Williams, Welsh Guards, killed in action in World War I in 1918, as well as to Edward and Marie Williams and Stephen Lacey, all three men said to be longstanding friends.

== External features ==
In the churchyard is a sundial that was originally a churchyard cross. It is dated 1638, is octagonal and is constructed in sandstone. It consists of a chamfered base and two steps, on which is a baluster and a copper dial plate. It is listed at Grade II.

The churchyard contains a war grave of a soldier of World War I. Also buried in the churchyard, within a family grave, are the ashes of Archdeacon the Earl of Cavan (died 1950), a chaplain veteran of the same war.

The parish war memorial, in the form of a marble cross listing the dead from both World Wars, including a local World War I soldier named Martin Luther (ironic in a war against Germany), stands in the churchyard.

== See also ==
- List of churches preserved by the Churches Conservation Trust in the English Midlands
- Grade II* listed buildings in Shropshire Council (A–G)
- Listed buildings in Pimhill
