= Dunnsheath =

Hamlet in Shropshire, England

Coordinates: 52.753°N 2.779°W

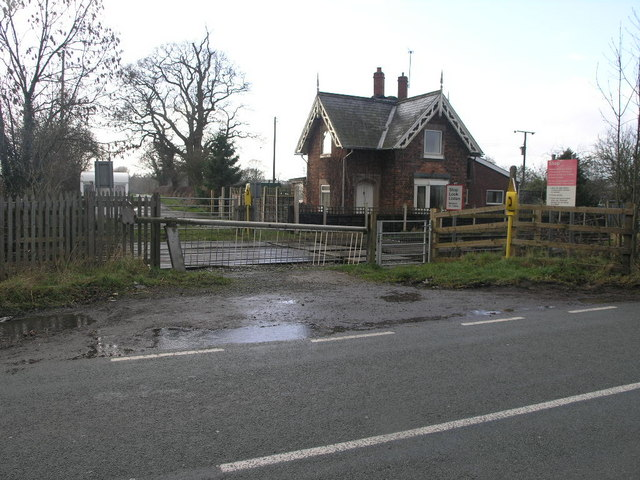
- A house adjacent to the level crossing, on the Shrewsbury to Chester Line, at Dunnsheath

- Location within Shropshire
- OS grid reference: SJ474175
- Civil parish: Bomere Heath and District
- Unitary authority: Shropshire
- Ceremonial county: Shropshire
- Region: West Midlands
- Country: England
- Sovereign state: United Kingdom
- Post town: SHREWSBURY
- Postcode district: SY4
- Dialling code: 01939
- Police: West Mercia
- Fire: Shropshire
- Ambulance: West Midlands
- UK Parliament: Shrewsbury and Atcham

Dunnsheath is a hamlet in the civil parish of Bomere Heath and District, in Shropshire, England. It is sometimes spelt as "Dunn's Heath".

It is situated on the B5067, Shrewsbury to Baschurch road. Just to the north is the small village of Leaton.
