= Listed buildings in Bomere Heath and District =

Bomere Heath and District is a civil parish in Shropshire, England. It contains 67 listed buildings that are recorded in the National Heritage List for England. Of these, twelve are at Grade II*, the middle of the three grades, and the others are at Grade II, the lowest grade. The parish is to the northwest of Shrewsbury, it contains the villages of Albrighton, Atcham, Fitz, Leaton, Merrington and Preston Gubbals and smaller settlements, and is otherwise rural. In the parish are a former manor house and seven country houses that are listed, together with structures associated with them. Otherwise, most of the listed buildings are smaller houses, cottages, farmhouses and farm buildings, the older of which are timber framed, or have timber-framed cores. The other listed buildings include churches and items in the churchyards, a private chapel, a group of almshouses, an eyecatcher, a war memorial, and five mileposts,

== Key ==
Grade	Criteria
II*	Particularly important buildings of more than special interest
II	Buildings of national importance and special interest

== Buildings ==
Name and location	Photograph	Date	Notes	Grade
St Martin's Church, Preston Gubbals; 52.77173°N 2.75459°W		12th century	The church was expanded in the 14th and 15th centuries, and was partly rebuilt and further extended in 1866 by S. Pountney Smith, but most of the 1866 work was demolished in 1973, and the church is now redundant. It is built in sandstone with a tile roof, and consists of a nave and a chancel in one cell. On the south side is a large buttress, and the north wall retains the 1866 arcade.	II*
Fitz Manor; 52.75555°N 2.81739°W	—	c. 1450	The house has been remodelled and extended on a number of occasions. The original part is timber framed on a sandstone plinth with brick infill, later parts have applied timber framing, or are rebuilt or refaced in brick, and the roof is tiled and hipped to the left. The original part has two storeys and an attic, and later parts have two storeys. The house has an E-shaped plan, with a three-bay hall range and three three-bay cross-wings. On the front is a timber-framed porch with a Tudor arch, and the doorway has a moulded architrave. The windows are a mix of sashes and casements, and there is a canted bay window. The gables at the rear have ornamental bargeboards.	II*
Moat retaining wall and bridge, Albright Hussey; 52.75338°N 2.73908°W	—	15th or 16th century (probable)	The wall and bridge are in grey sandstone; the wall is about 60 metres (200 ft) long. The bridge over the moat dates probably from the 16th or 17th century, and consists of a small round arch with chamfered coping, and the parapet was probably rebuilt later.	II
Albright Hussey; 52.75358°N 2.73928°W		1524	A country house later altered and expanded and used for other purposes. The original part is timber framed with plaster infill, the later parts are in red brick with sandstone dressings, and the roof is tiled. The original part has two storeys, the extension has three, and the rear range has two storeys and an attic. The upper floor of the original part is jettied with a moulded bressumer, and the porch is jettied on three sides. The later part has quoins and moulded string courses. The windows are mullioned and transomed, and there are square oriel windows.	II*
Mytton Farmhouse; 52.74841°N 2.82686°W	—	16th century (probable)	The farmhouse was remodelled in the 19th century. It is timber framed on a brick plinth, later rendered, and has a slate roof. There is one storey and an attic, and an L-shaped plan, consisting of a two-bay range, and a rear wing of two long bays and one short bay. In the centre is a porch with an open pedimented gable, and a doorway with a radial fanlight. The windows are small-paned casements with pedimented hoods on brackets, and there are two gabled dormers with bargeboards and finials.	II
Barn northwest of Lea Hall; 52.78489°N 2.75468°W	—	Late 16th century	The barn is timber framed with weatherboarding on a chamfered sandstone plinth, with the gable ends rebuilt in red brick, and a slate roof. There are five bays and half-bays at each end. The barn contains cart entrances, loft doors, and in the gable ends are arched owl holes.	II
Garden and terrace walls, Lea Hall; 52.78411°N 2.75324°W	—	Late 16th century (probable)	The terrace retaining wall is in red brick with chamfered grey sandstone coping. It has a U-shaped plan, and is about 120 metres (390 ft) long. The garden wall adjoins the hall to the northwest, and contains a segmental-headed doorway.	II
Manor Farmhouse; 52.77135°N 2.75367°W	—	Late 16th century (probable)	The farmhouse was remodelled and partly rebuilt in the late 19th century. It is timber framed with brick infill, it was partly underbuilt, rebuilt and extended in brick with some applied timber framing, and has a tile roof. The house consists of a hall range with one storey and an attic and two bays, and a cross-wing with two storeys and an attic and two bays. The windows are casements, some are mullioned and transomed, in the cross-wing is a square bay window and in the hall range are two gabled half-dormers. In the angle is a lean-to porch with a Tudor arch and a doorway with a rectangular fanlight.	II
Merrington Old Hall; 52.78367°N 2.78650°W	—	Late 16th century	The house was later remodelled and extended. It is timber framed with brick infill, it has been partly underbuilt and the front has been refaced or rebuilt in brick, and it has a tile roof. There are two storeys, four bays, and a rear wing. On the front is a dentilled eaves cornice, and the gables have bargeboards and finials. Some windows are casements, some are cross-windows, and there is a canted bay window.	II
Lea Hall; 52.78461°N 2.75348°W	—	1584	A small country house in red brick on a stone plinth, with sandstone dressings, quoins, and tile roofs with parapeted gables. There are two storeys, attics and a basement, and a U-shaped plan, consisting of a three-bays range and cross-wings. The porch has a hipped roof, and the doorway has a moulded architrave and a blocked fanlight. The windows are mixed; some are mullioned, some are also transomed, there are casement windows, cross-windows, and a gabled eaves dormer.	II*
Dovecote, Lea Hall; 52.78457°N 2.75429°W	—	c. 1584	The dovecote is in red brick with blue brick diapering on a sandstone plinth, with a dentil eaves cornice, and a pyramidal stone-slate roof with a small wooden glover that has a pyramidal lead cap and a weathervane. It contains a small window and a doorway with a red sandstone lintel. Inside there are about 300 nesting boxes.	II*
Stable, Lea Hall; 52.78454°N 2.75361°W	—	c. 1584	The stable is in red brick on a chamfered stone plinth, with diapering in blue brick, dressings in red and grey sandstone, quoins, and a parapeted gable end. There is one storey and a loft, and the stable contains doorway and windows of various types.	II
14 and 15 Grafton; 52.75966°N 2.83587°W	—	Late 16th or early 17th century	The cottage was altered in the 19th century and has been divided into two dwellings. It is timber framed with brick infill, it has been partly refaced or rebuilt in brick, and the roof is tiled. There is one storey and an attic, two bays, and flanking lean-tos. In the centre is a lean-to porch with segmental-headed entrances, the windows are casements with segmental heads, and there are three gabled dormers.	II
Albrighton Farmhouse; 52.75913°N 2.74701°W	—	Late 16th or 17th century	The farmhouse was later remodelled. It is timber framed, rendered, partly rebuilt in brick, and it has a tile roof. There are two storeys and an attic, and an H-shaped plan, consisting of a central hall range and flanking gabled cross-wings. The windows are mullioned and transomed, the gables are jettied, there are two gabled dormers, and in the angles are lean-to porches.	II
Garden wall adjoining Albright Hussey; 52.75345°N 2.73907°W	—	c. 1601	The wall is in red brick, on a chamfered plinth and with dressings in grey sandstone. It has a U-shaped plan and runs for about 10 metres (33 ft). The wall has quoins and a chamfered stone coping, and contains a chamfered Tudor arch. Adjoining it is a stone mounting block.	II
Garden wall southeast of Albright Hussey; 52.75342°N 2.73899°W	—	c. 1601	The wall is in red brick, on a plinth and with dressings in grey sandstone. It has an L-shaped plan, and contains a boarded door.	II
Grafton House; 52.76575°N 2.84468°W	—	Early to mid 17th century	A farmhouse, later a private house, it was extended in the 18th and 19th centuries. The earlier part is timber framed with red brick infill, the later parts are in red brick with a dentilled eaves cornice, and the roof has asbestos slates. There are two storeys and an attic, the original part has two bays, the extension of two bays to the south gives an L-shaped plan, and there is a two-storey rear wing. The windows are a mix of sashes, casements, and a cross-window.	II
Sundial; 52.77166°N 2.75452°W		1638	The sundial, converted from a churchyard cross, is in the churchyard of St Martin's Church, Preston Gubbals. It is in grey sandstone, with an octagonal plan, and consists of a chamfered base and two steps, a square baluster with a moulded base and top, a dated copper dial plate, and a gnomon. The sundial is also a Scheduled Monument.	II
Barn northeast of Fitz Manor; 52.75609°N 2.81715°W	—	17th century	The barn is timber framed with brick infill on a plinth of red brick, there is weatherboarding on the northwest gable, and a roof of corrugated iron. The barn has one storey, a loft and a basement, and two bays. Red sandstone steps lead up to a doorway on the southwest, there are also square openings, a loft entrance, and a former cartshed in the plinth.	II
Dovecote northwest of Fitz Manor; 52.75602°N 2.81857°W	—	17th century	The dovecote is in red brick on a chamfered plinth, with stone quoins and a pyramidal slate roof. It has an octagonal plan, and contains a doorway and windows.	II
Berwick Chapel; 52.72851°N 2.78154°W	—	1670	A private chapel, the tower and porch were added in about 1730–35, and there were further additions in 1892–94. The chapel is built in Grinshill sandstone with tile roofs, and consists of a nave, a south porch, transepts with west porches, a chancel, a northeast vestry, and a west tower. The tower has four stages, angle pilasters, a round-arched west doorway and windows, a cornice, a parapet with urns, and a pyramidal roof with a weathervane. The porch has a pair of unfluted Doric pilasters, sections of an entablature with a triglyph frieze, and a continuous moulded cornice.	II*
The Almshouses, forecourt and walls 52.72811°N 2.77904°W	—	1672	The almshouses are in red brick with moulded string courses and tile roofs with parapeted gable ends. They have one storey and attics and form three sides of a courtyard, the north range having eleven bays, and the east and west ranges with nine bays each. The windows are two-light casements, and there are gabled eaves dormers; the windows and doorways have segmental heads. Along the south is a red brick wall with sandstone coping. In the centre is a sandstone gateway with chamfered rustication, an elliptical archway with rusticated voussoirs, moulded imposts, a frieze a moulded cornice, and a large semicircular pediment with a coat of arms in the tympanum and a globe finial.	II*
Albrighton Hall; 52.75877°N 2.74782°W		c. 1675	A small country house, later a hotel, it was extended in 1885 and in about 1950. The building is in red brick with blue brick diapering and sandstone dressings on a plinth, with quois, a moulded string course, a moulded modillion eaves cornice, and a hipped tile floor. There are two storeys and an attic, a double-depth plan, a main block with six bays, and later extensions. The gabled porch has a Tudor archway, a moulded cornice and a parapet with a shield. The windows are mullioned and transomed, there are hipped and flat-roofed dormers, and on the front is a painted sundial with a gnomon.	II*
Garden wall, Albrighton Hall; 52.75872°N 2.74715°W	—	Late 17th century	The wall is in red brick with grey sandstone dressings on a chamfered stone plinth with stgepped chamfered stone coping. It is about 200 metres (660 ft) long, and has an L-shaped plan, running along the road, and turning at the north end to adjoin the hall. At the south end is a pier with chamfered rustication a moulded cornice, and a chamfered cap. In the north return is a gateway with brick gate piers, each with a chamfered stone plinth, a moulded stone cornice, and globe finial.	II
Gate piers, Albrighton Hall; 52.75850°N 2.74742°W		Late 17th century (probable)	The gate piers on the drive leading to the hall are in grey sandstone, and have a square section. Each pier has chamfered rustication, a moulded cornice, and a concave cap with a globe finial.	II
Keeper's Cottage; 52.73880°N 2.78487°W	—	Late 17th century	The cottage has been extended and used for other purposes. It is timber framed with brick infill on a brick plinth and has a tile roof. There is one storey and an attic, and two bays. The windows are casements and there are two gabled dormers.	II
Barn, Manor Farm; 52.77178°N 2.75266°W	—	Late 17th century	The barn is timber framed with weatherboarding on a chamfered red sandstone plinth, and has a slate roof. There are five bays, and the barn contains doorways and loft doors.	II
Leaton Hall Farmhouse; 52.76163°N 2.79035°W	—	1683	The farmhouse was later remodelled. The original part is timber framed with brick infill, this has been partly rebuilt and extended in red brick, and the roof is tiled. There are two storeys and an attic, and a T-shaped plan. The windows are a mix of sashes and cross-windows, with casements in the attic. Above the lower floor windows and the doorway are hood moulds.	II
Upper Berwick; 52.73826°N 2.78337°W	—	c. 1690	A small country house that was later extended. It is in red brick with sandstone dressings on a plinth, with chamfered quoins, a band, a moulded modillioned eaves cornice, and a hipped tile roof. There are two storeys, attics and a basement, and fronts of six and four bays. Above the middle two bays is a triangular pediment with an oculus in the tympanum. The porch has a frieze, a cornice, and a pedimented gable, and the doorway has a moulded architrave. The windows are sashes, and there are pairs of hipped dormers.	II*
Church of Saint Peter and Saint Paul, Fitz; 52.75535°N 2.81825°W		c. 1722	The south aisle was added in 1826–27, and the chancel was rebuilt and the south vestry was added in 1902–05 by Aston Webb. The church is built in red brick with sandstone dressings and quoins, the roof is tiled, and Aston Webb's additions are in Ruabon brick. The church consists of a nave, a south aisle, a chancel with a south organ chamber and vestry, and a west tower. The chancel has three stages, with floor bands, a moulded cornice, and a parapet with stone coping that is ramped up to the corners with tapered square obelisks. All the windows are round-headed.	II*
Berwick House; 52.72812°N 2.78548°W		1731	A country house that was altered and enlarged in 1878. It is in red brick on a rusticated plinth, with dressings in grey sandstone, a string course, moulded cornices, a balustrade with finials and swags, and hipped tile roofs. There are three storeys and a main front of nine bays. On the corners and the front are giant Corinthian pilasters. In the centre is a doorway with a moulded architrave, fluted Corinthian pilasters, an entablature with a frieze, and an open segmental pediment with carved decoration in the tympanum. In the northeast front is a two-storey porte-cochère.	II*
Gateway and wall of former dovecote, Berwick House; 52.72836°N 2.78479°W	—	c 1731	The remaining wall of the dovecote is in red brick with grey sandstone dressings on a chamfered plinth, with chamfered quoins, and part of a moulded cornice. There are two storeys and two bays, and at the rear are nesting boxes and ledges. The wall dates from about 1780, and is in sandstone on red brick, and has a triple-stepped plinth, a dentil cornice, and a finial. It contains a round archway with chamfered voussoirs, and a pair of wooden gates.	II
Stable block and farm buildings, Berwick House; 52.72888°N 2.78464°W	—	1730s	The buildings are in red brick with grey sandstone dressings and hipped tile roofs. They form a U-shaped plan, consisting of a coach house range with two storeys and an attic, and flanking ranges of one storey and an attic, with a wall along the south side. Above the three central bays of the coach house range is a triangular pediment with a clock in the tympanum, and a pavilion roof surmounted by a balustrade with urns. At the end of the left wing is a cottage with seven bays, and to its right are a cowshed and a granary.	II
Garden wall south of Albright Hussey; 52.75319°N 2.73916°W	—	18th century	The garden wall to the south of the house is in red brick with sandstone coping. It is about 70 metres (230 ft) long, stepped down to the south, and has raking buttresses to the east.	II
The Old House; 52.77331°N 2.81602°W	—	18th century	A timber framed house with brick infill, partly encased in rendered brick in the 19th century, and with a slate roof. There is one storey and an attic, two bays, and a lean-to at the rear. On the front is a gabled porch, the windows are casements, and there are two gabled eaves dormers.	II
The Old Rectory; 52.75524°N 2.81969°W	—	Mid 18th century	The rectory, later a private huse, is in red brick, partly on a stepped plinth, with a dentil eaves cornice and a slate roof with parapeted gables. There are two storeys and an attic, an L-shaped plan, a front of four bays, and infill in the angle. The third bay projects slightly, it has a gable, a Venetian window, and a stone Greek Doric doorcase with full columns and an entablature. The other windows are sashes, some of which are bowed.	II
1–6 Rosehill; 52.73641°N 2.77719°W	—	Mid to late 18th century	A row of cottages in red brick with tile roofs. They form a symmetrical composition consisting of a central range with two storeys and two bays, flanked by three-storey one-bay pavilions, flanked by one-storey three-bay ranges, and then two-storey two-bay pavilions. Most of the windows are cross-windows with segmental heads, and there are lunettes in the third storeys. The doorways have segmental heads, and most have gabled porches. Other features include bands and dentilled eaves cornices.	II
Fitz Farmhouse; 52.75563°N 2.81967°W	—	Mid to late 18th century	The farmhouse is in red brick with a dentil eaves cornice and a tile roof. There are three storeys and three bays, and a single-storey extension recessed on the left. The central doorway has a moulded architrave, a rectangular fanlight, and a gabled hood on brackets. The windows in the lower two floors are sashes with segmental heads, and in the top floor they are casements.	II
Lodges, gate, piers and railings, Berwick House; 52.72724°N 2.77226°W		Late 18th century	The lodges flank the entrance to the drive to Berwick house, and a storey was added to each in about 1878. They are in grey sandstone, each on a plinth with a moulded eaves cornice. They have pyramidal roofs, hipped at the rear, and each lodge has two storeys, a square plan, and rear extensions. On the front is a Tuscan porch with a frieze and a cornice, and the doorway has a moulded architrave. The windows are sashes, those facing the road in round-arched recesses. Between the lodges are cast iron vehicle and pedestrian gates, piers and railings.	II
Great Berwick Farmhouse; 52.73865°N 2.78815°W	—	Late 18th century	A red brick farmhouse with a tile roof and parapeted gable ends. There are two storeys, an attic and a basement, five bays, and a rear wing. The central doorway has a flat hood, the windows are cross-windows with segmental heads, there are two basement windows, and three gabled eaves dormers.	II
Home Farmhouse; 52.72891°N 2.78429°W	—	Late 18th century	The farmhouse is in red brick with a moulded eaves cornice and a tile roof. There are two storeys, an attic and a basement, a main block of three bays, and a two-storey extension to the right. The central doorway has a rectactular fanlight and a flat hood on shaped brackets, the windows in the main range are sashes, and in the extension they are casements.	II
Stable and coach house, Upper Berwick; 52.73820°N 2.78387°W	—	Late 18th century	The stable and coach house are in red brick with a tile roof, and two storeys. The stable block contains a doorway with a segmental head and windows, and there is an extension to the left with a cross-window and a stable door, both with segmental heads. The coach house to the right has a loft door and a depressed archway with double doors.	II
Eyecatcher, Berwick House; 52.72445°N 2.78090°W	—	Late 18th or early 19th century	The eyecatcher consists of the ruins of farm buildings in Gothic style. The buildings are in red sandstone, breccia and conglomerate, with dressings in red sandstone and red brick. Features include a gable towards the house with buttresses and narrow arched slits, stepped triple lancet windows, and an arched doorway.	II
Barn and horse engine house northwest of Fitz Manor; 52.75586°N 2.81842°W	—	Late 18th or early 19th century	The barn is timber framed with red brick infill, and it has a corrugated asbestos roof. It contains a cart entry, stable and loft doors, and ventilation holes. The horse engine house is to the northwest, and has a polygonal plan, red sandstone piers, and a hipped slate roof.	II
Yeaton Lodge; 52.76969°N 2.81155°W	—	1815	A house in red brick with a hipped slate roof, three storeys and an L-shaped plan. The front has three bays. Steps lead up to a central doorway with a moulded architrave, pilasters with incised Greek key ornament, a frieze, a moulded cornice, and a raised pediment. The windows are sashes, and in the left return is a full-height bow window.	II
Stable block, Yeaton Lodge; 52.76985°N 2.81178°W	—	c.1815	The stable block is in red brick with some red sandstone, a dentil eaves cornice, and a slate roof. There are two storeys and an L-shaped plan. The long range has doorways, some with segmental heads and some with fanlights, and the short range contains vents. At the southwest end is a three-storey tower with sash windows and a pyramidal roof with a weathervane.	II
Mytton Hall; 52.74948°N 2.82920°W	—	Early 19th century	A country house, enlarged in 1933, it is in rendered brick on a plinth, with a floor band, a moulded cornice, and a panelled parapet, raised over the middle bay. There are two and three storeys, a square plan, and a later wing to the northeast. The main block has fronts of three bays. In the centre is a grey sandstone Ionic porch with paired unfluted columns and a full entablature, and the doorway has side lights, incised pilasters, and a frieze and cornice on shallow consoles. The windows are sashes, and in the left return is a bow window and a doorway with quarter columns and an open triangular pediment. There is a semicircular porch in the angle with the later wing.	II
Milepost near North Lodge; 52.72906°N 2.77347°W	—	Early to mid 19th century	The milepost is on the northeast side of the B5067 road. It is in cast iron, and has a triangular section with a chamfered top. The milepost is inscribed on the top with the name of the ecclesiastical parish, on the left side with the distance in miles to "SALOP" (Shrewsbury) and the direction to the County Office, and on the other side with the distance to Baschurch, and the direction to the parish church.	II
Milepost near Crossgreen Farmhouse; 52.74332°N 2.77854°W	—	Early to mid 19th century	The milepost is on the east side of the B5067 road. It is in cast iron, and has a triangular section with a chamfered top. The milepost is inscribed on the top with the name of the ecclesiastical parish, on the left side with the distance in miles to "SALOP" (Shrewsbury) and the direction to the County Office, and on the other side with the distance to Baschurch, and the direction to the parish church.	II
Milepost near The Old Vicarage; 52.75732°N 2.78235°W	—	Early to mid 19th century	The milepost is on the northeast side of the B5067 road. It is in cast iron, and has a triangular section with a chamfered top. The milepost is inscribed on the top with the name of the ecclesiastical parish, on the left side with the distance in miles to "SALOP" (Shrewsbury) and the direction to the County Office, and on the other side with the distance to Baschurch, and the direction to the parish church.	II
Milepost near Medley Farmhouse; 52.76611°N 2.80103°W	—	Early to mid 19th century	The milepost is on the northeast side of the B5067 road. It is in cast iron, and has a triangular section with a chamfered top. The milepost is inscribed on the top with the name of the ecclesiastical parish, on the left side with the distance in miles to "SALOP" (Shrewsbury), and on the other side with the distance to Baschurch.	II
Milepost near the crossroads 52.77414°N 2.82067°W	—	Early to mid 19th century	The milepost is on the northeast side of the B5067 road. It is in cast iron, and has a triangular section with a chamfered top. The milepost is inscribed on the top with the name of the ecclesiastical parish, on the left side with the distance in miles to "SALOP" (Shrewsbury), and on the other side with the distance to Baschurch.	II
St John the Baptist's Church, Albright; 52.75743°N 2.74620°W		1840–41	The chancel was added later, followed by the vestry and organ chamber in 1906. The church is built in red sandstone with a tile roof, and it consists of a nave, a south porch, a chancel with a polygonal apse, all in Norman style with round-headed windows, and a north vestry and organ chamber in Early English style with lancet windows. Corbelled-out on the west gable is a recgtangular bellcote with a gable on each face and a wrought iron weathervane.	II
The Old Vicarage; 52.75988°N 2.78752°W		1857	The former vicarage was designed by S. Pountney Smith in Gothic Revival style. It is in red brick on a chamfered plinth, with grey sandstone dressings, quoins and a tile roof. There are two storeys and attics, and the house has a cruciform plan. Features include bay windows on the south and west fronts, an arcaded porch, parapeted gables with stone coping, dormers, and oriel windows.	II
Holy Trinity Church, Leaton; 52.76012°N 2.78786°W		1859	The church was designed by S. Pountney Smith, and the steeple was added in 1871. The church is built in Grinshill sandstone with tile roofs, and it consists of a nave, a south porch, a north aisle, a chancel with a south family pew, a north chapel, and a steeple at the northwest. On the west gable apex is a square bellcote with a spire. The steeple has a four-stage tower that has angle buttresses with gabled tops, a clock face, a corbelled and embattled parapet with gargoyles, square corner pinnacles with spirelets, and flying buttresses to the crocketed spire with lucarnes.	II
Gates and gate piers east of Berwick House; 52.72821°N 2.78412°W	—	c. 1878	The gates and gate piers are on the drive leading to the house. The gate piers are in red brick with grey sandstone caps. Each pier has a chamfered plinth, fluted pilaster strips, panels with aprons, a frieze, a moulded cornice, and a decorative urn finial. The southern pier contains a recess for a pedestrian gate. There are two wrought iron gates, one for vehicles, and the other for pedestrians, each with cresting.	II
Gates and gate piers southeast of Berwick House; 52.72797°N 2.78519°W	—	c. 1878	The gates and gate piers are at the northern entrance to the formal garden. The pair of gate piers are in grey sandstone and have a square section. Each pier has a moulded cornice, and a large carved iron finial. Between them is a pair of wrought iron gates with cresting in the centre.	II
Gates and gate piers southeast of Berwick House; 52.72772°N 2.78472°W	—	c. 1878	The gates and gate piers are at the southern entrance to the formal garden. The pair of gate piers are in grey sandstone and have a square section. Each pier has a moulded cornice, and a large carved iron finial. Between them is a pair of wrought iron gates with cresting in the centre.	II
Railings, gates and piers, Berwick House; 52.72807°N 2.78508°W	—	c. 1878	The pair of gate piers are in grey sandstone and have a square section. Each pier has chamfered rustication, a moulded cornice, and an urn finial. Between the piers is a pair of delicate wrought iron gates, and flanking them are delicate wrought iron railings.	II
Boat house, Albrighton Hall; 52.75855°N 2.74914°W	—	1885 (probable)	The boat house is in grey sandstone, and has a flat stone roof. On the lake side is a segmental arched opening, above which is a two-light opening with a mullion. On the shore side, steps with flanking stepped walls lead down to a doorway.	II
Yeaton Peverey; 52.76392°N 2.82760°W	—	1889–92	A country house by Aston Webb, it is in red sandstone on a chamfered plinth, there is some timber framing with plaster infill, it has moulded string courses, parapets that are pierced in places, obelisk finials, and a slate roof. There are two storeys and an attic, and a service wing with one storey and an attic. In the north front is a three-storey tower containing a round-arched entrance with a coat of arms above, and a frieze. On the right corner is a cupola with round arches and an ogee lead dome with a weathervane. Most of the windows are mullioned and transomed, there is a segmental bow window and a canted bay window.	II*
Walls, gates, gate piers and pavilions, Yeaton Peverey; 52.76441°N 2.82778°W	—	1890–92	The walls enclose the forecourt to the north of the house, they are in red sandstone forming a U-plan, and are about 100 metres (330 ft) long. In the centre of the north wall is a gateway with piers that have round-headed panels, balusters at the corners, moulded cornices, and are surmounted by statues. Between them is a pair of large gates flanked by smaller pedestrian gates, all in wrought iron. At the corners are square pavilions, each with one storey, a chamfered plinth, a cornice, a parapet, and a domed lead roof with a finial, and they contain mullioned windows.	II
Terrace retaining wall, Yeaton Peverey; 52.76387°N 2.82803°W	—	1890–92	The terrace retaining wall by Aston Webb is in red sandstone, and is about 70 metres (230 ft) long. It has a pierced parapet and globe finials, and has a bowed projection at the west end. There is a flight of stone steps at angles from it, with a stepped parapet at the front.	II
Peverey House Cottage; 52.76448°N 2.82647°W	—	1892	A lodge to Yeaton Peverley designed by Aston Webb, it has a ground floor in sandstone, a timber framed upper floor with plaster infill, and a slate roof. There are two storeys and a T-shaped plan. The gable ends are jettied, and the gables have moulded bargeboards with pierced pendants. The doorway has a moulded elliptical arch and a hood mould, and above it is a datestone. The windows are mullioned with casements, and there is an oriel window.	II
Shrewsbury Lodge; 52.76835°N 2.82877°W		c. 1892	The lodge at the entrance to the drive to Yeaton Peverey was designed by Aston Webb. It is in red sandstone with some timber framing in the upper floor, and a slate roof. There are two storeys and an L-shaped plan. The timber-framed part has a moulded eaves cornice, and a jettied gable with moulded bargeboards and a finial. On the front is a full-height canted stone bay window, with a string course, a moulded cornice, and an embattled parapet. The doorway has an elliptical arch and a hood mould, and the windows are casements, some with mullions.	II
Gates, piers and walls, Shrewsbury Lodge; 52.76844°N 2.82857°W	—	c. 1892	The walls, gates and gate piers were designed by Aston Webb. The walls and piers are in red sandstone on plinths. Each of the main gate piers has projections with scrolled tops, a frieze, a moulded cornice and cap, and a globe finial. Between them are large ornamental wrought iron gates with cresting. To the west is a pedestrian gateway with a plain pier that has a domed top, and a wrought iron gate with an elaborate overthrow. The walls have plain balustrading, ramped coping, and end piers with domed caps.	II
Leaton War Memorial; 52.76256°N 2.79617°W		1920–21	The war memorial stands near a road junction, it is in Horton stone, and its design is based on the Cross of Sacrifice. The memorial consists of a Latin cross on which is a metal sword. The cross stands on an octagonal plinth on a base of three steps. The plinth has an inscription of those lost in the First World War, and of those who returned from the conflict.	II
