= Fitz, Shropshire =

Village in Shropshire, England

Coordinates: 52.755°N 2.818°W

Fitz
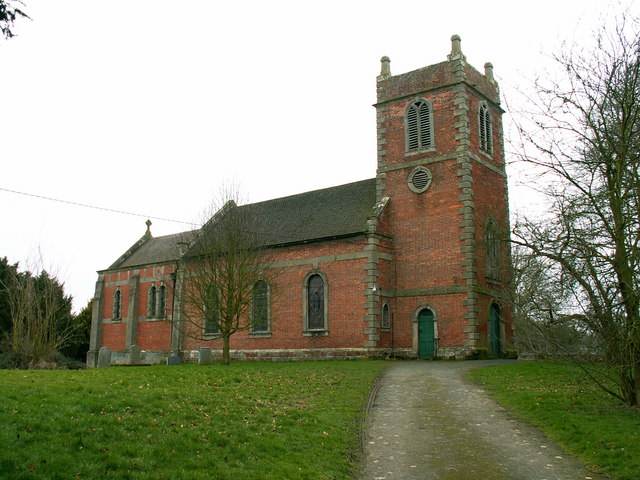
- Church of St Peter and St Paul

- Location within Shropshire
- OS grid reference: SJ447178
- Civil parish: Bomere Heath and District
- Unitary authority: Shropshire
- Ceremonial county: Shropshire
- Region: West Midlands
- Country: England
- Sovereign state: United Kingdom
- Post town: Shrewsbury
- Postcode district: SY4
- Dialling code: 01743
- Police: West Mercia
- Fire: Shropshire
- Ambulance: West Midlands
- UK Parliament: Shrewsbury and Atcham

Fitz is a village in the civil parish of Bomere Heath and District, in Shropshire, England. It is close to the River Severn, downstream from Montford Bridge and upstream of Shelton, near Shrewsbury. In 1931 the parish had a population of 241. On 1 April 1934 the parish was abolished to form Pimhill, part also went to Montford.

Fitz has a red-brick church named for Saint Peter and Saint Paul, built in 1722 and restored in 1915 by Sir Aston Webb. Eighteenth-century mathematician Edward Waring is buried in the churchyard.

Fitz Manor, which dates at the oldest to about 1450, is run as a bed-and-breakfast establishment and is a grade II listed building.

== See also ==
- Listed buildings in Pimhill
