= Bomere Heath and District =

Civil parish in Shropshire, England

Coordinates: 52.764°N 2.778°W

Pimhill
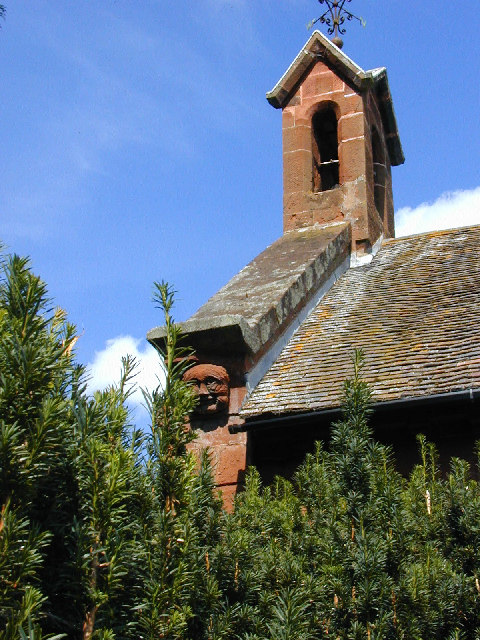
- St John's Church, Albrighton

- Location within Shropshire
- Population: 2,118 (2011)
- OS grid reference: SJ4477917898
- Civil parish: Bomere Heath and District
- Unitary authority: Shropshire
- Ceremonial county: Shropshire
- Region: West Midlands
- Country: England
- Sovereign state: United Kingdom
- Post town: Shrewsbury
- Postcode district: SY4
- Dialling code: 01743
- Police: West Mercia
- Fire: Shropshire
- Ambulance: West Midlands
- UK Parliament: Shrewsbury and Atcham

Bomere Heath and District is a geographically large civil parish in Shropshire, England, to the north of Shrewsbury. It was formerly called Pimhill, named after a hill, which rises to 163 m, sometimes spelt Pim Hill.

As well as the large village of Bomere Heath, the small villages of Albrighton, Fitz, Leaton, Merrington and Preston Gubbals, as well as the hamlets of Crossgreen, Dunnsheath, Forton Heath, Grafton and Mytton. Old Woods and Walford Heath were in the parish but are now in Baschurch.

The 2001 census recorded 2008 people living in the parish, in 853 households, the population increasing to 2,118 at the 2011 Census.

Near Pim Hill is Lea Hall, a notable Elizabethan brick house and dovecote.

The Battle of Shrewsbury (1403) was fought in the eastern part of the parish, near the present settlement of Battlefield, though much of the battlefield now lies in the parish of Shrewsbury.

The River Severn forms the parish boundary to the south, whilst the River Perry flows through the south-western area of the parish. The parish has numerous woodlands and coppices, making it quite a wooded area overall.

On the hill itself is a stone carving of a naked woman which has been dubbed by some as the "Rock Lady". Its origin is as yet unknown. Its earliest sighting on record is 1993 but it is thought to date much further back this.

== Local governance ==
The parish is sub-divided into 5 wards for the purpose of electing the parish council. The wards are: Albrighton (1 councillor), Bomere Heath (6 councillors), Fitz (2 councillors), Leaton (2 councillors) and Preston Gubbals (2 councillors). The parish council therefore consists of a total of 13 members. The elections to the parish council were held in 2017.

Since 2009 the parish forms part of the Shropshire Council electoral division of "Tern".

== See also ==
- Listed buildings in Bomere Heath and District
