= Leaton =

Village in Shropshire, England

Coordinates: 52.761°N 2.790°W

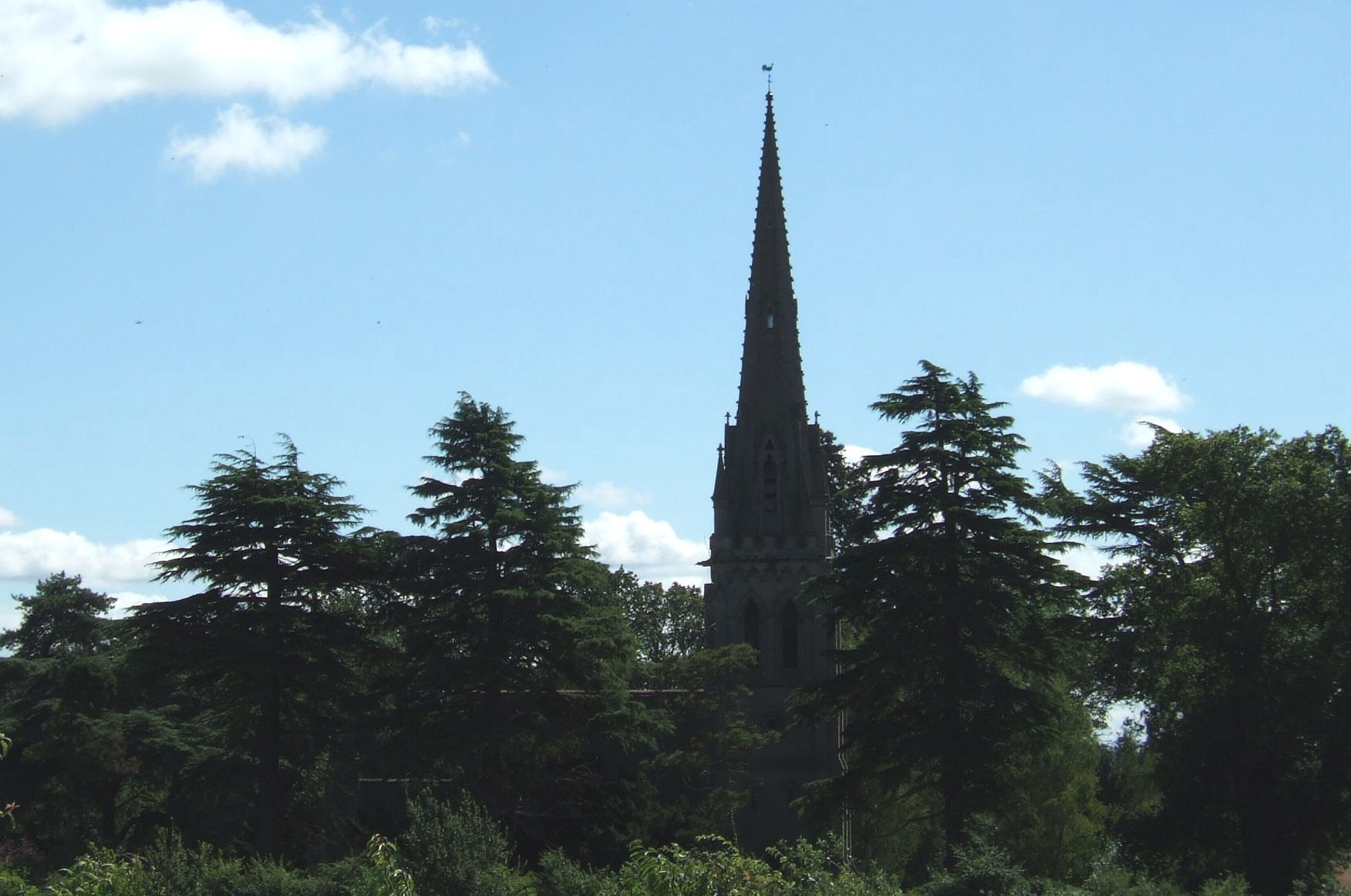
- Holy Trinity church, viewed from the north

- Location within Shropshire
- OS grid reference: SJ466184
- Civil parish: Bomere Heath and District
- Unitary authority: Shropshire
- Ceremonial county: Shropshire
- Region: West Midlands
- Country: England
- Sovereign state: United Kingdom
- Post town: SHREWSBURY
- Postcode district: SY4
- Dialling code: 01743
- Police: West Mercia
- Fire: Shropshire
- Ambulance: West Midlands
- UK Parliament: Shrewsbury

Leaton is a small village in the civil parish of Bomere Heath and District, in Shropshire, England. It lies on the B5067 Shrewsbury to Baschurch road.

The parish church, dedicated to Holy Trinity, was built in 1859, with the tower added in 1872 by Shrewsbury architect Samuel Pountney Smith. The churchyard contains the war graves of a King's Shropshire Light Infantry soldier of World War I and an RAF officer of World War II. Horace Lambart, 11th Earl of Cavan, ultimately Archdeacon of Salop, was vicar of Leaton from 1908 to 1913.

The Shrewsbury to Chester Line runs through, though the nearest railway station is at Shrewsbury, as the former Leaton railway station closed to passengers in 1960. The signal box went in 1988, but today there remains a level crossing. A small industrial estate now occupies the site of the railway sidings.

There once existed the Leaton Brick and Pipe Works, one of a number of clay-based industries in the area.

North of the village at the junction with the road to Montford Bridge is a war memorial cross on a nonagonal plinth listing local men who died serving in the First World War and those who served and returned from the war.

Just to the south of Leaton is the hamlet of Dunnsheath.

== See also ==
- Listed buildings in Bomere Heath and District
