= John Carline =

English bridge-builder

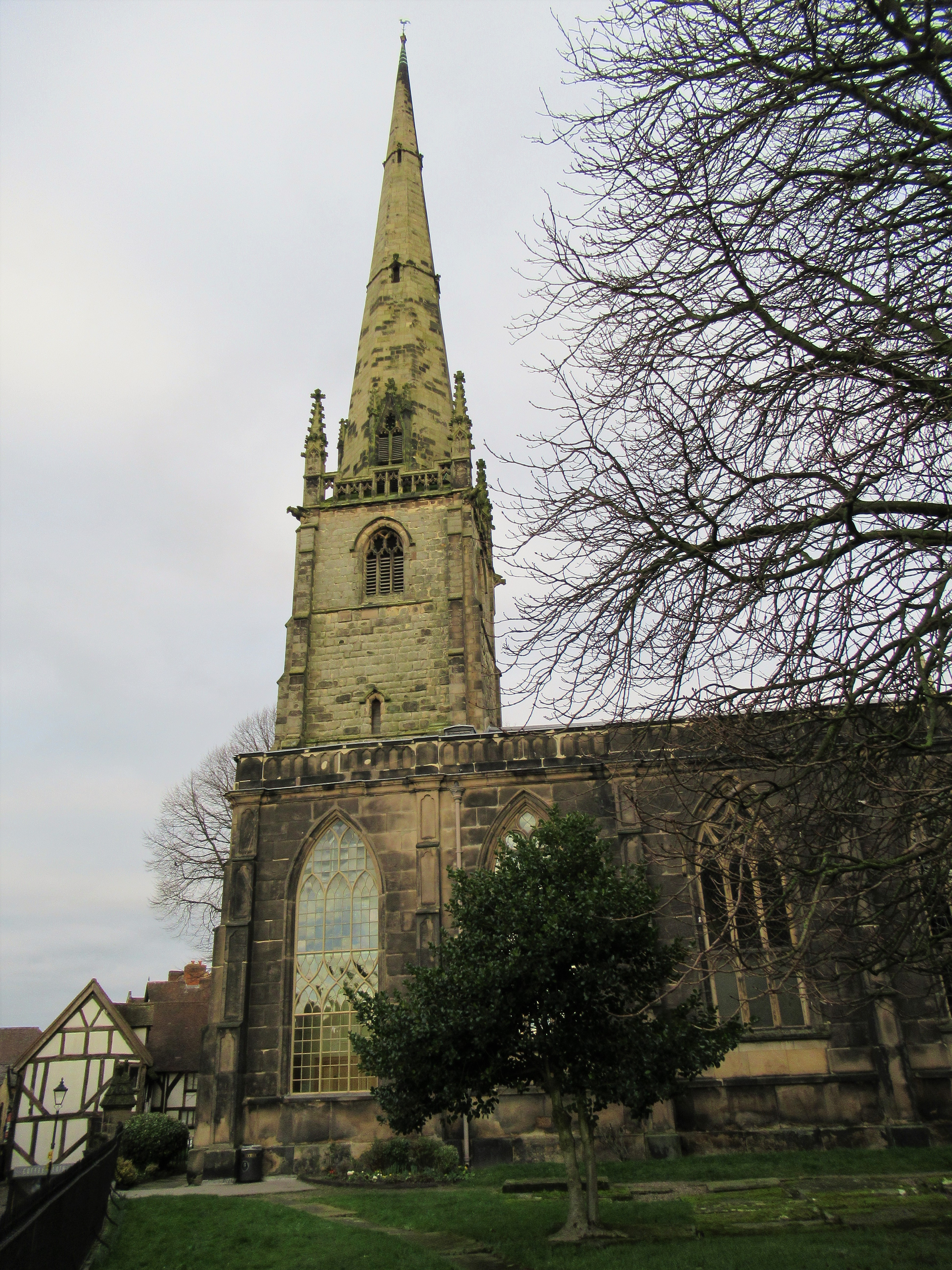
St Alkmund's in Shrewsbury

John Carline (1730–2 March 1793) was an 18th-century English bridge-builder. Both his son (1758-1834) and grandson (1792-1862) continued the name - the former focussing on churches and church monuments but also building bridges.

== Life ==
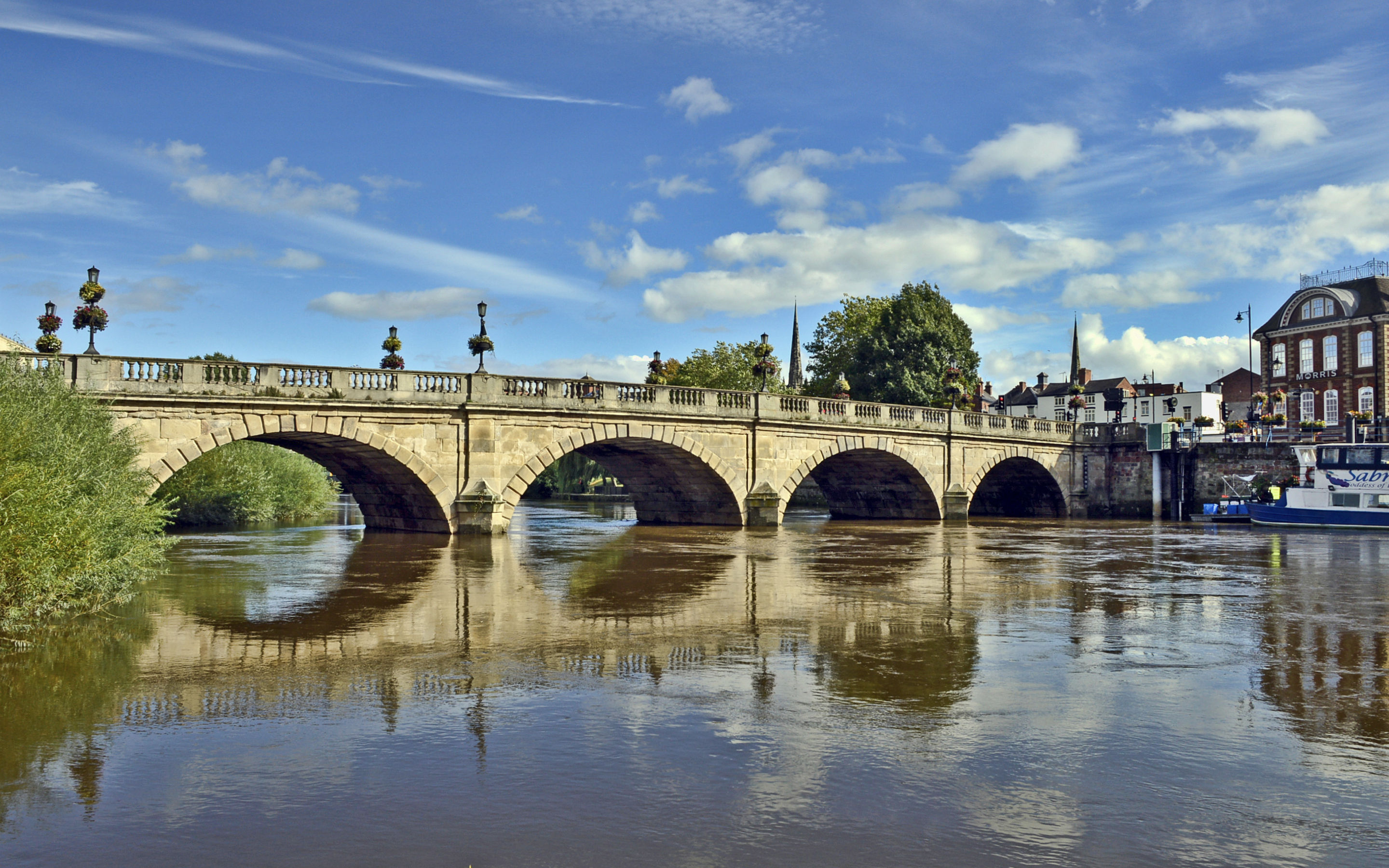
The Welsh Bridge in Shrewsbury

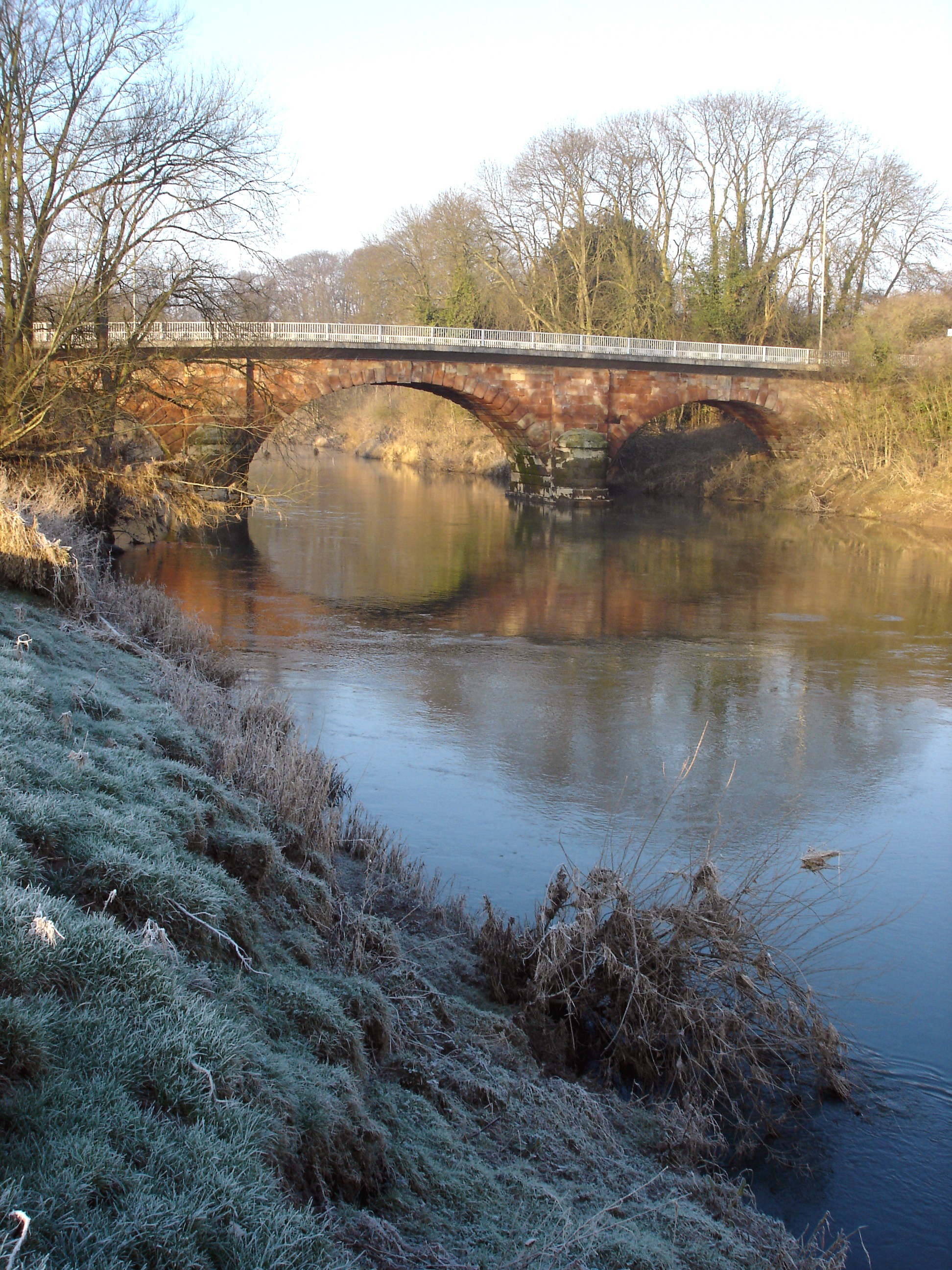
Montford Bridge

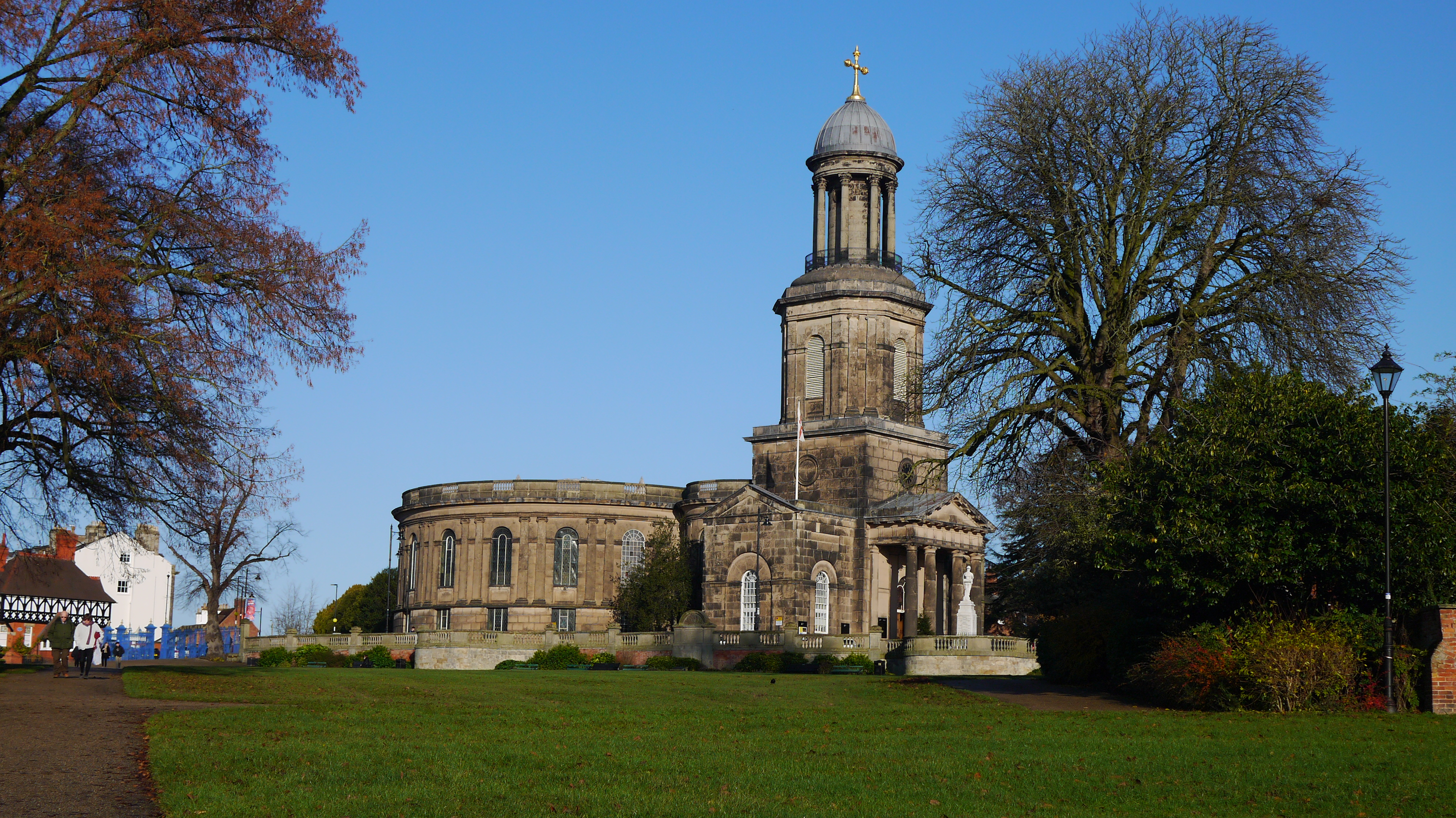
St Chad's in Shrewsbury

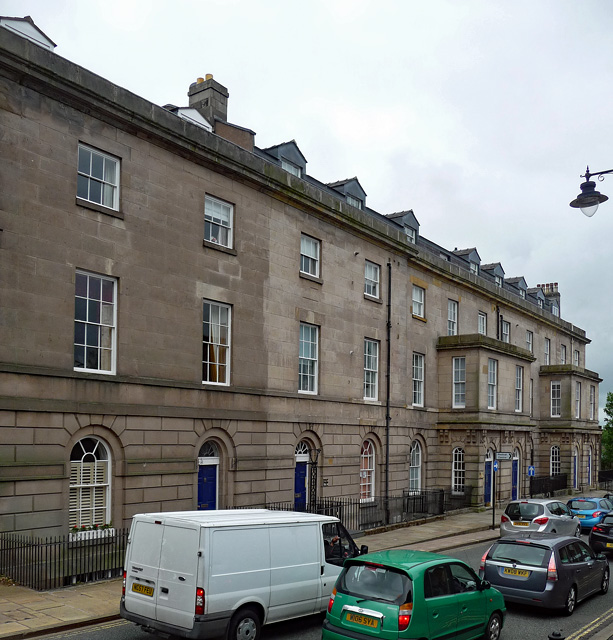
The Claremont Buildings in Shrewsbury

He was born at Carline Place in Lincoln in 1730. He trained as a stonemason and around 1765 he went into partnership with a John Tilly or Tilley in Shrewsbury and together they built several bridges. In Shrewsbury he lived in a large self-built house at Abbey Foregate.

In 1771 they built the arched stone bridge at Coleham Head over the Rea Brook. Finding a quantity of potential work he bought an area of open land in Shrewsbury to use as a mason's yard and this became known as Carline's Field. In 1774 they built the five arch English Bridge in Shrewsbury. In 1788 they built a new entrance portico for Adderley Hall.

In 1788 he won a contract for a new jail and workhouse in Shrewsbury.

In 1790 they built the three arch Montford Bridge over the River Severn under a commission from Thomas Telford completing this in 1794.

In 1790 they built the magnificent St Alkmund's Church in Shrewsbury - still a major landmark with its tall stone spire. At the same time they built a fine row of Georgian houses known as the Claremont Buildings. By this stage a great deal of the work was being done by his son, who added an artistic flair.

He died on 2 March 1793 back in Lincoln.

== John Carline (son) ==
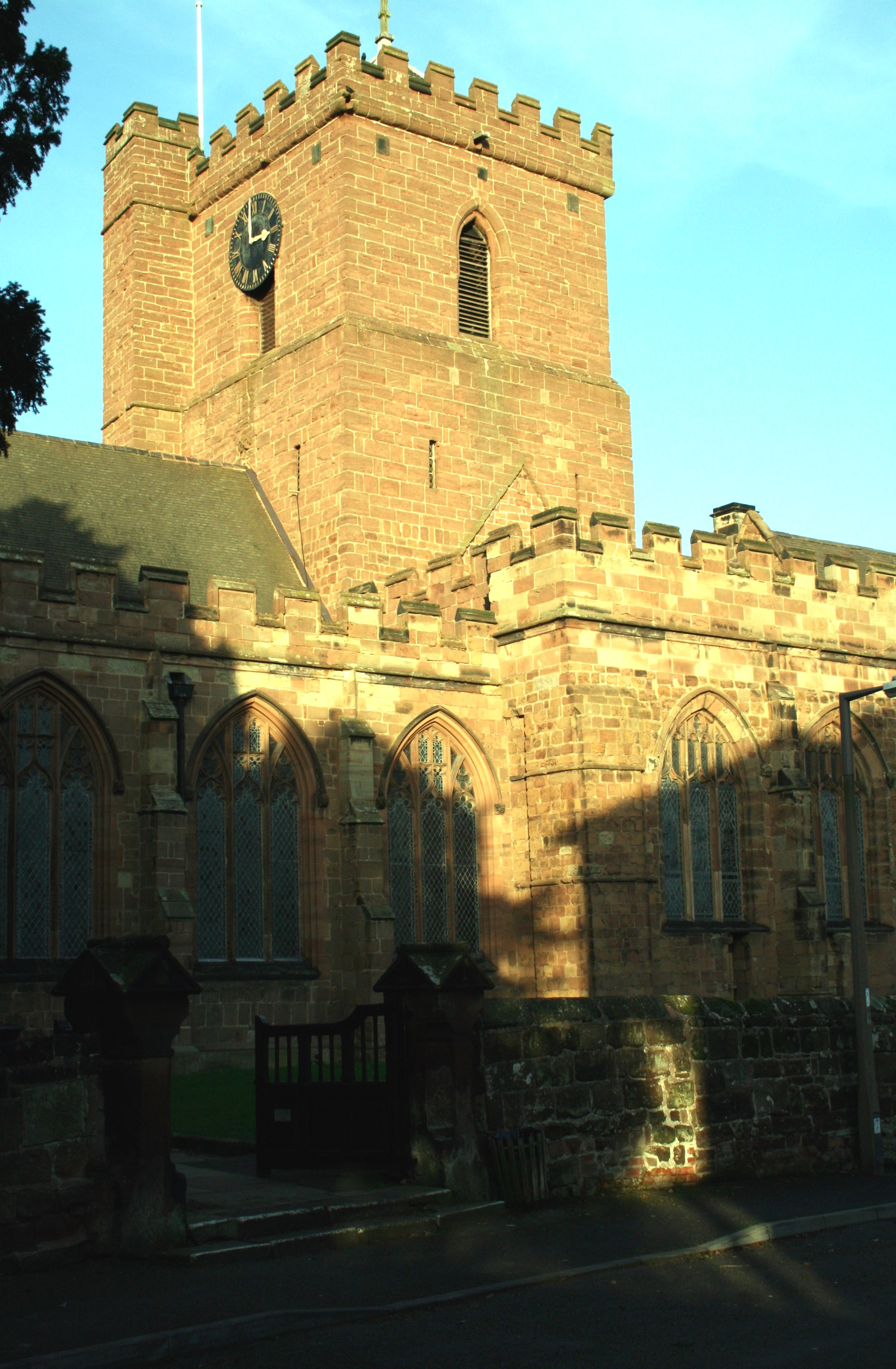
St Andrew's Church, Shifnal

John Carline the second was born in Lincoln on 6 May 1758 the son of John Carline and Anne Hayward. He was trained as a stonemason by his father, but showed greater skill in terms of sculpture. He moved with his father to Shrewsbury in 1765. Around 1788 he appears to have set up on his own, specialising in churches and church memorials. He continued to work with John Tilley after his father died until Tilley himself died in 1795. From 1801 to 1803 he was briefly in partnership with Henry Linnell before bringing his own son in to create J & J Carline.

He died in Shrewsbury on 8 December 1834 aged 76.

=== Works ===
- Carvings on the Shirehall in Shrewsbury (1785)
- Tomb of Francis Cunliffe in Llanyblodwell (1789)
- Tomb of Catherine Baldwyn in Kinlet (1790)
- Tomb of Hester Bright in North Lydbury (1791)
- St Chad's Church, Shrewsbury (1790-1792)
- The Welsh Bridge in Shrewsbury (1790-1795) based on his father's English Bridge.
- Spire of St Alkmund's Church in Shrewsbury (1792-1794)
- Completion of Montford Bridge (1792-1795)
- Tomb of R W Lloyd in Oswestry (1794)
- Temporary wooden bridge at Meole Brace (1801)
- Tomb of William Kinaston in Ruyton (1806)
- Tomb of Robert Laurence in St Julian's Church, Shrewsbury (1806)
- St Andrews Church in Shifnal (1808) as "architect"
- Tomb of Sir Richard Hill in Hodnet (1808)
- Tomb of Lucy Minor in Shawbury (1808)
- Tomb of Richard Phillips in St Martin's, Shropshire (1810)
- Tomb of John Oakley in Bishops Castle (1811)
- House in Shadwell for William Botfield (1812)
- Tomb of Mary Corbet in Moreton Corbet (1813)
- tomb of Stephen Leake in Chester Cathedral (1813)
- Tomb of Maurice Lloyd in Llanfair Caereinion (1813)
- Tomb of John Hill in Hodnet (1814)
- Tomb of Charles Groby in Market Drayton (1814)
- Memorial to John Simpson in St Chad's Church, Shrewsbury (1815)
- Tomb of John Corbet in Battlefield, Shropshire (1817)
- Monument to Edward Poore in Salisbury Cathedral (1817)
- Four lions at base of Lord Hill's Column in Abbey Foregate, Shrewsbury (1817)
- Rebuilding the bridge at Cound (1818)
- Rebuilding of Manor Lane Bridge in Halesowen (1818)
- Pell Wall House near Market Drayton (1822-1828) with his son
- Major rebuilding of St Michael's Church in Shrewsbury (1829-1830)

== John Carline (grandson) ==
Born in Shrewsbury in 1792 the son of John Carline and Mary Cotton, he became a Freeman of the Company of Masons in 1817. He exhibited at the Royal Academy from 1825. From 1820 he took over the majority of the work in his father's firm. He did little work after 1840 and no known work after 1844 possibly indicating an injury or infirmity.

He retired to Skellingthorpe in or before 1853 and died in 1862 in Lincoln.

The house at Abbey Foregate was thereafter inhabited by a Richard Carline.

=== Works ===
- Tomb of Elizabeth Clive (granddaughter of Clive of India) in Moreton Say (1822)
- Tomb of Sir Corbet Corbet in Adderley (1823)
- Tomb of William Childe in Kinlet (1824)
- tomb of Joseph South in Wellington, Herefordshire (1827)
- Memorial to Rev J B Blakeway in St Mary's Church, Shrewsbury (1828)
- Tomb of Baron Forester in Willey, Shropshire (1828)
- Tomb of Sir Thomas Jones in St Alkmund's in Shrewsbury (1829)
- Tomb of Mary Heber at Hodnet (1834)
- Grinshill Church (1839)
- Shrewsbury House of Industry (1840) as "architect"
- Tomb with bust to William Hazledine in St Chad's Church in Shrewsbury (1841)
- Tomb of Rev John Basnett in Baschurch (1844)

== Thomas Carline (grandson) ==
Born in Shrewsbury in 1799 the second son of John Carline and Mary Cotton he had more formal education but less success. He attended the Royal Academy Schools in London in 1821. He exhibited at the Royal Academy 1825 to 1828 but only had one public work of note: the panels on the monument to Sir John Hill in Prees (1826).

He trained at least three other sculptors: John Hall, John Mucklestone and William Burr.

He died in 1868.

== Recognition ==
Carline Crescent in Shrewsbury and Carline Place and Carline Road in Lincoln are named after the family.
