= Albrighton, Bomere Heath and District =

Village in Shropshire, England

Coordinates: 52.760°N 2.747°W

Albrighton
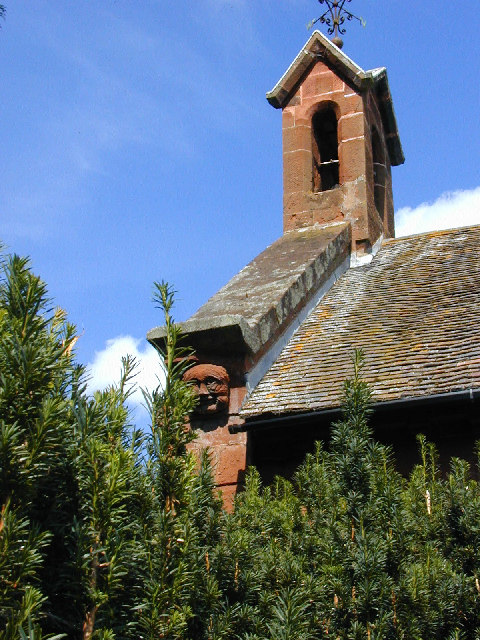
- St John's Church, Albrighton

- Location within Shropshire
- Population: c.273
- OS grid reference: SJ495183
- Civil parish: Bomere Heath and District
- Unitary authority: Shropshire
- Ceremonial county: Shropshire
- Region: West Midlands
- Country: England
- Sovereign state: United Kingdom
- Post town: SHREWSBURY
- Postcode district: SY4
- Dialling code: 01939
- Police: West Mercia
- Fire: Shropshire
- Ambulance: West Midlands
- UK Parliament: Shrewsbury

Albrighton is a small village in the civil parish of Bomere Heath and District, in Shropshire, England. It is situated on the A528 Shrewsbury-Ellesmere road and is roughly 4.0 miles (6.4 km) north of Shrewsbury. After a history of being its own parish, it currently lies in the parish of "Bomere Heath and District", formerly called "Pimhill". According to the 2001 United Kingdom census, the parish population of Pimhill was 2008, with the number of these inhabiting in Albrighton being 273.

It is first mentioned in the Domesday Book of 1086, as Etbritone ("Ēadbeorht's settlement"). Albright Hussey was once part of the same manor, and indeed shared the same name originally.

== History ==
Until 1886, Albrighton was traditionally a chapelry in the parish of Shrewsbury St. Mary, because of the close proximity, along with other small local villages Wollascott and Leaton. As well as being in the Hundred of Pimhill, Albrighton used to be its own parish. Albrighton civil parish succeeded its status as a chapelry, after being created in 1866. Over time, the parish would vary in size, and in April 1934 after the Salop Review Order, there were major boundary changes around Shropshire, with Albrighton being enlarged by 965 acres by the abolition of Battlefield and Shrewsbury St. Alkmund. However the parish became abolished on 1 April 1967, just over a hundred years since its creation. The abolition of Albrighton was to enlarge the current administrative parishes of Pimhill and Astley after The Salop (No.2) Order, 1966. After this, Albrighton became part of the parish of Pimhill, now called "Bomere Heath and District".

The church in the village is dedicated to St. John the Baptist, and is a stone building in the early Norman style. According to The Church of England, the present building was built in 1840 and opened for the first time a year later. It is described by John Marius Wilson, the Imperial Gazetteer of England and Wales as "a very good church." Stylistically it has been described as "only a copy of Norman architecture, but it has a real Norman font". In contemporary society it hosts regular events.

Albrighton's earliest population figures date back to the late 19th century, when in 1881 the population stood at 102. After turn of the century the population began to decline, with figures reaching as little as 77 in 1931. However, after this there was a sharp increase in the population with the 1961 census showing 248. This is supported by the number of houses being built after 1930, with the increase being more than threefold. One reason for this might be because of the council houses being built in Shrewsbury in between the wars, as part of the 1930s slum clearance.

=== Registers ===
The Albrighton Registers can tell us a lot about the village's history as they record all information such as baptisms and burials in St Mary's Church, Shrewsbury. They date back to 1563, but despite this the earliest volume has been lost. The first existing volume was likely to have begun in 1666, by William Hughes, who aimed to keep baptisms and burials separate, but this was soon given up. It lasted all the way until 1790, however even this is in a bad condition, with many pages being torn. A much shorter second volume also exists, but this ends in 1812. The transcripts of the registers are all now preserved in St. Mary's church.

=== Occupation ===
A pie chart to show the male occupation in Albrighton in 1831

In the past, Shropshire's economy was fuelled by agricultural activities, and the area of Pimhill Hundred was no different.

Traditionally, Pimhill was very agricultural, with 1831 census data showing that over half the male population worked in this industry. The pie chart positioned to the left shows how male occupation in Pimhill was divided in 1831. The retail and handcraft industry made up a quarter of the occupation.

Albrighton's earliest occupational data dates back to the late 19th century, with the 1881 census providing information. The occupational data from this time shows many of the males being engaged in agriculture, which reflects the same as the earlier information obtained about Pimhill. Also, the figures show that females were mainly engaged in domestic services or office jobs.

== Geography ==
=== Population ===
A line graph showing the population in Albrighton between 1881 and 1961

Total number of houses in Albrighton between 1881 and 1961

The population of Albrighton never showed any major fluctuations at the turn of the nineteenth century to the twentieth. The first major increase was recorded in the 1951 census, when the population had tripled from the previous census, undertaken before World War II. The total number of houses in Albrighton is shown in the adjacent table, and this also shows a great increase to coincide with the rising population. Nationally the whole population rose during this time because of the post war baby boom. However, the increase is explained by a great increase in housing production in Shropshire in the 1930s, and with the majority of Shropshire not being bombed in World War II the housing production could increase. With the population of Albrighton in 2001, being 273, the population has only risen by 25 people since the 1961 census, which could be a result of improved life expectancy.

=== Governance ===
As Albrighton lies in the civil parish of "Bomere Heath and District", it is part of the Shrewsbury Parliamentary constituency. In the 2024 elections Julia Buckley gained the seat as a Labour Member of Parliament. Furthermore, in "Bomere Heath and District" there are also local parish council elections for thirteen councillors, where Albrighton has one councillor.

=== Climate ===
The nearest weather station to Albrighton is located in Shawbury, which is the main weather station for the whole of Shropshire. This is just over six miles away from Albrighton in a North-Easterly direction. The climate for Shropshire is very similar throughout, where locally the coldest nights around Shawbury fall to −9.6c. With Albrighton being a village, temperatures could be lower than the average. Furthermore, the average rainfall in a year is expected to reach around 65 cm, however, despite this Shropshire in 2012 has been declared a drought zone with the worst water shortage since 1976.

Climate data for Albrighton, Shrewsbury, Shropshire
Month	Jan	Feb	Mar	Apr	May	Jun	Jul	Aug	Sep	Oct	Nov	Dec	Year
Mean daily maximum °C (°F)	7 (45)	7 (45)	10 (50)	12 (54)	16 (61)	19 (66)	21 (70)	21 (70)	18 (64)	14 (57)	10 (50)	7 (45)	14 (56)
Mean daily minimum °C (°F)	0 (32)	0 (32)	1 (34)	2 (36)	5 (41)	8 (46)	10 (50)	10 (50)	7 (45)	4 (39)	2 (36)	1 (34)	4 (40)
Average precipitation cm (inches)	5.48 (2.16)	4.11 (1.62)	4.53 (1.78)	4.64 (1.83)	5.42 (2.13)	5.43 (2.14)	5.18 (2.04)	5.69 (2.24)	5.88 (2.31)	6.18 (2.43)	6.08 (2.39)	6.10 (2.40)	64.72 (25.47)
Source: Bing.com

=== Transport ===
As well as being located close to the county town of Shropshire, Albrighton is just under 50 miles away from Birmingham, the closest major city, and is located just over 150 miles north-west to the capital city of London. The closest train station to Albrighton is Shrewsbury railway station, which has direct links to many places, including Manchester, Wrexham, Crewe and London via Birmingham.

Albrighton is located on the A528 Shrewsbury-Ellesmere road. There is a bus stop in the village opposite the Albrighton Hall Hotel, with an infrequent service to Shrewsbury and Ellesmere provided by Lakeside Coaches.

== Local Amenities ==
- Mercure Shrewsbury Albrighton Hall Hotel & Spa, located 0.3 miles away from the main village, is a 300-year-old mansion, with a spectacular ornamental lake.
- Albright Hussey Manor, is located 1.1miles away from Albrighton. Albright Hussey was once part of the same manor. With 26 modern hotel rooms, it is the highest four star ranked hotel in Shropshire.

== See also ==
- Listed buildings in Bomere Heath and District
