= Montford, Shropshire =

Village in Shropshire, England

Coordinates: 52.728°N 2.862°W

Montford
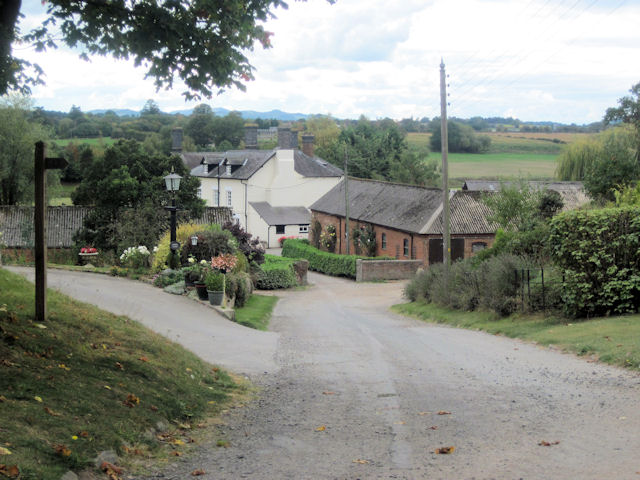
- The small village of Montford, Shropshire

- Location within Shropshire
- OS grid reference: SJ417148
- Civil parish: Montford
- Unitary authority: Shropshire
- Ceremonial county: Shropshire
- Region: West Midlands
- Country: England
- Sovereign state: United Kingdom
- Post town: SHREWSBURY
- Postcode district: SY4
- Dialling code: 01743
- Police: West Mercia
- Fire: Shropshire
- Ambulance: West Midlands
- UK Parliament: Shrewsbury and Atcham

Montford is a small village and parish in Shropshire, England.

The village lies near the A5 road, on the north bank of the River Severn and is 3 miles north-west of the town of Shrewsbury.

At the parish church of St Chad, Robert Waring Darwin, the father of the naturalist Charles Darwin, and Susannah Darwin, his mother, are buried in the churchyard, as is Charles' sister Susan. Indoors are two parish war memorials, a marble tablet commemorating the First World War dead, and a three-light east window commemorating those of the Second World War.

The parish includes the larger villages of Montford Bridge and Shrawardine.

Charles Bromby, former Anglican Bishop of Tasmania, was Vicar of Montford from 1882 to 1887.

== See also ==
- Listed buildings in Montford, Shropshire
- Ford (crossing)
