= Montford Bridge =

Village and bridge in Shropshire, England

Coordinates: 52.732°N 2.842°W

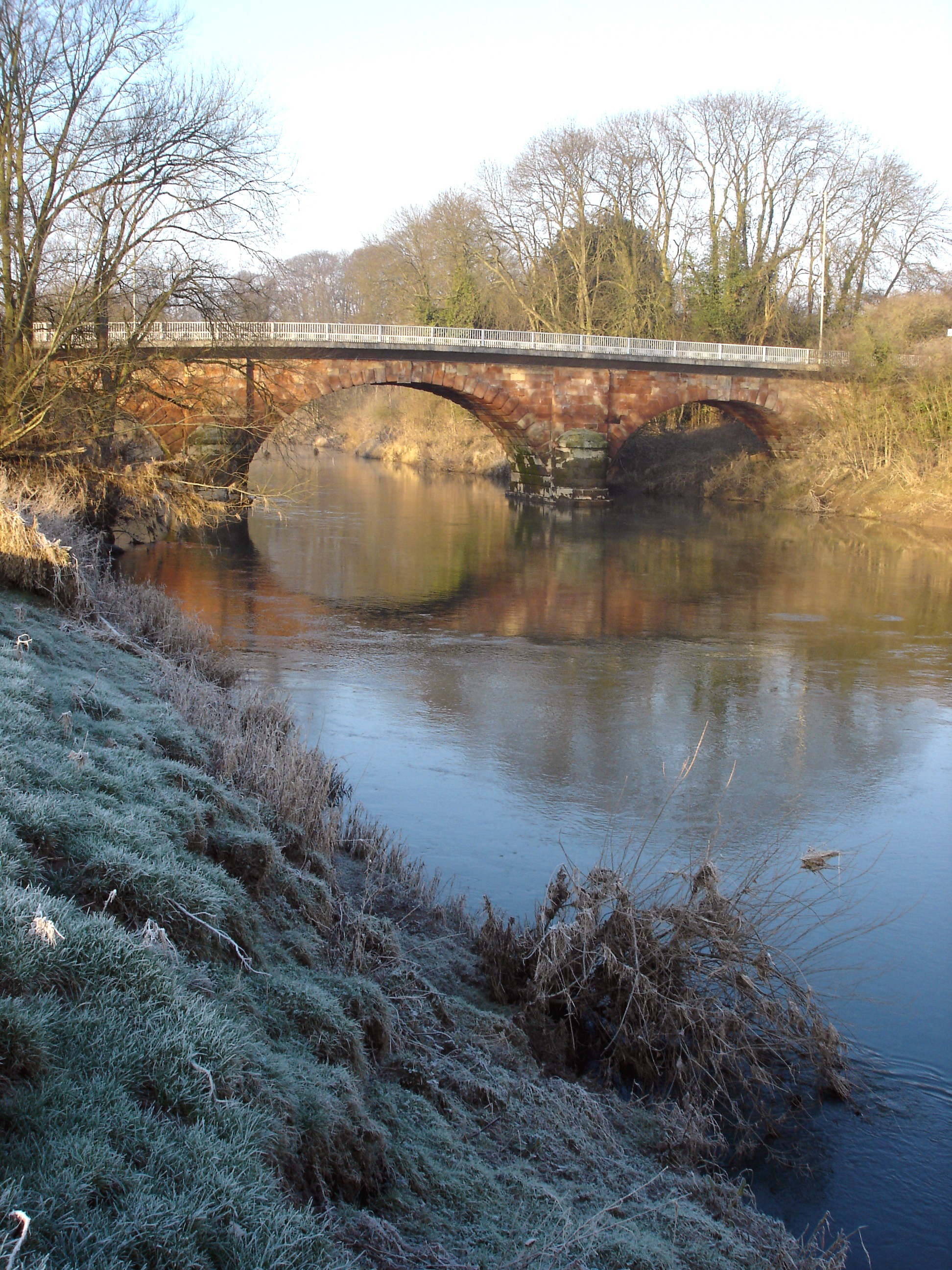
- Montford Bridge

- Location within Shropshire
- OS grid reference: SJ431152
- Civil parish: Montford
- Unitary authority: Shropshire
- Ceremonial county: Shropshire
- Region: West Midlands
- Country: England
- Sovereign state: United Kingdom
- Post town: SHREWSBURY
- Postcode district: SY4
- Dialling code: 01743
- Police: West Mercia
- Fire: Shropshire
- Ambulance: West Midlands
- UK Parliament: Shrewsbury and Atcham

Montford Bridge is a village and bridge. The village is in Shropshire, England, UK. The bridge is in that village. It lies on the River Severn and is close to the town of Shrewsbury.

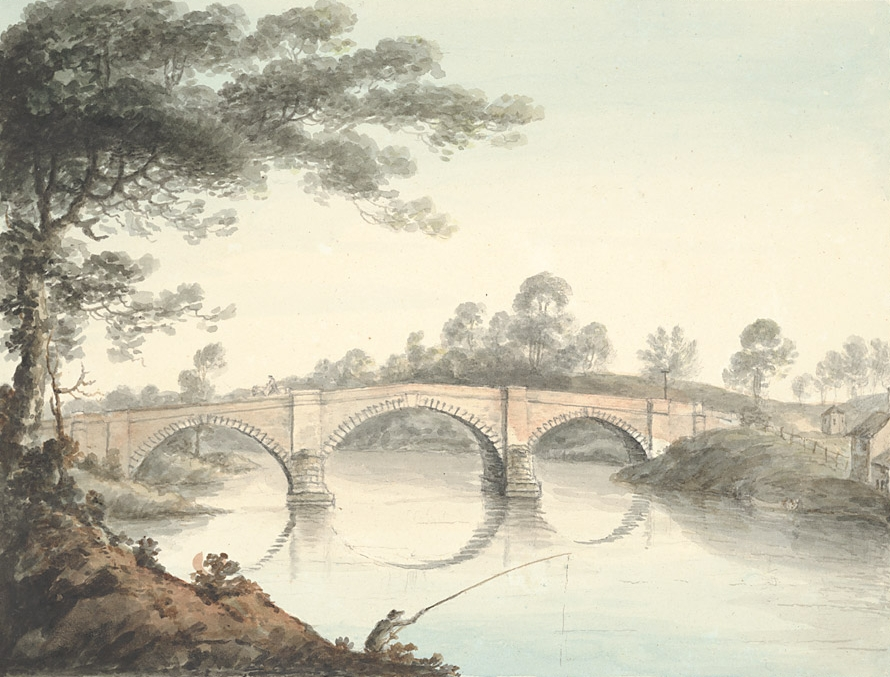
Montford Bridge, 1794

== Village ==
Most of the village is in the Montford parish, but some is covered by the Bicton parish.

The A5 road used to run through the village (over the Montford Bridge), but has been diverted via the Shrewsbury bypass. There are still some services, such as a shop (closed as of 2011) and a pub (the Wingfield Arms), in the village.

== Bridge ==
The bridge was Thomas Telford's first bridge design. It was built by John Carline and John Tilley between 1790 and 1792. It has three masonry elliptical arch spans, two of 55 ft, and the central one of 58 ft.

They are built of red sandstone obtained from Nesscliffe Hill four miles distant. The bridge cost £5,800 to build. Regarding the bridge, Telford wrote:

The contractors, Messrs. Carline and Tilley, being experienced workmen, it has proved a substantial edifice, having been completed upwards of forty years, and remaining quite perfect

It was widened in 1963 by adding a reinforced concrete slab. The bridge is now a Grade II listed building.

== See also ==
- Listed buildings in Montford, Shropshire
- Crossings of the River Severn

== Bibliography ==
- Cragg, R., Civil Engineering Heritage - Wales & West Central England, Thomas Telford Publishing, 1997, ISBN 0-7277-2576-9
