= Pont Cysyllte =

Road bridge in Trevor, Wrexham, Wales

Coordinates: 52.9707°N 3.0913°W

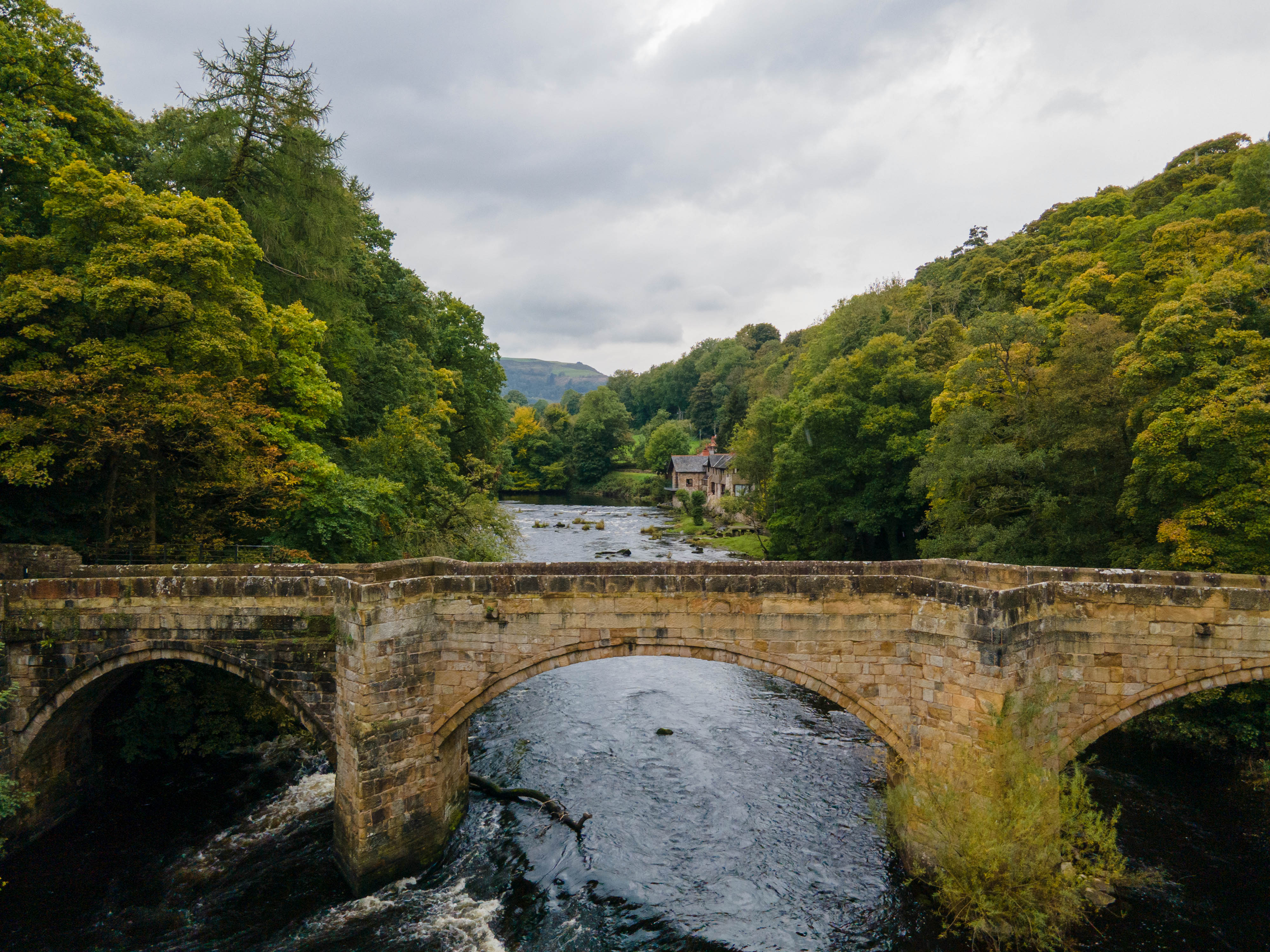
Pont Cysyllte, or Cysylltau Bridge

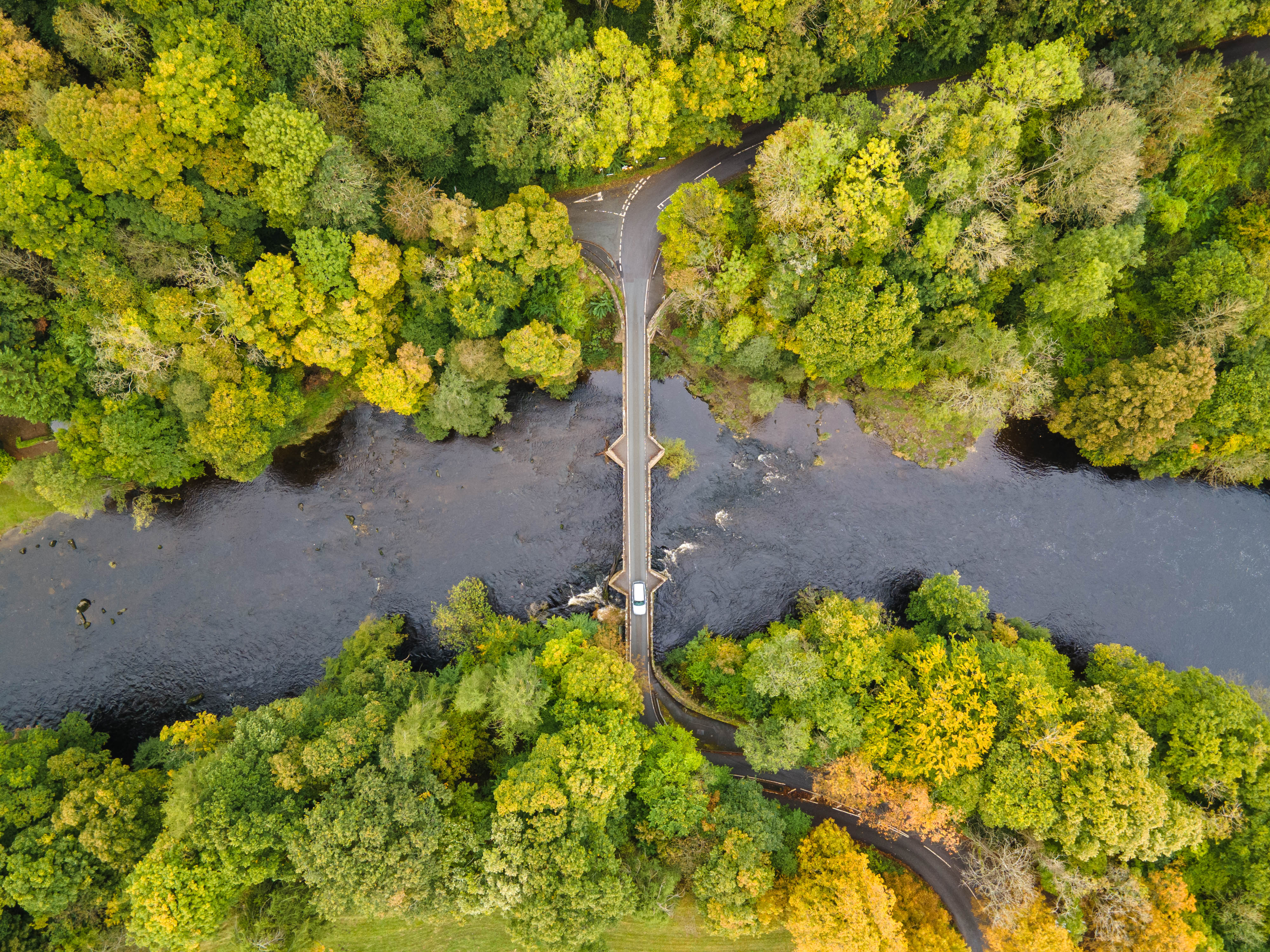
Aerial view of Pont Cysyllte

Pont Cysyllte, also known as Cysylltau Bridge or Bont Bridge, is a 17th-century road bridge crossing the River Dee near the village of Trevor, Wrexham County Borough, Wales. It lies 200 m west of Thomas Telford's Pontcysyllte Aqueduct and, carrying the B5434 road, is the main connection between Trevor and nearby Froncysyllte.

The sandstone bridge is dated '1697', though it was substantially rebuilt during the 18th century, and only the south arch and part of the south pier are original. It became a Grade I listed structure in 1963 and is also a scheduled monument.

The bridge comprises three arches, with full-height triangular cutwaters at up- and down-stream ends of both piers, each topped by a pedestrian refuge. The older, south arch has a span of 10.7 metres (35 ft) and the two newer arches have spans of 14.0 metres (46 ft) and 14.2 metres (47 ft).

The bridge is frequently damaged by motor vehicles being, at its narrowest, only 2.0 m (6 ft 6 in) wide. Vehicles are required to give way to any oncoming vehicle already on the bridge.
