= Mineral Products Association =

United Kingdom trade association

- Abbreviation: MPA
- Formation: 2009
- Legal status: Not for profit company
- Purpose: Trade association for the UK mineral products industry
- Location: 1st Floor, 297 Euston Road, London, United Kingdom
- Region served: UK
- Website: mineralproducts.org

The Mineral Products Association (MPA) is the United Kingdom trade association for the aggregates, asphalt, cement, concrete, dimension stone, lime, mortar, and industrial sand industries.

== Membership ==
The MPA, with the affiliation of the British Association of Reinforcement, British Calcium Carbonates Federation, Eurobitume UK, and United Kingdom Quality Ash Association, has a growing membership of 520 companies and is the sectoral voice for mineral products. MPA membership is made up of the vast majority of independent SME quarrying companies throughout the UK, as well as the nine major international and global companies. It covers 100% of UK cement production, 90% of aggregates production, 95% of asphalt and over 70% of ready-mixed concrete and precast concrete production. Each year the industry supplies £22 billion worth of materials and services to the UK economy and is the largest supplier to the construction industry, which has annual output valued at £144 billion. Industry production represents the largest materials flow in the UK economy and is also one of the largest manufacturing sectors.

== History ==
The MPA was formed in March 2009 from the merger of the Quarry Products Association, the British Cement Association and The Concrete Centre. It was officially launched in June 2009.

== Structure ==
Concrete Quarterly No. 1, July 1947.

The MPA has offices in London, Glasgow and Fron in Wales.

QPA Northern Ireland is affiliated to the MPA and has offices in Crumlin, County Antrim. The British Precast Concrete Federation (BPCF), the trade association of precast concrete manufacturers, is a member of the MPA and is based in Leicester.

The MPA has regional divisions, for London & South East, South West, East Anglia, Midlands, Wales, North, Scotland and Northern Ireland.

== The Concrete Centre ==
The Concrete Centre was formed in 2003 and since 2009 has been part of the MPA. The Concrete Centre promotes the use of concrete in construction through the provision of resources to enable designers to follow best practice for the design of concrete and masonry. The Concrete Centre publishes a journal, Concrete Quarterly which was first published by the Cement and Concrete Association in 1947. The journal showcases the use of concrete in construction projects in the United Kingdom and worldwide. The CQ archive is available online.

== See also ==
- Concrete Series
