= Trevor Basin =

Canal basin in Wales

Coordinates: 52°58′22.0″N 3°5′11.6″W

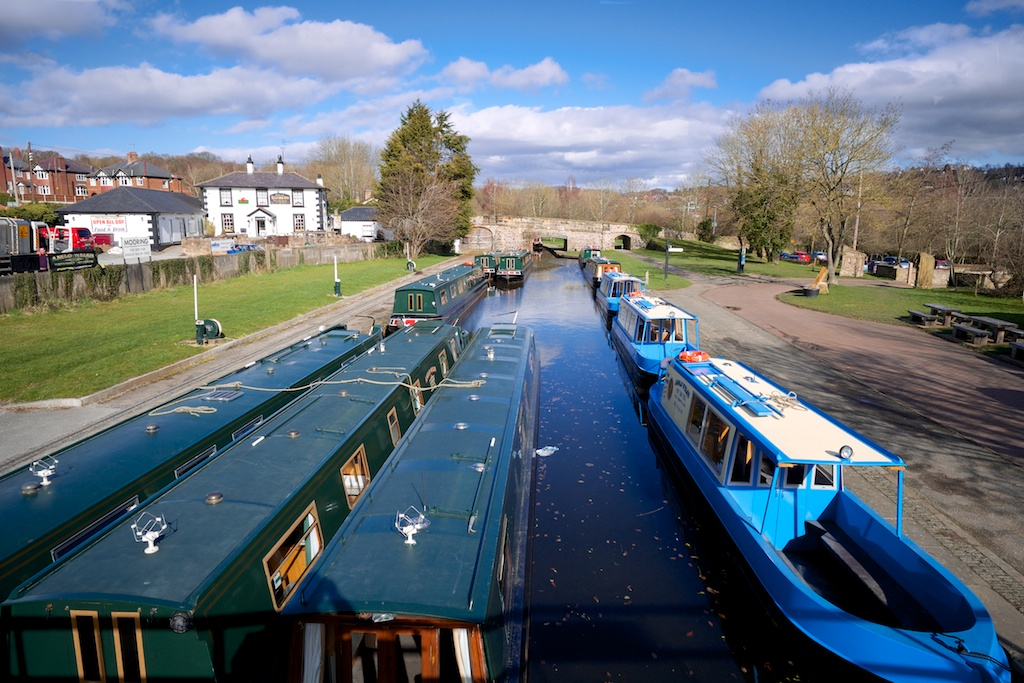
The Trevor Basin looking northwards

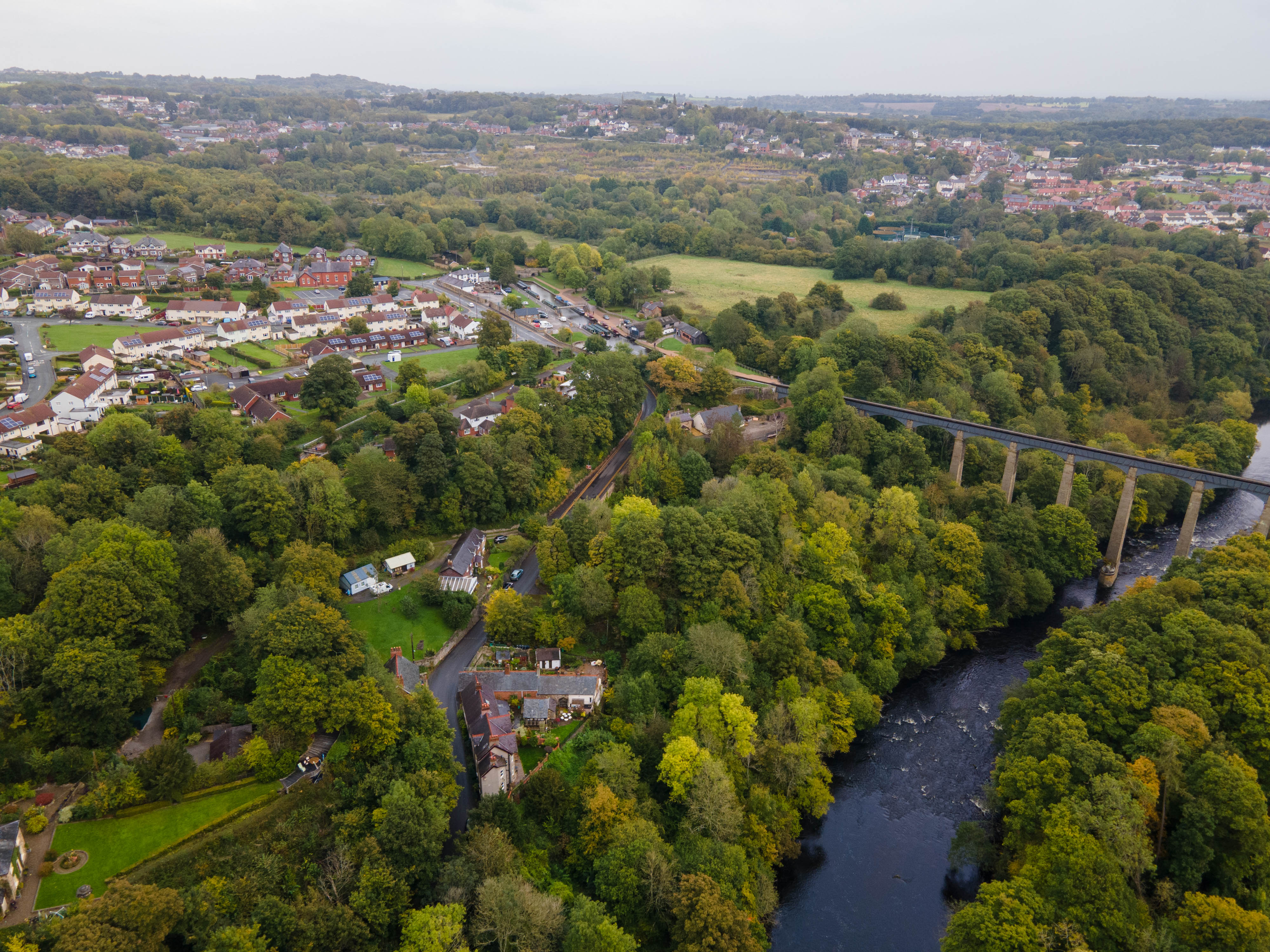
Bird-eye view of the basin, located at the upper-left centre of the photo, left of the aqueduct.

Trevor Basin is a canal basin on the Llangollen Canal, situated near Trevor, Wrexham County Borough, Wales, in between Llangollen and Ruabon.

The basin was originally built at the northern end of the central section of the Ellesmere Canal, just 150yds north of the Pontcysyllte Aqueduct.

With the abandonment of the planned extension to Chester, Trevor Basin became the terminus of the Ellesmere Canal itself.

The canal was later extended westwards, to Llangollen and the Horseshoe Falls, to act as a feeder.

The basin has become a tourist destination owing to the adjacent aqueduct. It was redeveloped and reopened for boat traffic in 2022.

== See also ==
- Canals of the United Kingdom
- History of the British canal system
- List of canal basins in the United Kingdom
