= John Stanley Terrington =

John Stanley Terrington (28 December 1903 - 1987) was a British civil engineer known for his writings on the use of concrete in construction in the mid twentieth century. Terrington was a graduate of the University of London (BSc), an associate of the City and Guilds Institute (ACGI), and an associate member of the Institution of Civil Engineers. He later obtained his PhD and was a lecturer at Borough Polytechnic (now London South Bank University).

== Selected publications ==
- The calculation of bending and torsional effects in girders. B.S.C., 1958.
- The calculation of stresses in beams and girders due to simultaneous transverse bending & torsion. British Constructional Steelwork Association, 1968.
- Combined bending and torsion of beams and girders: the calculation of stresses in beams and girders due to simultaneous transverse bending and torsion. British Constructional Steelwork Association, 1968.
- Design of arch ribs for reinforced concrete roofs. Concrete Publications, London, 1937.
- Design of arch roofs. Concrete Publications, London, 1937. (Concrete Series)
- Design of domes. Concrete Publications, London, 1937. (Reprinted from Concrete and Constructional Engineering) (Concrete Series)
- Design of non-planar concrete roofs. Concrete Publications, London, 1964. (Concrete Series) (With Frederick Henry Turner)
- Design of pyramid roofs. Concrete Publications, London, 1939. (Concrete Series)
- Surveying and levelling. London, 1939. (Lockwood's Modern Handbooks)
