= Concrete Series =

Title page of Concrete surface finishes, renderings and terrazzo by W.S. Gray & H.L. Childe. (2nd reprinted, 1948)

The Concrete Series was a series of books about the use of concrete in construction that was published by Concrete Publications Limited of Dartmouth Street, London, from the 1930s to the 1960s.

== History ==
The Concrete Series was a book series about the use of concrete in construction that was published by Concrete Publications Limited of Dartmouth Street, London, from the 1930s to the 1960s.

The series was published at a time when concrete was increasingly being used in building design and for public works such as road building. The series ran to in excess of 35 titles.

Later, the series was continued by the Cement and Concrete Association and Spon Press, part of Taylor & Francis group.

== Titles ==
This is an incomplete list of titles in the series:

- Arch design simplified. W.A. Fairhurst, 1946.
- Concrete farm silos, granaries and tanks. A.M. Pennington, 1942.
- Concrete surface finishes, renderings and terrazzo. W.S. Gray & H.L. Childe, 1935. (2nd revised edition 1943)
- Design of arch roofs. J.S. Terrington, 1937.
- Design of domes. J.S. Terrington, 1937. (Reprinted from Concrete and Constructional Engineering)
- Design of pyramid roofs. J.S. Terrington, 1939.
- Prestressed concrete designer's handbook, P.W. Abeles and F.H. Turner, 1962.
- Reinforced concrete chimneys. C. Percy Taylor & Leslie Turner, 1940.

== See also ==
- Concrete Quarterly
- Modernist architecture
