= Ellesmere Canal =

Canal in the United Kingdom

Coordinates: 53°17′N 2°53′W

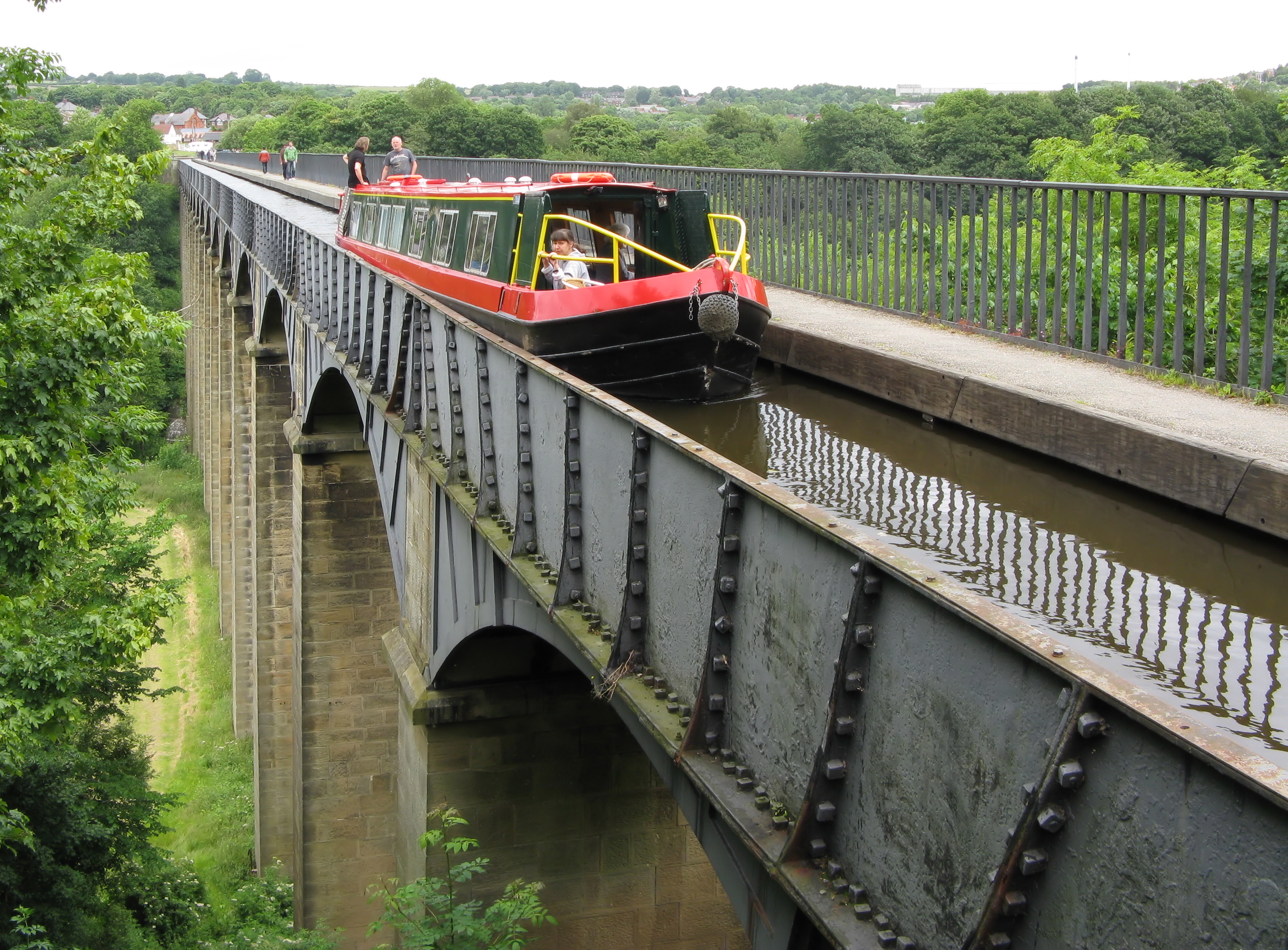
The Pontcysyllte Aqueduct opened to traffic on the Ellesmere Canal in 1805.

The Ellesmere Canal was a waterway in England and Wales that was planned to carry boat traffic between the rivers Mersey and Severn. The proposal would have created a link between the Port of Liverpool and the mineral industries in north east Wales and the manufacturing centres in the West Midlands. However, the canal was never completed as intended because of its rising costs and failure to generate the expected commercial traffic.

The Ellesmere Canal, which was first proposed in 1791, would have created a waterway between Netherpool, Cheshire, and Shrewsbury. However, only certain sections were completed; these were eventually incorporated into the Chester Canal, Montgomery Canal and Shropshire Union Canal. Although several major civil engineering feats were accomplished, major building work ceased following the completion of the Pontcysyllte Aqueduct in 1805. The northern end of the navigation's mainline ended 16 miles (25 km) from Chester at Trevor Basin near Ruabon and its southern end was at Weston Lullingfields about 9 miles (15 km) from Shrewsbury.

As part of the rebranding of Britain's industrial waterways as leisure destinations, the surviving central section is now called the Llangollen Canal; even though historically its builders had no intention of sending boat traffic to Llangollen. The branch, from which the waterway now takes its name, was primarily a water feeder from the River Dee above the town. Therefore it was not built as a broad-gauge canal, hence its inherently narrow design.

== History ==
=== Route planning ===
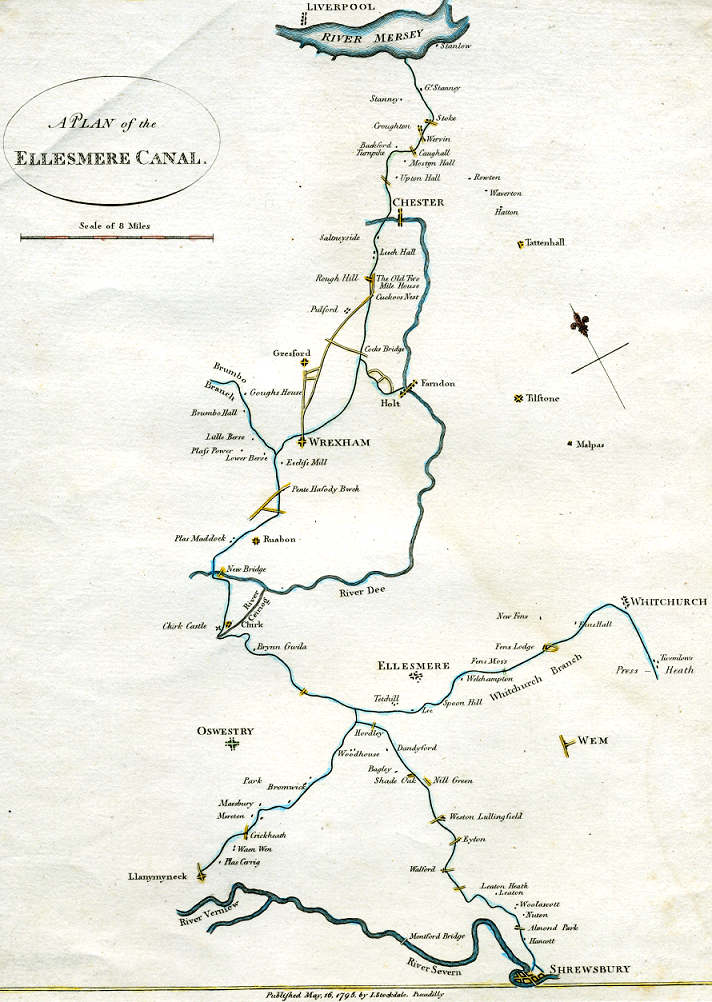
Map of the original proposed route of the Ellesmere canal published in 1795

Ellesmere and Chester Canal Act 1793
- Act of Parliament
- Parliament of Great Britain
- Long title: An Act for making and maintaining a Navigable Canal from the River Severn, at Shrewsbury, in the County of Salop, to the River Mersey, at or near Netherpool in the County of Chester, and also for making and maintaining certain Collateral Cuts from the said intended Canal.
- Citation: 33 Geo. 3. c. 91
- Territorial extent: Great Britain

Dates
- Royal assent: 30 April 1793
- Commencement: 30 April 1793 (Note: The Acts of Parliament (Commencement) Act 1793.)
- Repealed: 21 June 1827
Other legislation
| Repealed by | Ellesmere and Chester Canal Act 1827 |

Status: Repealed

Text of statute as originally enacted

Ellesmere and Chester Canal Navigation Act 1842
- Act of Parliament
- Parliament of the United Kingdom
- Long title: An Act to alter, amend, and enlarge the Powers and Provisions of the several Acts relating to the Ellesmere and Chester Canal Navigation.
- Citation: 5 & 6 Vict. c. xxxiii
- Territorial extent: United Kingdom

Dates
- Royal assent: 31 May 1842
- Commencement: 31 May 1842 (Note: The Acts of Parliament (Commencement) Act 1793.)

Status: Current legislation

Text of statute as originally enacted

The formal proposal for the canal was launched at a meeting in Ellesmere in 1791 for a canal from Netherpool (now Ellesmere Port) on the River Mersey to the River Dee at Chester. It would then go in a south easterly direction via Overton (south of Wrexham) to the River Severn at Shrewsbury. Branches would then be cut to the iron making and coal mining areas at Bersham between Wrexham and Ruabon and to the copper mines at Llanymynech. By 1793 an act of Parliament, the Ellesmere and Chester Canal Act 1793 (33 Geo. 3. c. 91), had been passed allowing the Ellesmere Canal company to build the canal.

However this route of the canal beyond Chester was not to the liking of all backers. They wanted the canal's course to follow a more westerly route from the Dee to the Severn passing directly through the Welsh mining areas. Eventually this proposal was the one that canal engineer John Duncombe followed when he eventually surveyed the route. Notable civil engineer William Jessop was called into advise; he too recommended the route surveyed by Duncombe. Jessop was eventually appointed the project's engineer while Thomas Telford was appointed as General Agent. The northernmost section, a contour canal, from the Mersey to the Dee was completed in 1797. This allowed the company to generate revenue from tolls to help finance construction of the rest of the canal.

However the westerly route posed formidable engineering obstacles. Close to the Eglwyseg and Ruabon mountains, there were deep river valleys to be crossed and high ground to be tunnelled. Duncombe's survey involved a climb of 303 feet (92 m) from Chester to Wrexham, a 4,607-yard (4,213 m) tunnel at Ruabon, a high level crossing over the Dee at Pontcysyllte, a further tunnel and aqueduct near Chirk, and a tunnel in Shropshire near Weston Lullingfields.

A plan of the canal, published in 1795, showed the route between Netherpool in the north to Shrewsbury to the south:

River Mersey; Great Stanney; Stoak; Wervin; Caughall; Chester; Saltneyside; Lache Hall; Rough Hill; Cuckoos Nest; Wrexham; Ruabon; Plas Madoc; Chirk; Hordley; Dandyford; Shade Oak; Weston Lullingfields; Eyton; Walford; Hancott; Shrewsbury; River Severn.

The canal plan would also have four branches:

- A 3-mile (5 km) branch would run to Holt.
- A 5-mile (8 km) branch would run from near Wrexham to Brymbo.
- A 10-mile (16 km) branch would run from near Hordley to Llanymynech, via Maesbury, Morton and Crickheath.
- A 17-mile (27 km) branch would run from near Tetchill to Prees Heath, via Welshampton, Fenn's Moss and Whitchurch.

Originally Jessop had suggested that the cheaper solution was to use locks on both sides of Vale of Llangollen to take the canal down to a more manageable height for the second, upstream crossing of the River Dee at Froncysyllte. Rather than crossing at full height, the locks would reuse water by backpumping. But by 1795 Jessop and Telford had changed their decision. Instead they developed a proposal for a cast-iron aqueduct to maintain the original level.

=== Construction ===
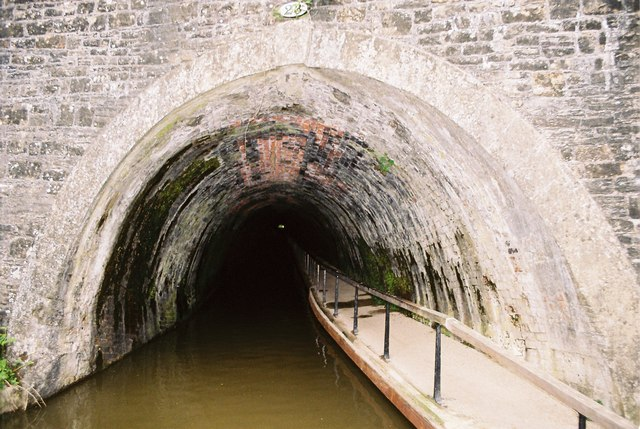
Chirk Tunnel on the Ellesmere Canal was completed in 1802.

In 1796 the Llanymynech Branch was opened, linking the main line at Frankton Junction with Llanymynech. This joined the Montgomeryshire Canal at Carreghofa Locks when the Montgomeryshire opened in 1797.

In 1796, Thomas Telford constructed a feeder reservoir lake in Moss Valley, Wrexham to provide water to the length of canal between Trevor Basin and Chester. However, as the plan to build this section was cancelled in 1798, the isolated feeder and a stretch of navigation between Ffrwd and a basin in Summerhill was abandoned. Remnants of the feeder channel are visible in Gwersyllt. A street in the village is still named Heol Camlas (Canal Way).

The contour section from the River Mersey to the River Dee at Chester was joined to the Chester Canal in 1797.

On the main line section, the Chirk Aqueduct was opened in 1801, and Pontcysyllte Aqueduct in 1805. However, by this time the proposed line from the Dee at Chester to Ruabon had been abandoned as uneconomic. The canal was therefore terminated at Trevor Basin, 2 miles (3 km) southwest of Ruabon.

Also abandoned was the plan to reach the Severn, as the Shrewsbury Canal was already serving the town, and the poor navigational state of the Severn meant that additional traffic would not justify the cost of the building works.

As the canal would now not reach its proposed main source of water northwest of Wrexham, a feeder was constructed along the side of the Dee valley to Horseshoe Falls at Llantysilio. This narrow feeder branch was made navigable, allowing boats to reach Llangollen.

In the end the only parts of the main line of the canal to be built was the extreme northern line from the Mersey to Chester and the 18-mile (29 km) central section from Trevor Basin to Weston Lullingfields. As this left the middle part isolated from the rest of the UK waterways network, the planned Whitchurch branch was re-routed. A 29-mile (47 km) link was built from Frankton via Ellesmere to the Chester Canal at Hurleston Junction in sections between 1797 and 1806. Despite the circuitous route, it was considered to be the main line. The extension also included an arm to Whitchurch because the town had been by-passed by the new route. A branch was also originally intended to reach Prees in Shropshire; however the line was only constructed as far as Quina Brook, 1-mile (1.5 km) from the village.

The section of waterway from Frankton Junction to Weston Lullingfields, which was originally intended to be the main line to Shrewsbury, became the Weston Branch. The uncompleted part between Weston Lullingfields and the River Severn would have been 9 1/2 miles (15 km) long, with 107 feet (33 m) of lockage and a 487-yard (445 m) tunnel at Weston Lullingfileds.

=== Working canal ===
Ellesmere and Chester Canal Company Act 1845
- Act of Parliament
- Parliament of the United Kingdom
- Long title: An Act for uniting the Birmingham and Liverpool Junction Canal Navigation Company with the Ellesmere and Chester Canal Company.
- Citation: 8 & 9 Vict. c. ii

Dates
- Royal assent: 8 May 1845

Due to the constraints placed on the canal by its incomplete design, the Ellesmere Canal struggled financially throughout its operating life as an industrial waterway. In 1813, the Ellesmere Canal company merged with the Chester Canal to form the Ellesmere and Chester Canal Company under the Ellesmere and Chester Canals Unification Act 1813 (53 Geo. 3. c. lxxx). This business was then merged with the Birmingham and Liverpool Junction Canal by the Ellesmere and Chester Canal Company Act 1845 (8 & 9 Vict. c. ii). A year later the canal was taken over again by the formation of the Shropshire Union Railways and Canal Company.

By 1917 the Weston Branch had closed following a breach near Hordley Wharf. In 1939 traffic on the line from Hurleston to Llangollen had all but ceased. All remaining parts of the Ellesmere Canal network, other than the northern line from Ellesmere Port to Chester, were closed to navigation by the London Midland and Scottish Railway (Canals) Act 1944 (8 & 9 Geo. 6. c. ii). However, the canal from Hurleston to Llangollen was retained as a water feeder for the Shropshire Union Canal main line and for drinking water. In 1955 an agreement with the Mid & South East Cheshire Water Board secured the canal's future.

=== Present day ===
Despite the formal closure, increasing popularity of the canal with pleasure boats led to its acceptance as an important amenity and rebranding as the Llangollen Canal. As the canal was never intended to go to Llangollen, this renaming is an ironic twist symbolic of the canal's convoluted development.

The Ellesmere Canal south of Frankton Junction (the Llanymynech Branch), together with the Montgomeryshire Canal, today form the Montgomery Canal.

The isolated section from Chester to Ellesmere Port is considered part of the Shropshire Union Canal main line.

The Weston Branch is now infilled save for a very short section which has a Canal & River Trust amenity block.

== Route ==
=== Ellesmere Port to Chester ===
The canal starts at Ellesmere Port Dock by the Mersey. Originally goods would be transferred directly from inland waterways craft into river-going vessels at the dock, which would enter and exit through tidal lock gates. However, in the 1890s, with the construction of the Manchester Ship Canal, the basin became detached from the river. Traffic was controlled by a set of two-lock staircases.

A contour canal runs between Ellesmere Port and Chester following the course of a natural river valley that encompasses Backford Brook and the Bache valley. The canal enters Chester Basin (wharf) at the junction with the Chester Canal. At this point, there is also a 4-lock branch that once led down to the River Dee and Port of Chester.

When the Ellesmere Canal reached the Chester Canal, the configuration of the staircase locks at Chester was altered. The original 5-lock staircase was replaced by a deeper three-lock arrangement. At this point, the section is now part of the Shropshire Union Canal.

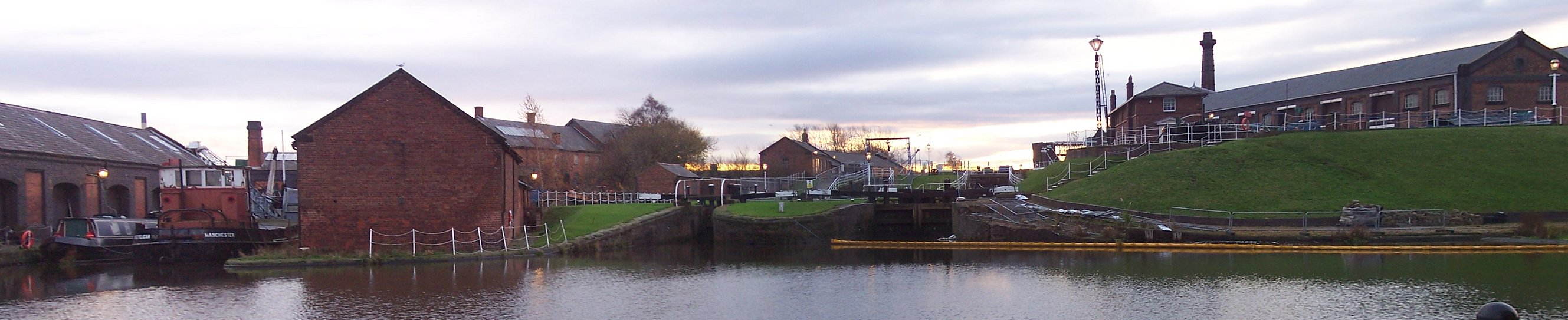
Whitby Locks, Ellesmere Port Docks.

=== Hurleston to Frankton Junction ===
This section was added to link the canal to the national network. It became the Ellesmere Branch of the Shropshire Union Canal and is now part of the Llangollen Canal.

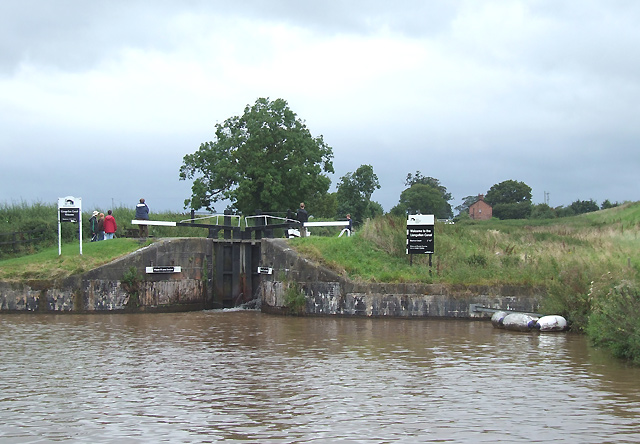
The Llangollen Canal begins here with a flight of four locks raising the water level more than 34 feet (10 m) from the Shropshire Union.

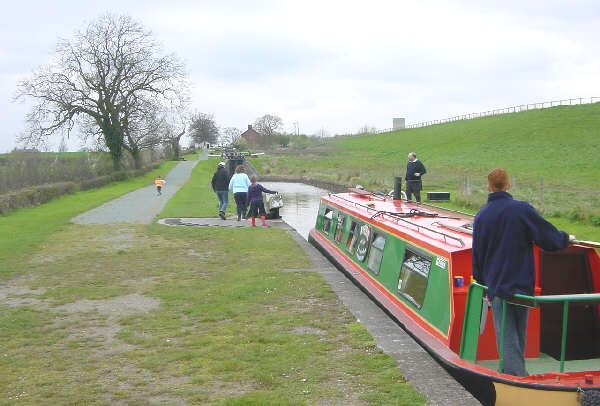
Hurleston Locks are at the eastern end of the Llangollen Canal, at the junction with the Shropshire Union Canal.

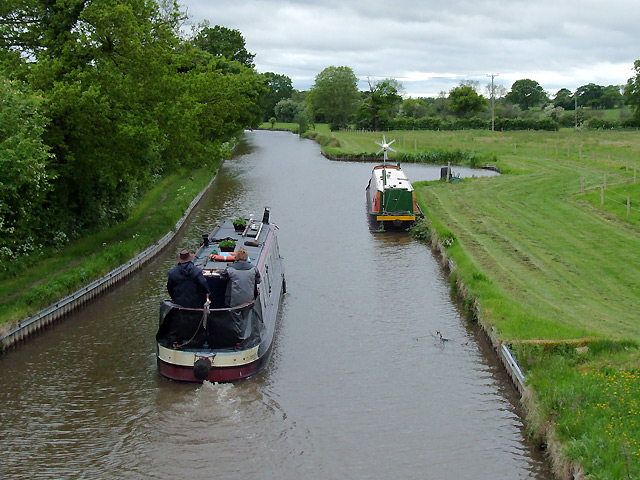
Stoneley Green Bridge near to Ravensmoor, Cheshire

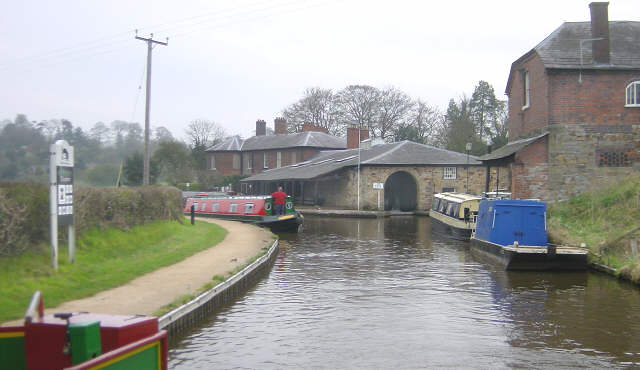
Canalside buildings close to the canal junction at Ellesmere, Shropshire

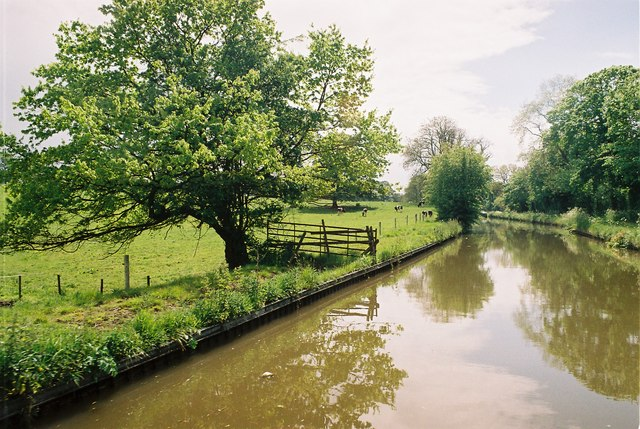
South of Springhill Bridge

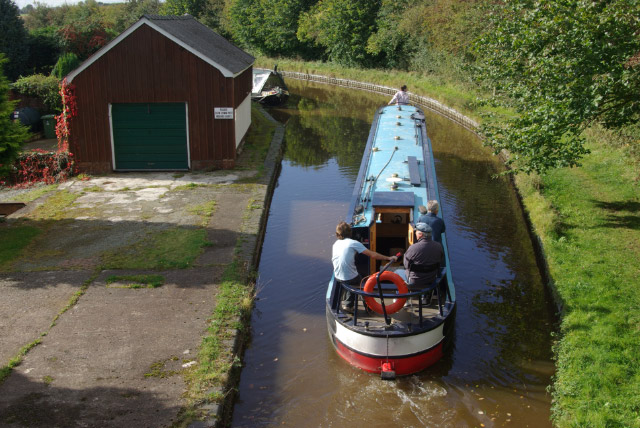
A boat passing Bettisfield Bridge heading towards Ellesmere

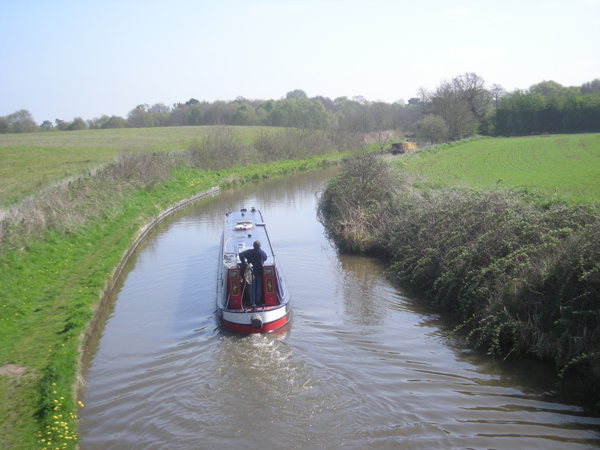
Sailing east from Lyneal Lane Bridge

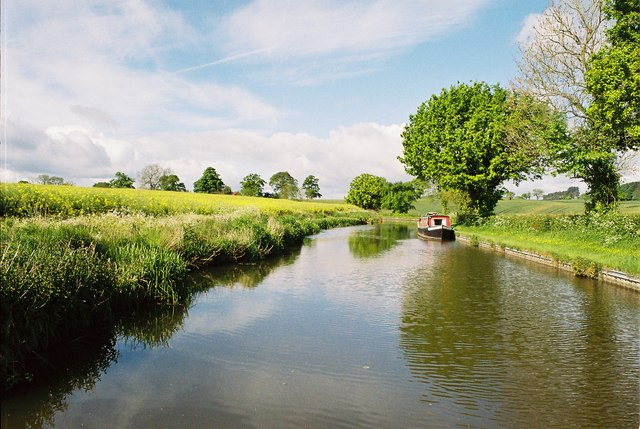
South-east between Coachman's and Clay Pit bridges

=== Frankton Junction to Trevor Basin ===
This was the principal part of the original main line of the canal. It became the Llangollen Branch of the Shropshire Union Canal and is now part of the Llangollen Canal.

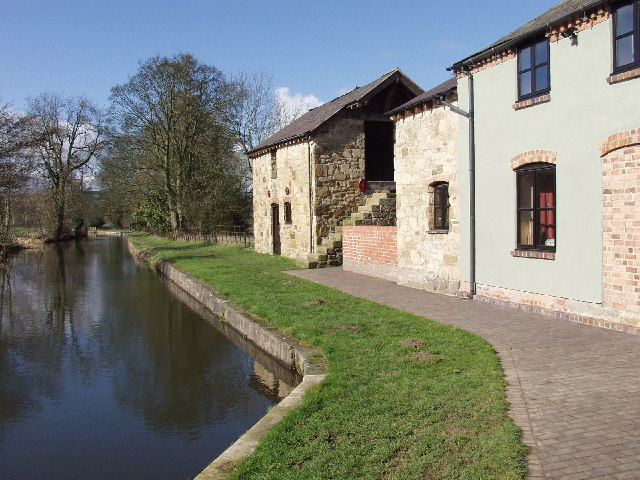
Refurbished banksman's cottage and outhouses at St Martin's Moor

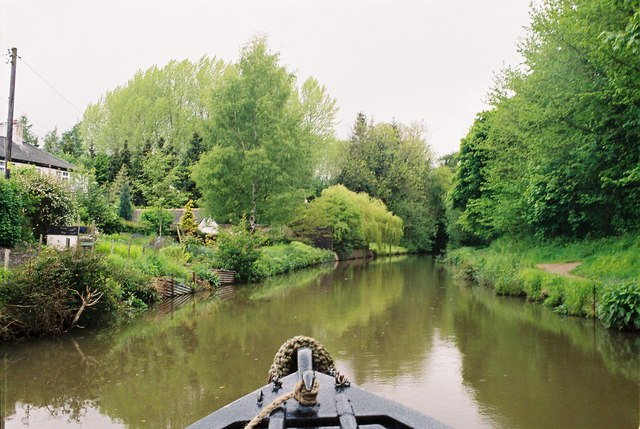
Rhoswiel

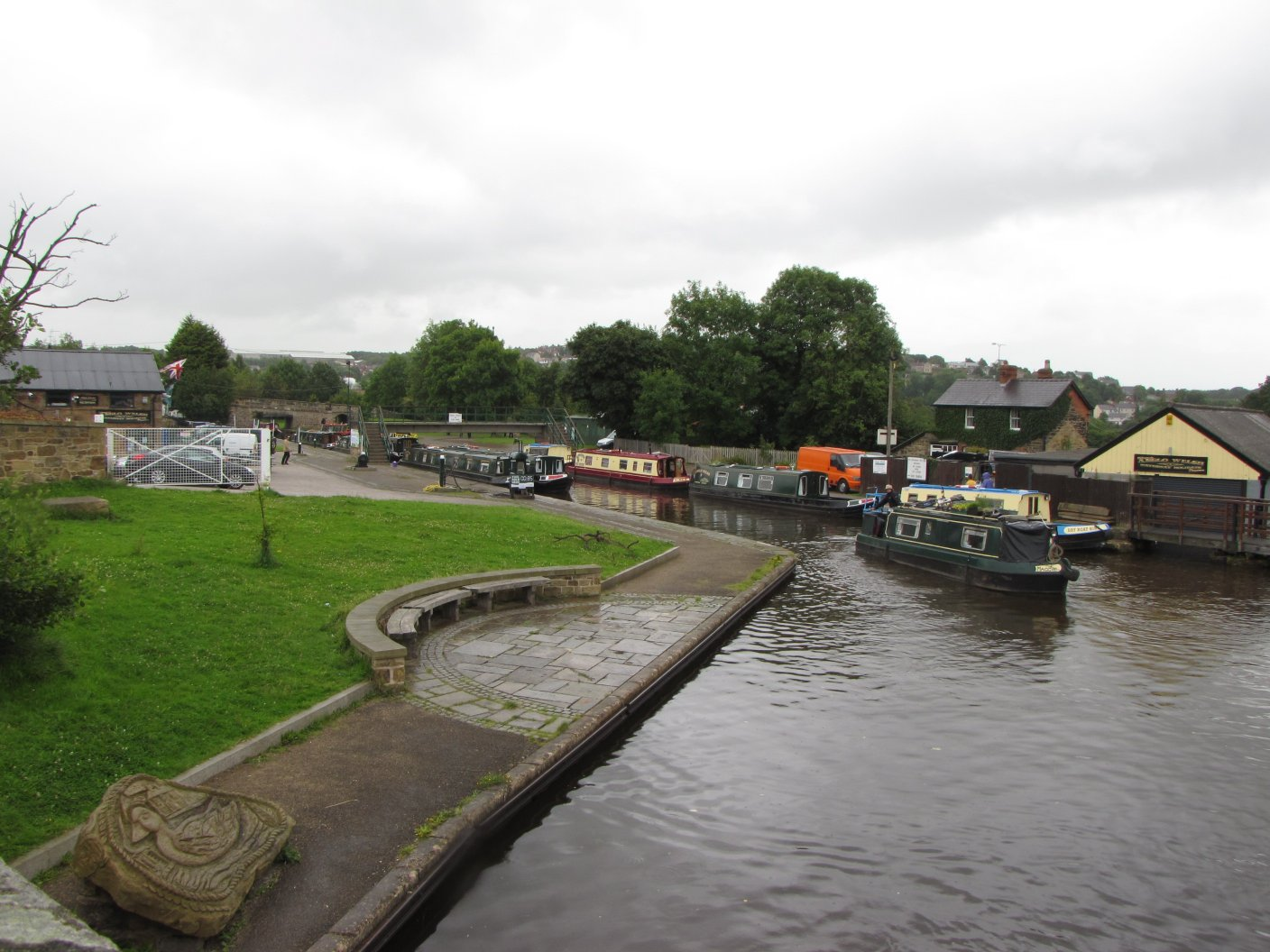
Looking towards Trevor Basin

=== Trevor Basin to Horseshoe Falls ===
This section of the canal was added as a navigable feeder. It is now part of the Llangollen Canal.

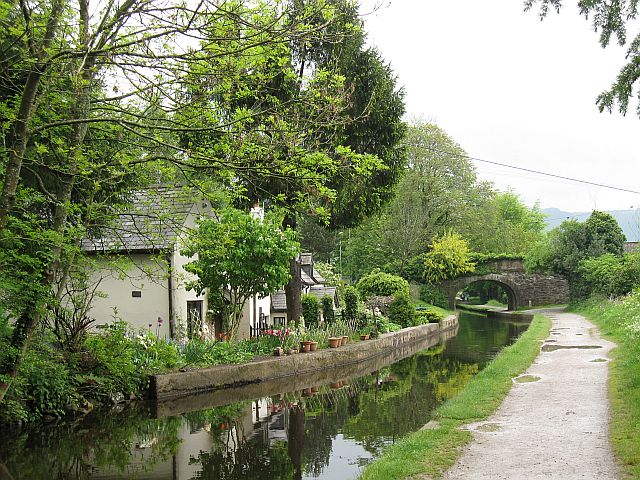
Canalside cottage near the Royal International Pavilion at Llangollen

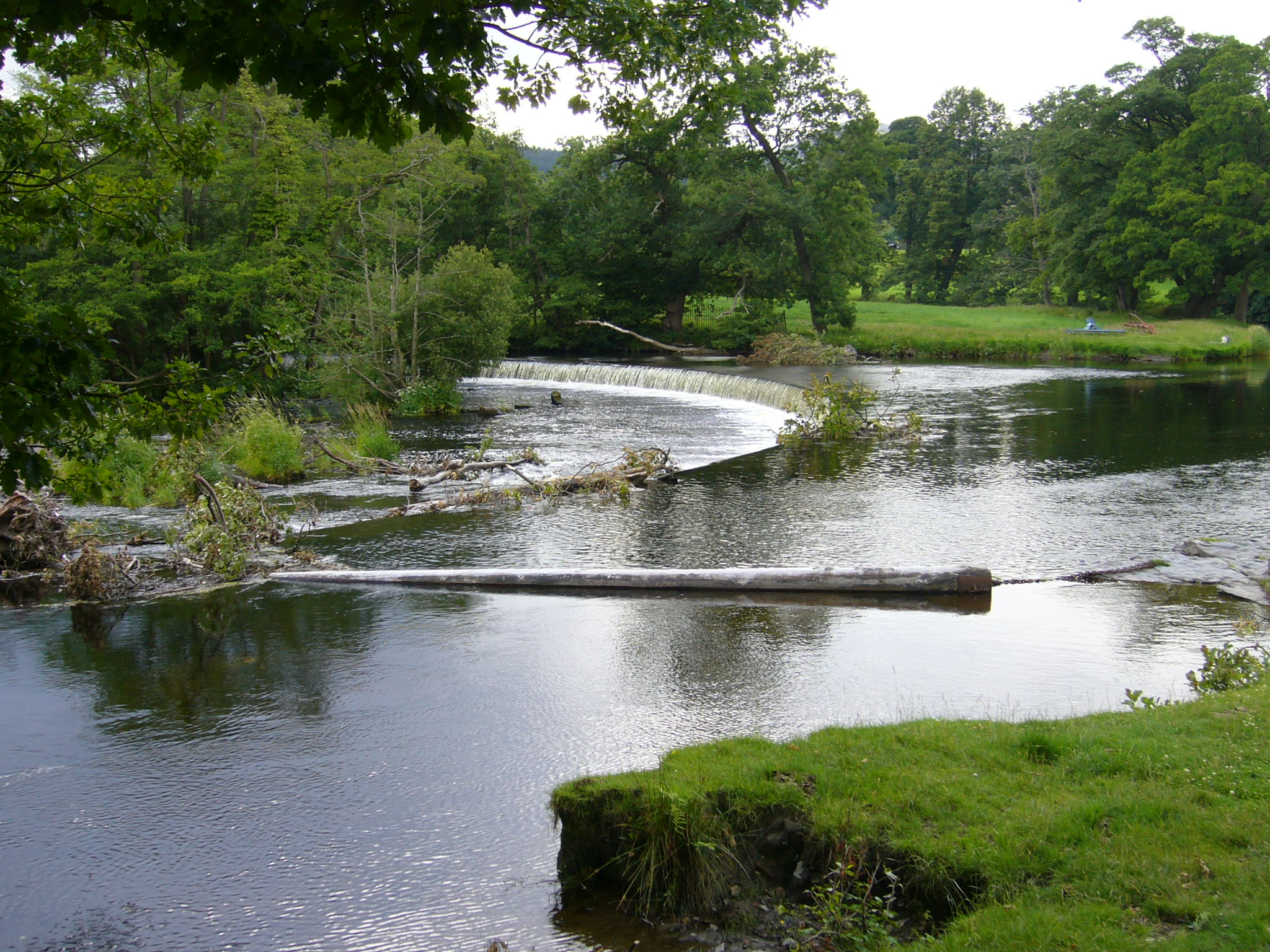
The Horseshoe Falls, which are about three miles west of Llangollen, provide the water feed for the canal.

=== Frankton Junction to Llanymynech ===
This section (the Llanymynech Branch) is now designated as part of the Montgomery Canal (which combines the branch and the Montgomeryshire Canal). The section from Frankton Junction to Lockgate Bridge (where the branch meets the Weston Arm) was originally intended to be the main line of the Ellesmere Canal.

Bridge numbering starts at Hurleston Junction, where the Llangollen Canal and the Shropshire Union Canal main line meet, and continues down the Llanymynech Branch despite the Llangollen and Montgomery Canal now being regarded as two separate canals.

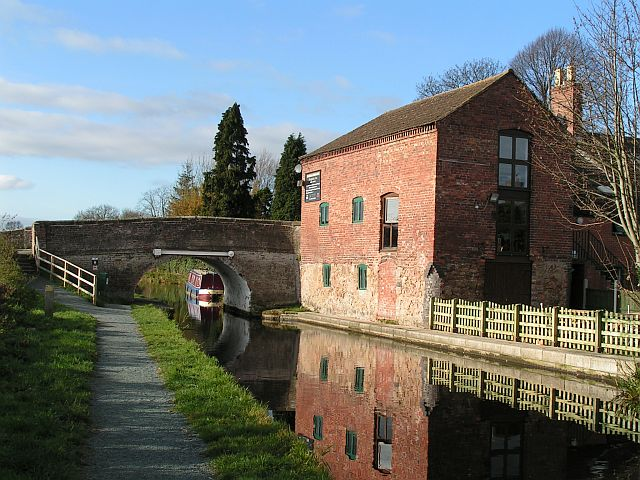
The canal at Maesbury Marsh

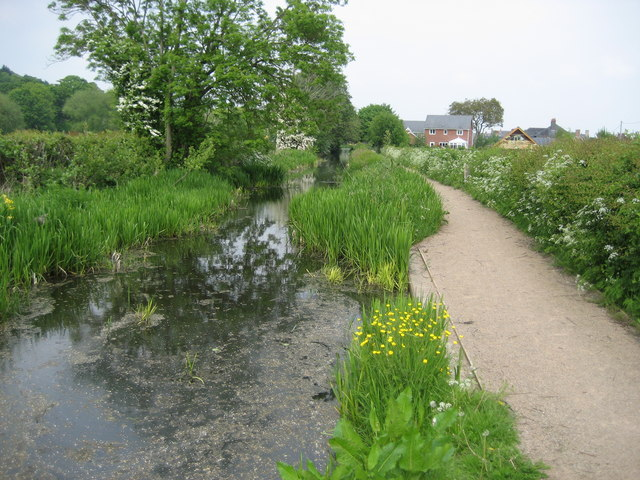
This part of the towpath approaching Llanymynech has been adopted by the Offa's Dyke Path.

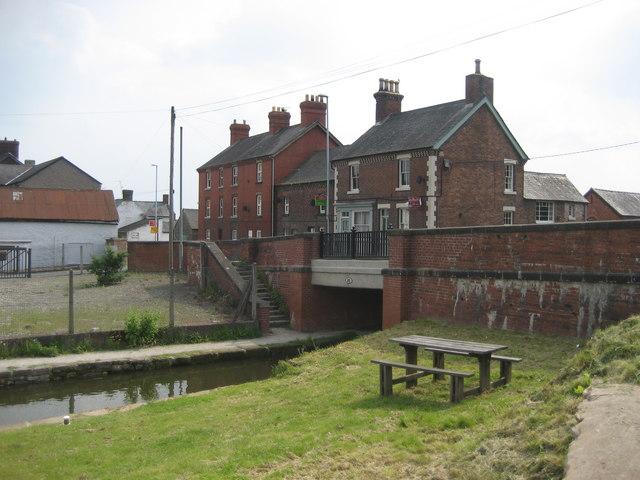
The bridge carries the A483 in Llanymynech.

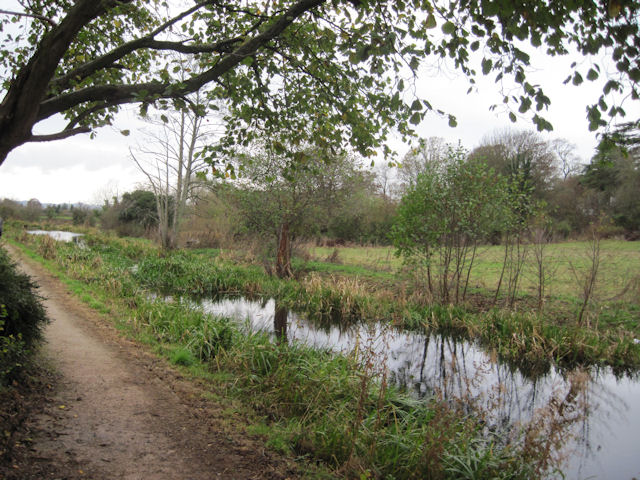
Stretches of the canal west of Llanymynech are overgrown.

=== Lockgate Bridge to Weston Lullingfields ===
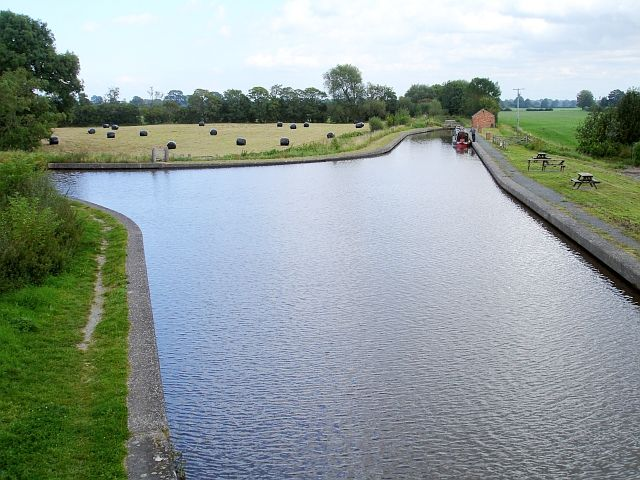
The Weston Branch today, now a short arm of the Montgomery Canal

This section was originally intended to be the main line of the canal and is now infilled. The 5 1/2-mile-long (9 km) arm had wharves at Hordley, Dandyford, Pedlar's Bridge, Shade Oak and Weston Lullingfields. At Weston Lullingfields the canal company built a wharf, four lime kilns, a public house, stables, a clerk's house and weighing machine. These were opened in 1797 and closed in 1917 when the Weston branch was closed following a breach of the canal.

== See also ==
- Canals of Great Britain
- History of the British canal system

== Bibliography ==
- Todd, John (2003) "A canal of many parts", Waterways world, 32 (2: Feb.), p. 46–49 & (3: Mar.), p. 48–51.
- Wilson, Edward A. (1975) The Ellesmere and Llangollen Canal : an historical background, London : Phillimore, ISBN 0-85033-109-9
- Denton, John Horsley (1984). Montgomeryshire Canal and the Llanymynech Branch of the Ellesmere Canal. Lapal Publications. ISBN 0-9509238-1-8.
- Waterways World (2005). Canal Guide 2 – Llangollen and Montgomery Canals. Waterways World Ltd. ISBN 1-870002-89-X.
