= Trevor, Wrexham =

Village in Wrexham County Borough, Wales

Coordinates: 52.975°N 3.089°W

Trevor: Welsh: Trefor
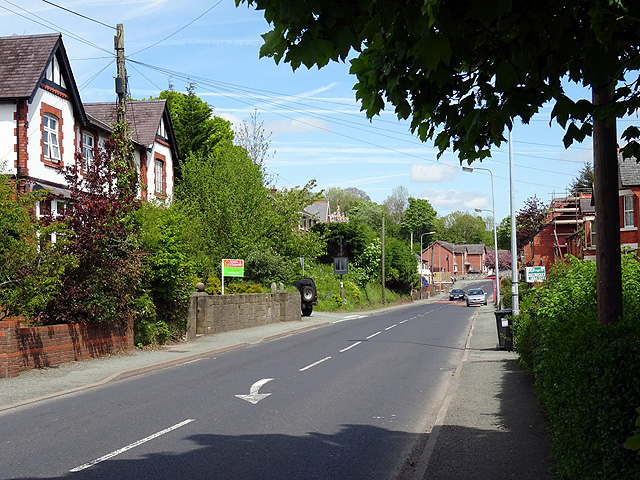
- Llangollen Road in Trevor

- Location within Wrexham
- OS grid reference: SJ268425
- Community: Llangollen Rural
- Principal area: Wrexham
- Preserved county: Clwyd
- Country: Wales
- Sovereign state: United Kingdom
- Post town: LLANGOLLEN
- Postcode district: LL20
- Dialling code: 01978
- Police: North Wales
- Fire: North Wales
- Ambulance: Welsh
- UK Parliament: Clwyd South
- Senedd Cymru – Welsh Parliament: Clwyd South

Trevor (Welsh: Trefor) is a village in Wrexham County Borough, Wales. It is situated in the Vale of Llangollen, on the A539 between Llangollen and Wrexham, in the community of Llangollen Rural, and in the historic county of Denbighshire.

Its name is an anglicised version of the Welsh place-name Trefor, meaning "large village". This was one of the old townships of the parish of Llangollen, giving its name to both a powerful landowning family whose ancestral home was in the township, and to the later industrial settlement represented by the modern village. In common with neighbouring Froncysyllte, Trevor is largely made up of nineteenth- and twentieth-century cottages for workers in the area's traditional industries of limestone quarrying and brick-making. Although these industries have now disappeared the area has a rich industrial archeology.

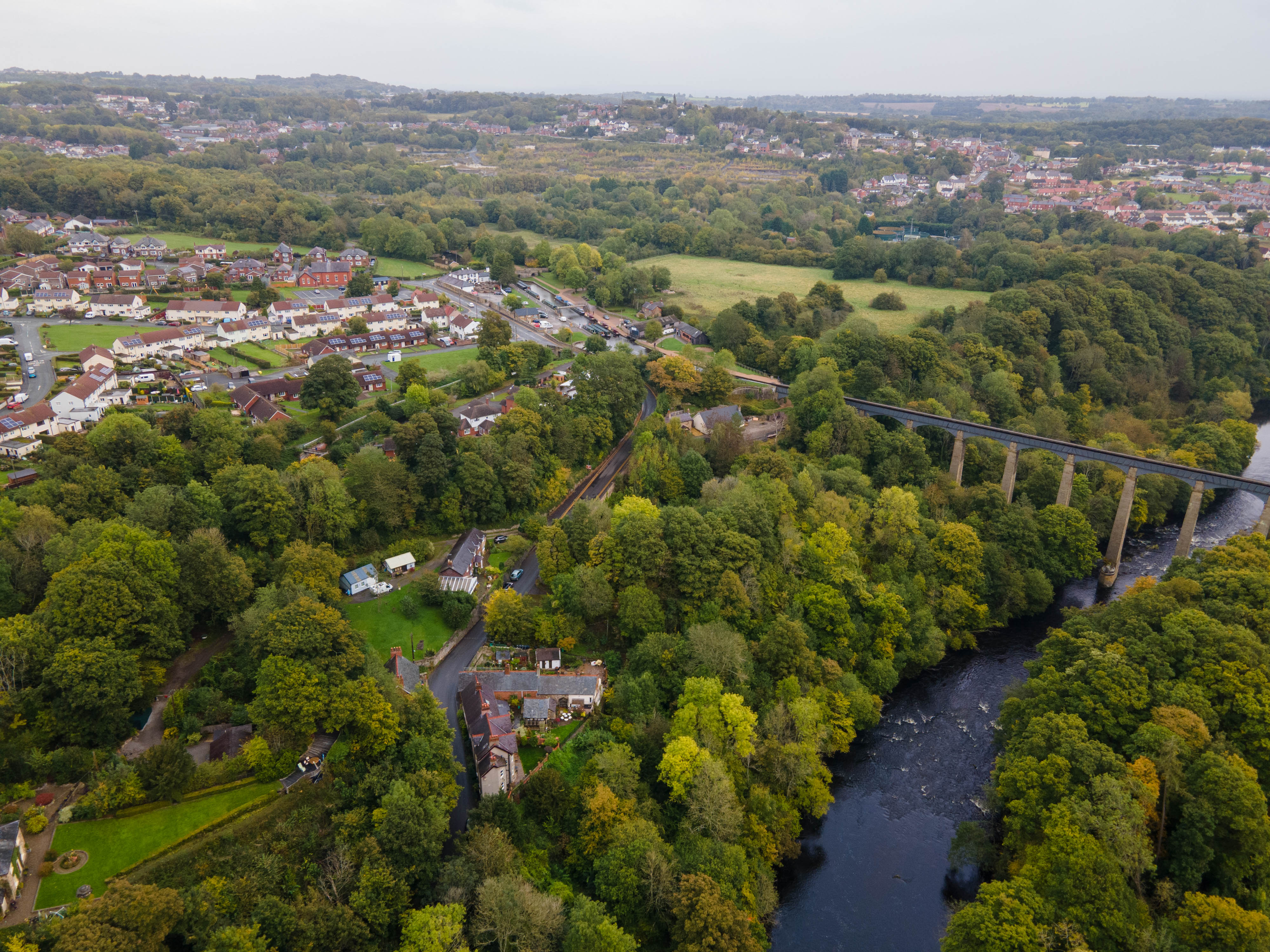
The village shown with the River Dee, Pontcysyllte Aqueduct, Trevor Basin and Llangollen Canal.

Trevor lies on the Llangollen Canal at the northern end of the Pontcysyllte Aqueduct: the Trevor Basin is at the north end of the aqueduct.

Until 1965, the village had a railway station on the now-closed Ruabon–Barmouth line.

The Offa's Dyke Path passes through the village.

== See also ==
- Trevor Hall - grade I listed country house
