= Concrete chipping =

Concrete chipping is a process which requires trained chippers or a robotically-controlled machine with an ultra high pressure water source (20,000 psi) to enter the drums of ready-mix concrete trucks and central mixers to break away the dried concrete along the drums’ walls. Human teams use tools such as the handheld jackhammer and chisel to manually remove hardened material. The robotically controlled machine removes the dried concrete by cutting the concrete with ultra high pressure water, causing the concrete to delaminate from the interior of the mixer drum. The robotically controlled machine is operated by a human outside of the ready-mix concrete drum. Human teams, with help from shovels, wheelbarrows and the like, then pile the discarded concrete on the ground, where it can either be hauled away to the landfill, turned into new building material through the process of concrete recycling or repurposed in some other way. Mike Rowe, host of Dirty Jobs on the Discovery Channel, once described concrete chipping as the toughest job he ever took on.

== Maintenance ==
Chipping requirements vary depending on a variety of factors, including the individual cement mixing truck and concrete mixer, the concrete blends in use and crews’ maintenance practices. Still, many concrete chipping companies advise scheduling chipping appointments every three months. Regular chipping helps companies avoid problems such as lowered drum capacity, sluggish machinery and breakdowns which not only grind work to a halt, but result in costly repairs. Even companies which use chemical blends to keep concrete buildup at bay require periodic chipping, though on a slightly extended timeline.

== Safety ==
As opposed to robotically controlled hydro chipping, which has no safety concerns commonly related to the concrete chipping industry, concrete chipping by human teams is inherently dangerous work. Chippers face a number of on-the-job hazards, including but not limited to flying debris, silica dust, electric shock and excessive noise. Confined spaces are another such danger concrete chippers face on the job. Airborne cement dust can also lead to burns, irritation, blindness and life-threatening diseases. Personal Protective Equipment (PPE) helps minimize exposure to dangers tradesmen such as concrete chippers face on the job. This equipment includes, but is not limited to: The hard hat, respirator, eye protection, steel-toe boot and ear protection. The United States Department of Labor’s Occupational Safety and Health Administration (OSHA) also maintains a list of safety tips and requirements to protect workers involved in manufacturing, pouring and chipping concrete. Many companies also require continuing education and regular safety training to ensure both their team members and the clients they serve remain fully protected.
