= Concrete and Constructional Engineering =

UK magazine

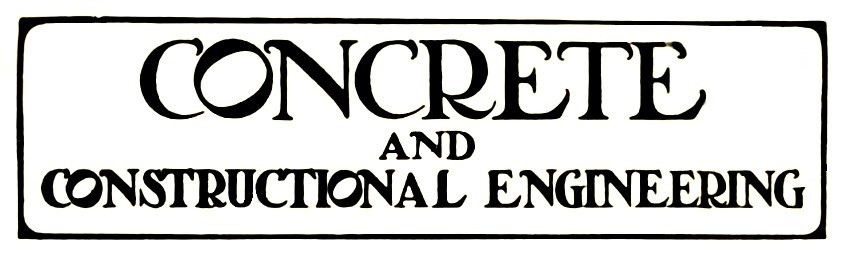
The title of the magazine as it appeared in 1911.

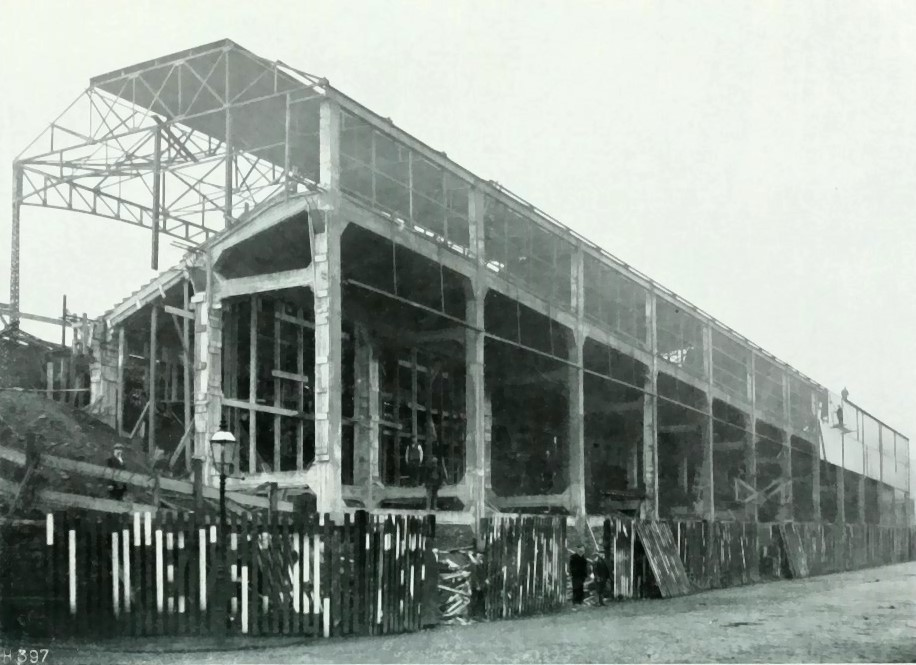
The concrete Midland Road stand for Bradford City Football Club nearing completion in 1908.

Concrete and Constructional Engineering was a magazine published in London, England, by Concrete Publications from 1906 to 1966. The magazine chronicled in its pages the increasing popularity of reinforced concrete as a construction material in the early and mid twentieth centuries.

== History ==
The magazine was founded in 1906 by architect and founder of the Concrete Institute (later The Institution of Structural Engineers), Edwin Sachs. It was described by the publishers as "a bi-monthly journal for engineers, architects and surveyors, contractors and builders, and all workers in cement, concrete, reinforced concrete, and constructional steel." It became monthly in 1910.

== Reception ==
The magazine chronicled in its pages the increasing popularity of reinforced concrete as a construction material in the early and mid twentieth centuries.

An editorial in the January 1910 edition noted that the material was becoming more acceptable to the British government but that some "ultra-conservative members of the technical professions" had been slow to place their confidence in the material.

In addition, the journal complained that "architects of high-standing" were not recommending the material due to prejudices about the appearance of the material in buildings.

== Construction ==
In successes, the journal reported the construction of an all concrete (apart from the roof) football stadium for Bradford City Football Club at their Midland Road (Valley Parade), stadium in 1908, which was required following the promotion of the team to Division One. The architect was Archibald Leitch.

The magazine merged with Structural Concrete to form Concrete (London) and ceased publication in 1966.

== See also ==
- Asphalt concrete
- Concrete chipping
- Concrete densifier
