= Pontcysyllte Aqueduct =

Waterway in Wales

Pontcysyllte Aqueduct Traphont Ddŵr Pontcysyllte
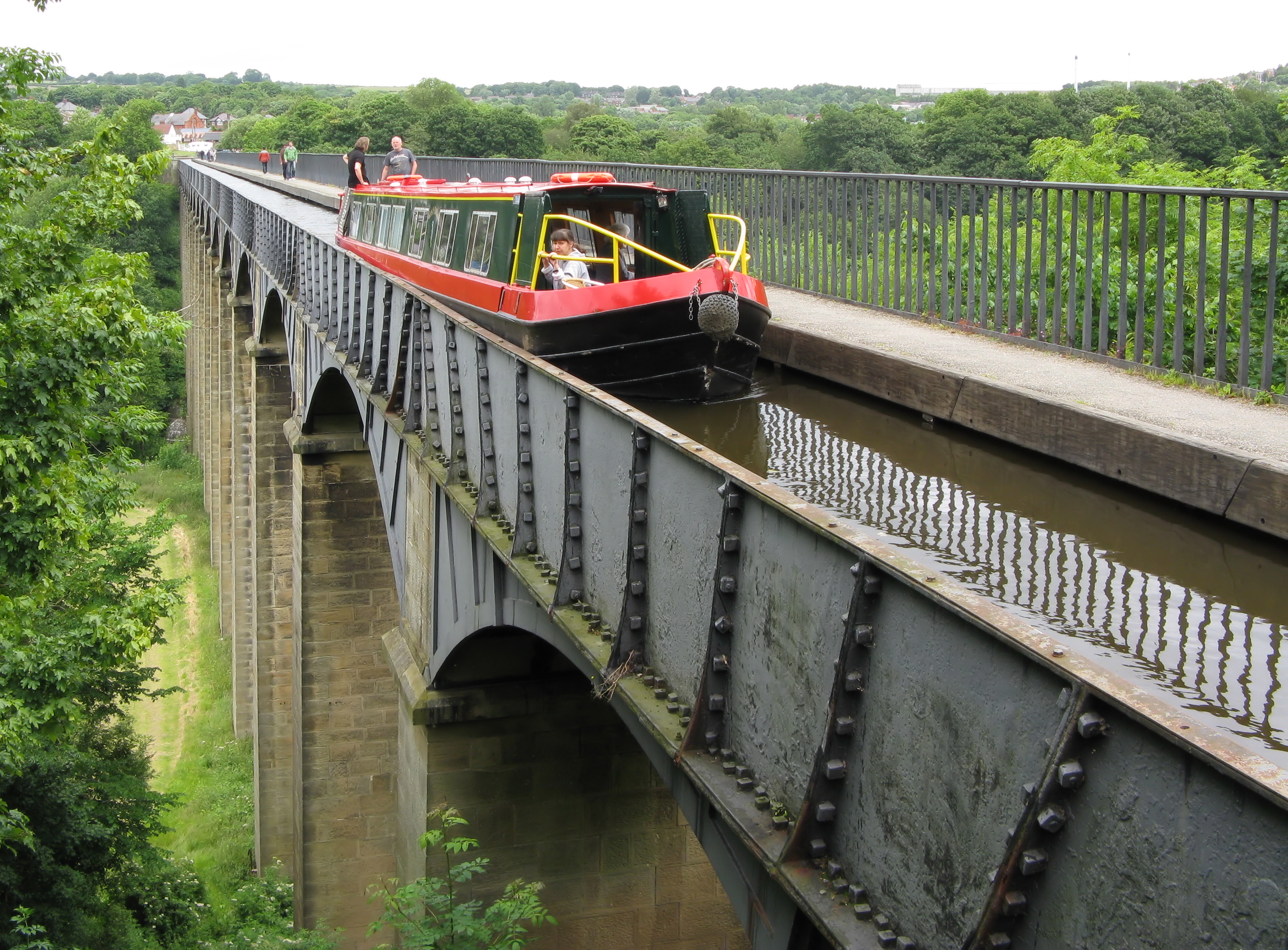
- Coordinates: 52°58′14″N 03°05′16″W
- OS grid reference: SJ270420
- Carries: Llangollen Canal
- Crosses: River Dee
- Locale: Froncysyllte, Wrexham, Wales
- Maintained by: Glandŵr Cymru – the Canal & River Trust
- Heritage status: Grade I listed

Characteristics
- Trough construction: Cast iron
- Pier construction: Stone
- Total length: 336 yd (307 m)
- Width: 11 ft 10 in (3.61 m)
- Height: 127 ft (39 m)
- Water depth: 5 ft 3 in (1.60 m)
- Traversable?: Yes
- Towpaths: East side
- No. of spans: 19
- Piers in water: 4

History
- Designer: Thomas Telford
- Construction start: 25 July 1795
- Opened: 26 November 1805

UNESCO World Heritage Site
- Official name: Pontcysyllte Aqueduct and Canal
- Criteria: Cultural: i, ii, iv
- Reference: 1303
- Inscription: 2009 (33rd Session)
- Area: 105 ha (260 acres)
- Buffer zone: 4,145 ha (10,240 acres)

Location
- Interactive map of Pontcysyllte Aqueduct

The Pontcysyllte Aqueduct (Welsh pronunciation: [ˌpɔntkəˈsəɬtɛ]; Welsh: Traphont Ddŵr Pontcysyllte) is a navigable aqueduct that carries the Llangollen Canal across the River Dee in the Vale of Llangollen in northeast Wales.

The 19-arched stone and cast iron structure is for use by narrowboats and was completed in 1805 having taken ten years to design and build. It is 12 feet (3.7 metres) wide and is the longest aqueduct in Great Britain as well as the highest canal aqueduct in the world. A towpath runs alongside the watercourse on one side.

The aqueduct was to have been a key part of the central section of the proposed Ellesmere Canal, an industrial waterway that would have created a commercial link between the River Severn at Shrewsbury and the Port of Liverpool on the River Mersey. Although a less expensive construction course was surveyed further to the east, the westerly high-ground route across the Vale of Llangollen was preferred because it would have taken the canal through the mineral-rich coalfields of North East Wales. Only parts of the canal route were completed because the expected revenues required to complete the entire project were never generated. Most major work ceased after the completion of the Pontcysyllte Aqueduct in 1805.

The structure is a Grade I listed building and part of a UNESCO World Heritage Site.

== Etymology ==
The name Pontcysyllte is Welsh for "Cysyllte Bridge" or "Bridge of Cysyllte", Cysyllte being the township of the old parish of Llangollen in which the southern end of the bridge lies. The northern end of the bridge was in Trefor Isaf township, also in Llangollen parish.

Other translations such as "bridge of the junction" or "bridge that links" are modern false etymologies, derived from the name's apparent similarity to the word cysylltau (plural of cyswllt) which means connections or links.

== History ==
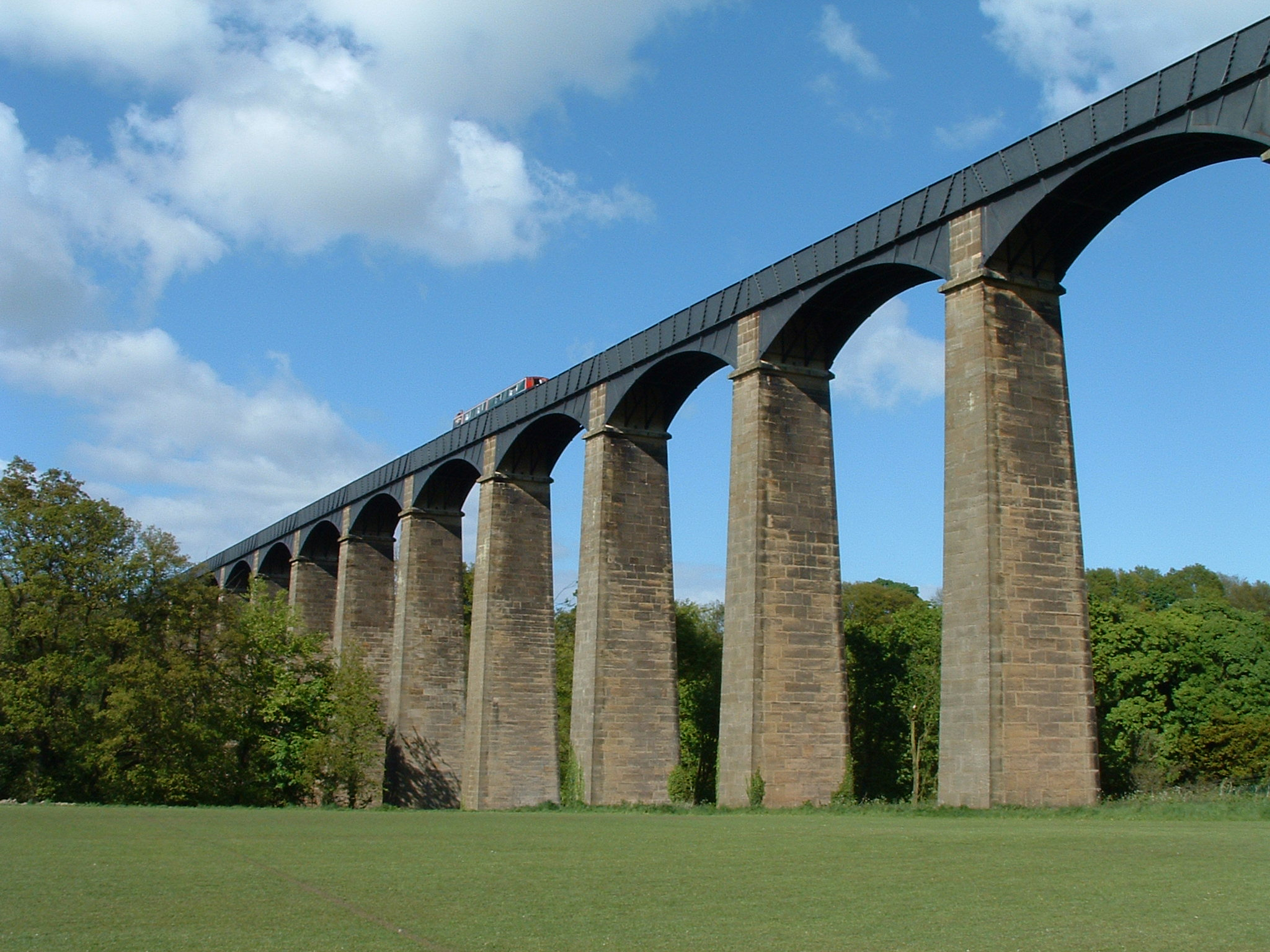
The aqueduct viewed from the valley below

The aqueduct was designed by civil engineers Thomas Telford and William Jessop for a location near an 18th-century road crossing, Pont Cysyllte. After the westerly high-ground route was approved, the original plan was to create a series of locks down both sides of the valley to an embankment that would carry the Ellesmere Canal over the River Dee. After Telford was hired the plan was changed to an aqueduct that would create an uninterrupted waterway straight across the valley. Despite considerable public scepticism, Telford was confident his construction method would work because he had previously built a cast-iron trough aqueduct – the Longdon-on-Tern Aqueduct on the Shrewsbury Canal.

The aqueduct was one of the first major feats of civil engineering undertaken by Telford, who was becoming one of Britain's leading industrial civil engineers; although his work was supervised by Jessop, the more experienced canal engineer. Ironwork was supplied by William Hazledine from his foundries at Shrewsbury and nearby Cefn Mawr. The work, which took around ten years from design to construction, cost around of £47,000. Adjusted for inflation this is equivalent to no more than £3,510,000 in 2025, but represented a major investment against the contemporary GDP of some £400 million.

The Pontcysyllte aqueduct officially opened to traffic on 26 November 1805. A plaque commemorating its inauguration reads:

The nobility and gentry, the adjacent Counties having united their efforts with the great commercial interests of this country. In creating an intercourse and union between England and North Wales by a navigable communication of the three Rivers, Severne [sic] Dee and Mersey for the mutual benefit of agriculture and trades, caused the first stone of this aqueduct of Pontcysyllty [sic], to be laid on the 25th day of July MDCCXCV [1795]. When Richard Myddelton of Chirk, Esq, M.P. one of the original patrons of the Ellesmere Canal was Lord of this manor, and in the reign of our Sovereign George the Third. When the equity of the laws, and the security of property, promoted the general welfare of the nation. While the arts and sciences flourished by his patronage and the conduct of civil life was improved by his example.

The bridge is 336 yd (307 m) long, 11 ft 10 in (3.61 m) wide and 5 ft 3 in (1.60 m) deep. It consists of a cast iron trough supported 127 ft (39 m) above the river on iron arched ribs carried on eighteen hollow masonry piers (pillars). Each of the 19 spans is 13,6 m wide. With the completion of the aqueduct, the next phase of the canal should have been the continuation of the line to Moss Valley, Wrexham where Telford had constructed a feeder reservoir lake in 1796. This would provide the water for the length of canal between Trevor Basin and Chester. The plan to build this section was cancelled in 1798, and the isolated feeder and a stretch of navigation between Ffrwd and a basin in Summerhill was abandoned. Remnants of the feeder channel are visible in Gwersyllt. A street in the village is still named Heol Camlas (Welsh for 'canal way'). The physical construction was undertaken by John Simpson (d.1815) of Shrewsbury.

With the project incomplete, Trevor Basin just over the Pontcysyllte aqueduct would become the canal's northern terminus. In 1808 a feeder channel to bring water from the River Dee near Llangollen was completed. In order to maintain a continual supply, Telford built an artificial weir known as the Horseshoe Falls near Llantysilio to maintain water height.

Subsequently, the Plas Kynaston Canal was built to serve industry in the Cefn Mawr and Rhosymedre areas in the 1820s. There might have been another canal extension ("Ward's") but detailed records do not survive. Goods traffic was brought down to the canal by the Ruabon Brook Tramway which climbed towards Acrefair and Plas Bennion. This railway was eventually upgraded to steam operation and extended towards Rhosllannerchrugog and Wrexham.

In 1844, the Ellesmere and Chester Canal Company, which owned the broad canals from Ellesmere Port to Chester and from Chester to Nantwich, with a branch to Middlewich, began discussions with the narrow Birmingham and Liverpool Junction Canal, which ran from Nantwich to Autherley, where it joined the Staffordshire and Worcestershire Canal. The two companies had always worked together, in a bid to maintain their profits against competition from the railways, and amalgamation seemed to be a logical step. An agreement was worked out by August, and the two companies then sought an act of Parliament to authorise the takeover. This was granted as the Ellesmere and Chester Canal Company Act 1845 (8 & 9 Vict. c. ii) on 8 May 1845, when the larger Ellesmere and Chester Canal Company was formed.

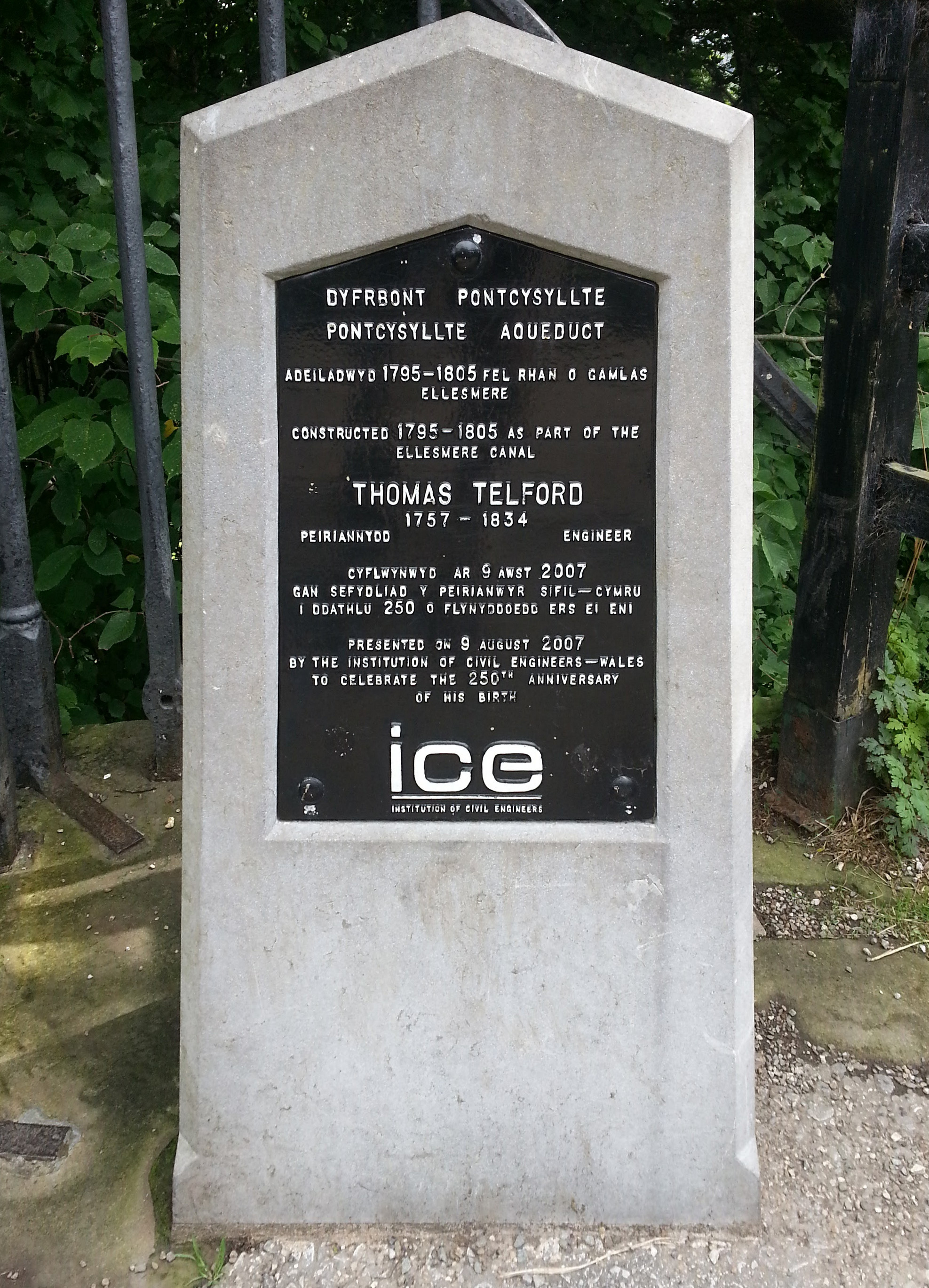
Plaque commemorating the construction of the Pontcysyllte Aqueduct between 1795 and 1805 by Thomas Telford

In 1846, the canal and the aqueduct became part of the Shropshire Union Railways and Canal Company. But the intent of the merger was to build railways at a reduced cost, by using the existing routes of the canals they owned. By 1849, the plan to turn canals into railways had been dropped. As the aqueduct was largely in an area that was served by railways owned by the Great Western Railway, the London and North Western Railway was more than happy for the canal to remain open as long as it remained profitable. With the start of the First World War in 1914, the Shropshire Union – of which the Pontcysyllte aqueduct was a part – served the war effort with its fleet of more than 450 narrow boats.

Commercial traffic on the canal greatly declined after a waterway breach near Newtown, Powys (now part of the Montgomery Canal) in 1936. By 1939 boat movements across the aqueduct to Llangollen had ceased. The canal was formally closed to navigation under the London Midland and Scottish Railway (Canals) Act 1944 (8 & 9 Geo. 6. c. ii)). On 6 September 1945, due to inadequate maintenance, the canal breached its banks east of Llangollen near Sun Bank Halt. The flow of hundreds of tons of water washed away the embankment of the railway further down the hill, tearing a 40-yard (37 m) crater 50 feet (15 m) deep. This caused the first traffic of the morning, a mail and goods train composed of 16 carriages and two vans, to crash into the breach, killing one and injuring two engine crew.

The aqueduct was saved (despite its official closure to waterway traffic) because it was still required as a water feeder for the remainder of the Shropshire Union Canal. The aqueduct also supplied drinking water to a reservoir at Hurleston. In 1955 the Mid and South-East Cheshire Water Board agreed to maintain the canal securing its future.

In the latter half of the 20th century, leisure boating traffic began to rise. In a rebranding exercise by British Waterways in the 1980s, the former industrial waterway was renamed the Llangollen Canal. It has since become one of the most popular canals for holidaymakers in Britain because of its aqueducts and scenery. The Pontcysyllte Aqueduct is now maintained and managed by the Canal & River Trust (branded Glandŵr Cymru in Wales). Otters have been seen in the area.

== Construction and maintenance ==
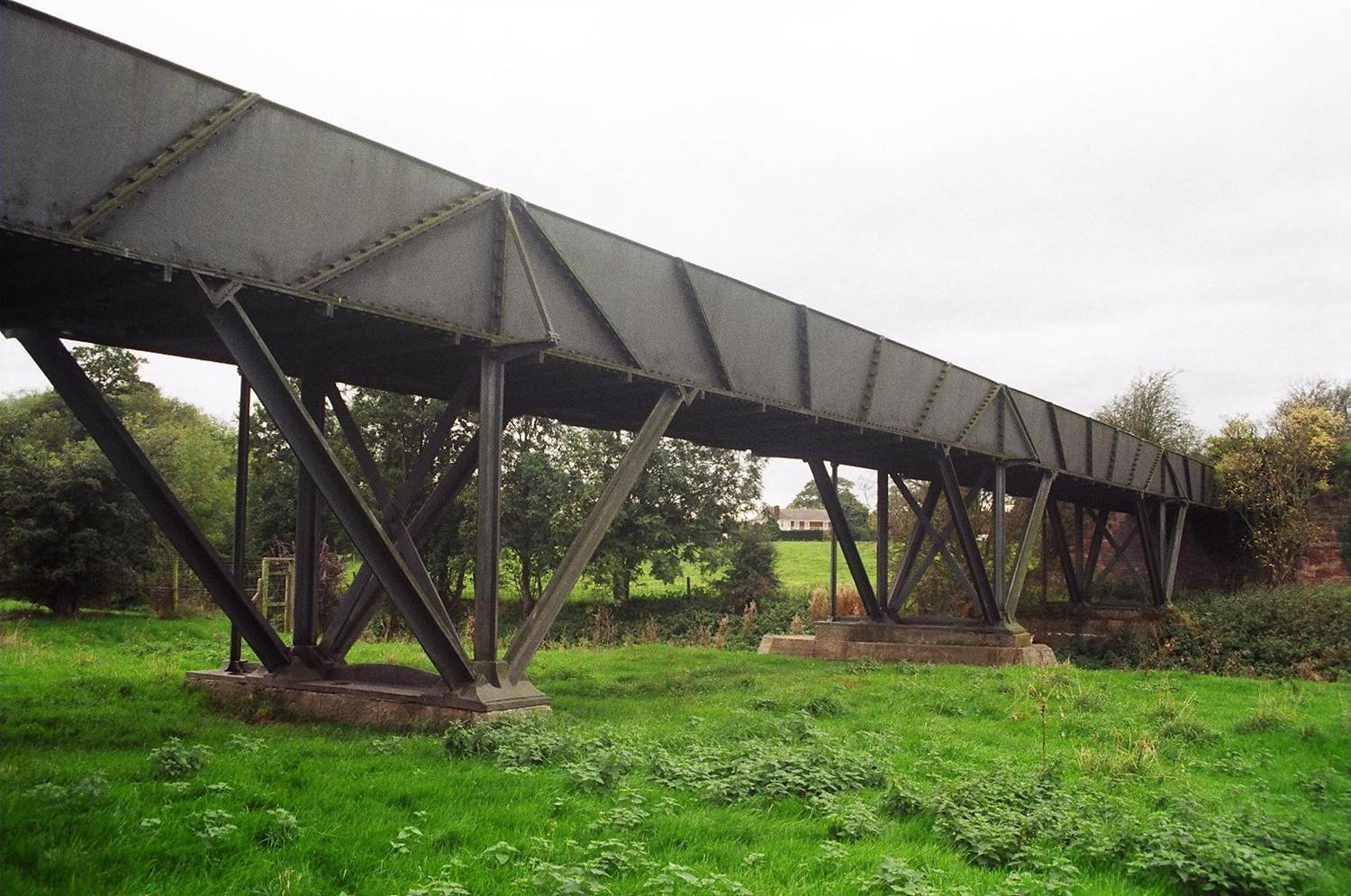
Thomas Telford designed and built the Pontcysyllte aqueduct using the experience he gained from building Longdon-on-Tern Aqueduct on the Shrewsbury Canal

The mortar used lime, water and ox blood. Blood and extracts of blood containing haemoglobin have been used in the construction and building industry since antiquity as air entraining colloids to inexpensively strengthen mortar exposed to freeze-thaw temperature cycles.

The iron castings for the trough were produced at the nearby Plas Kynaston Foundry, Cefn Mawr, which was built by the Shrewsbury ironfounder and millwright William Hazledine in the hope of gaining the contract. The rib castings may have been made at Hazledine's original works at Coleham, near Shrewsbury. The trough was made from flanged plates of cast iron, bolted together, with the joints bedded with Welsh flannel and a mixture of white lead and iron particles from boring waste.

After 25 years the white lead was replaced with ordinary tar. As with Telford's Longdon-on-Tern Aqueduct, the plates are not rectangular but shaped as voussoirs, similar to those of a stone arch. There is no structural significance to their shape: it is a decorative feature only, following the lines of the stiffening plates (see below) in the castings beneath.

In nearby Cefn Mawr a high quartz content sandstone was discovered at the location where the new Cefn Druids football stadium has since been built. Known locally as 'The Rock', the sandstone was extracted and worked here into the many numerous shapes as required by the engineers. Many remnants of the workings are still visible alongside Rock Road which links Rhosymedre to Plas Madoc.

The supporting arches, four for each span, are in the form of cast-iron ribs, each cast as three voussoirs with external arches cast with an un-pierced web to give greater strength, at the cost of extra weight. Using cast iron in this way, in the same manner as the stone arch it supersedes, makes use of the material's strength in compression. They also give an impression of greater solidity than would be the case were the webs pierced. This impression is enhanced by the arrangement of strips of thicker stiffening incorporated into the castings, arranged in the manner of joints between voussoirs.

Cast plates are laid transversely to form the bed of the canal trough. The trough is not fastened to the arches, but lugs are cast into the plates to fit over the rib arches to prevent movement. The aqueduct was left for six months with water inside to check that it was watertight. A feature of a canal aqueduct, in contrast with a road or railway viaduct, is that the vertical loading stresses are virtually constant. According to Archimedes' principle, the mass (weight) of a boat and its cargo on the bridge pushes an equal mass of water off the bridge.

The towpath is mounted above the water, with the inner edge carried on cast-iron pillars in the trough. This arrangement allows the water displaced by the passage of a narrowboat to flow easily under the towpath and around the boat, enabling relatively free passage. In 1831, the original wooden towpath was replaced with an iron structure cantilevered off the side of the trough but, contrary to some texts, the 12 ft (3.7 m) wide trough, extending under the towpath to allow water displacement, remains as originally built. Pedestrians, and the horses once used for towing, are protected from falling from the aqueduct by railings on the outside edge of the towpath, but the holes in the top flange of the other side of the trough, capable of mounting railings, were never used. The trough sides rise only about 6 inches (15 cm) above the water level, less than the depth of freeboard of an empty narrow boat, so the helmsman of the boat has no visual protection from the impression of being at the edge of an abyss. The trough of the Cosgrove aqueduct has a similar structure, although it rests on trestles rather than iron arches. It is also less impressively high.

Every five years the ends of the aqueduct are closed and a plug in one of the highest spans is opened to drain the canal water into the River Dee below, to allow inspection and maintenance of the trough.

The aqueduct was most recently closed for maintenance in mid 2024 and maintenance will be resuming in January 2025 with a further full closure of the aqueduct until mid-March.

== World Heritage Site ==
The aqueduct and surrounding lands were submitted to the "tentative list" of properties being considered for UNESCO World Heritage Site status in 1999. The aqueduct was suggested as a contender in 2005—its 200th anniversary year—and it was formally announced in 2006 that a larger proposal, covering a section of the canal from the aqueduct to Horseshoe Falls would be the United Kingdom's 2008 nomination.

The length of canal from Rhoswiel, Shropshire, to the Horseshoe Falls, including the main Pontcysyllte Aqueduct structure as well as the older Chirk Aqueduct, were visited by assessors from UNESCO during October 2008, to analyse and confirm the site management and authenticity. The aqueduct was inscribed by UNESCO on the World Heritage List on 27 June 2009.

== Gallery ==
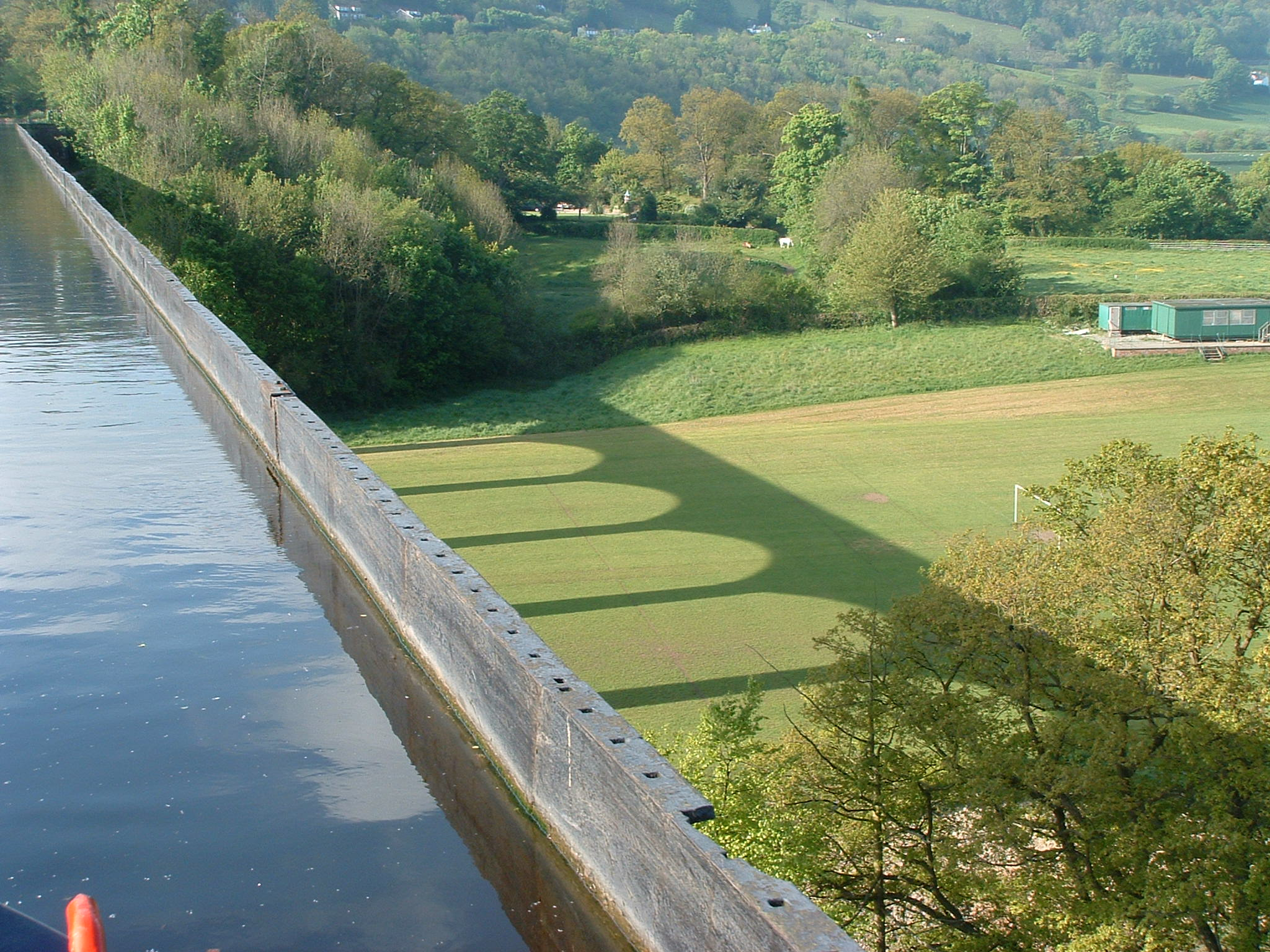
A view of the Dee Valley from the aqueduct

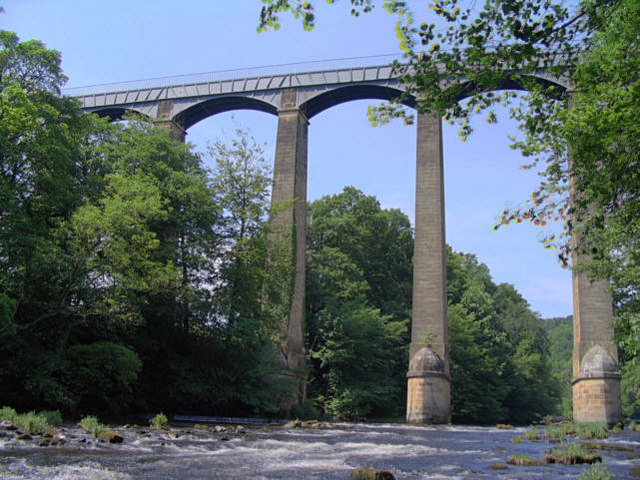
From the river and valley

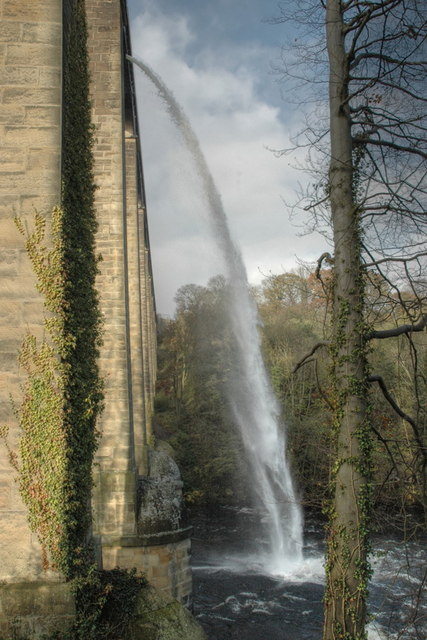
The canal being drained for inspection and maintenance (2009)

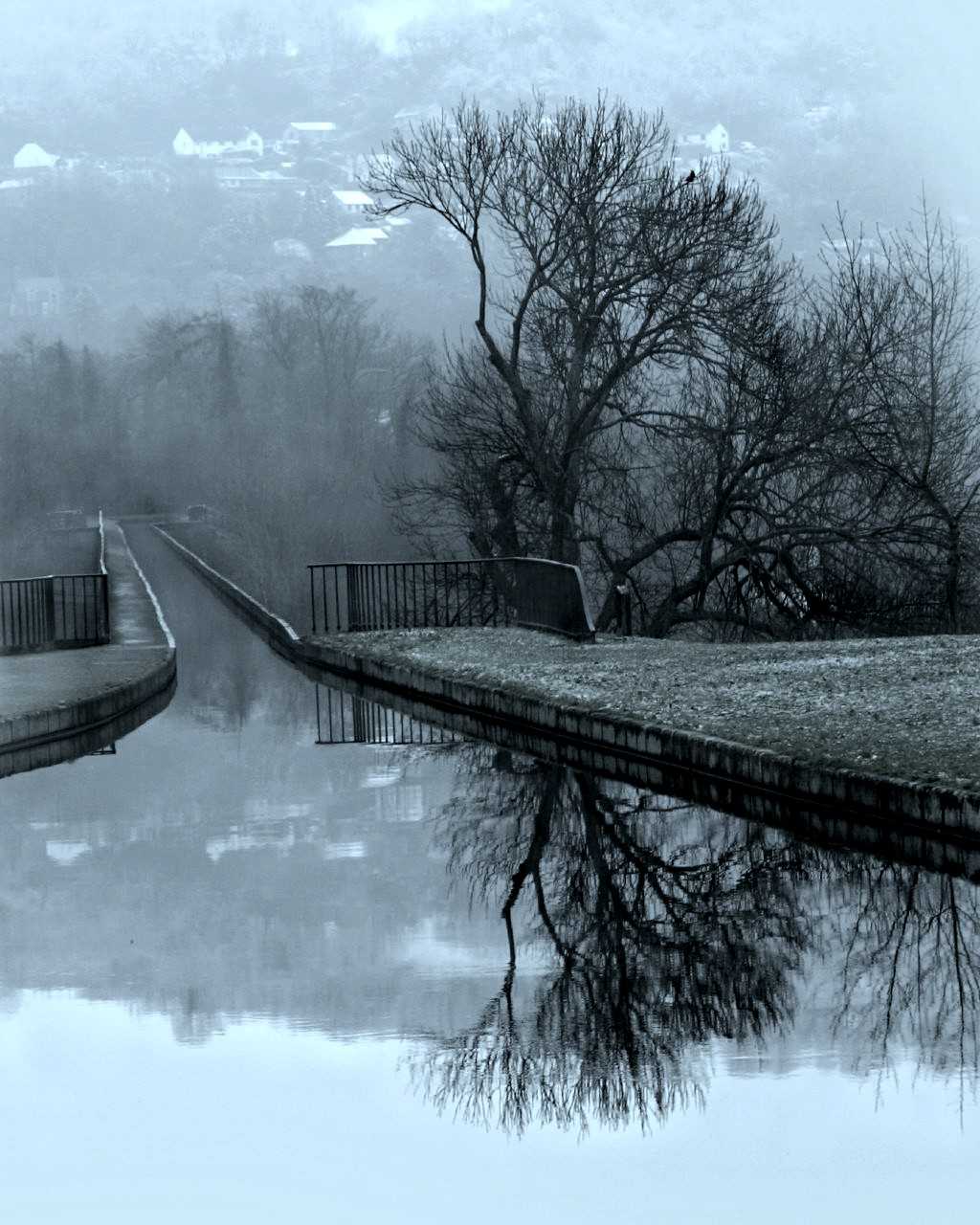
Pontcysyllte Aqueduct in Winter

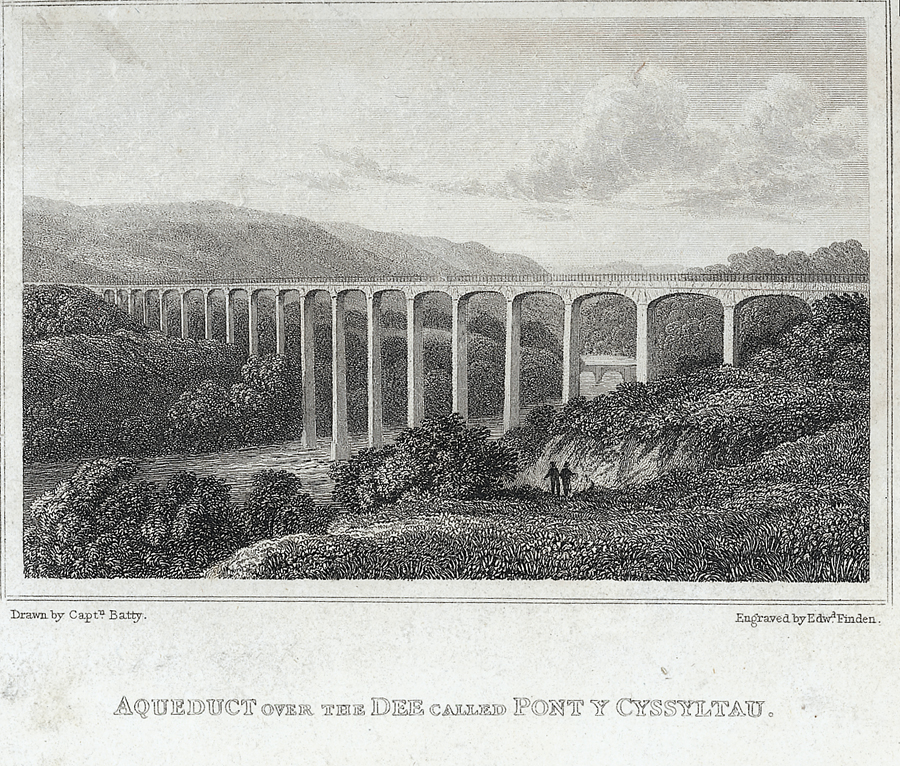

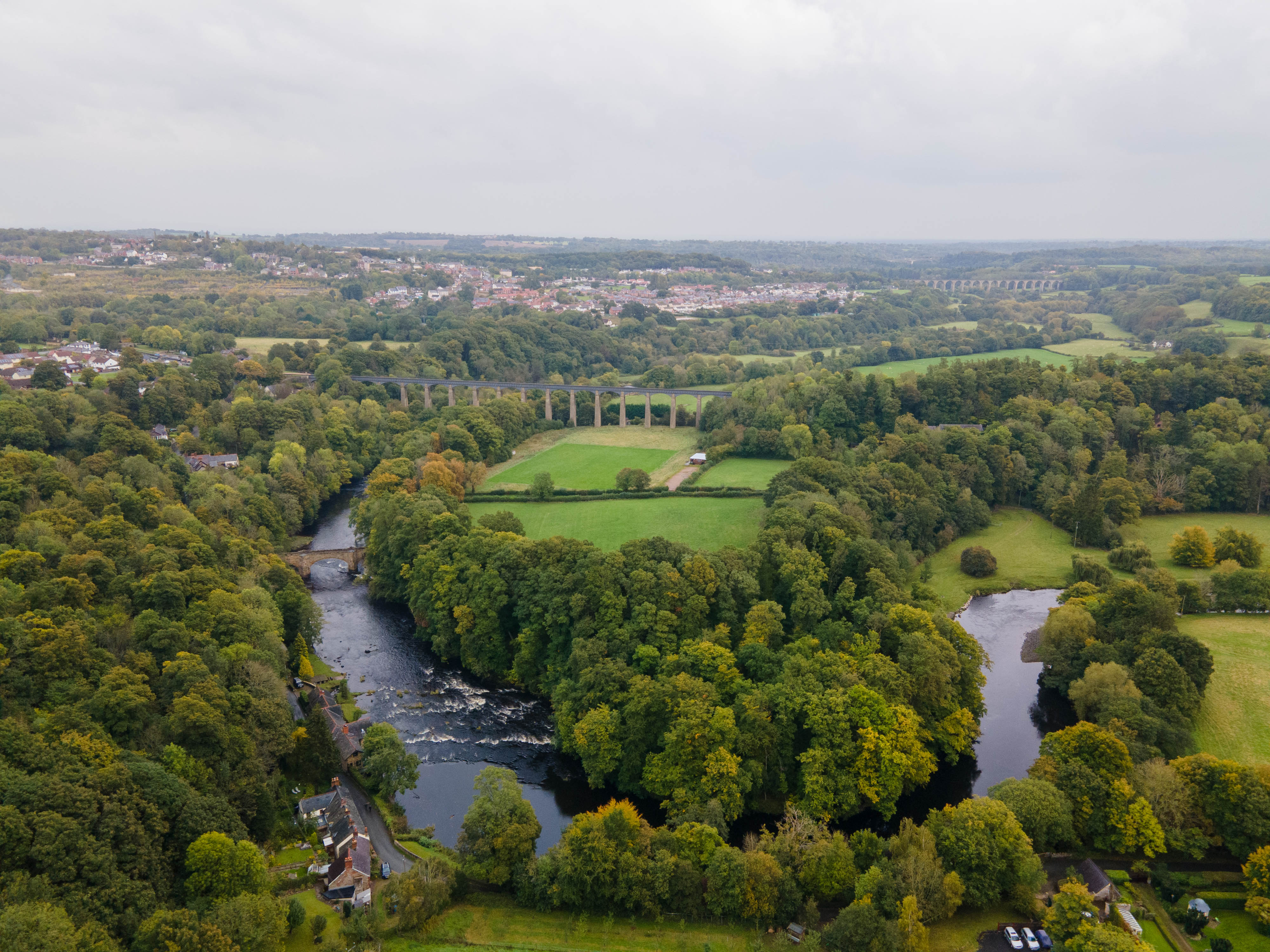
Aqueduct viewed with Pont Cysyllte bridge and Cefn Mawr Viaduct

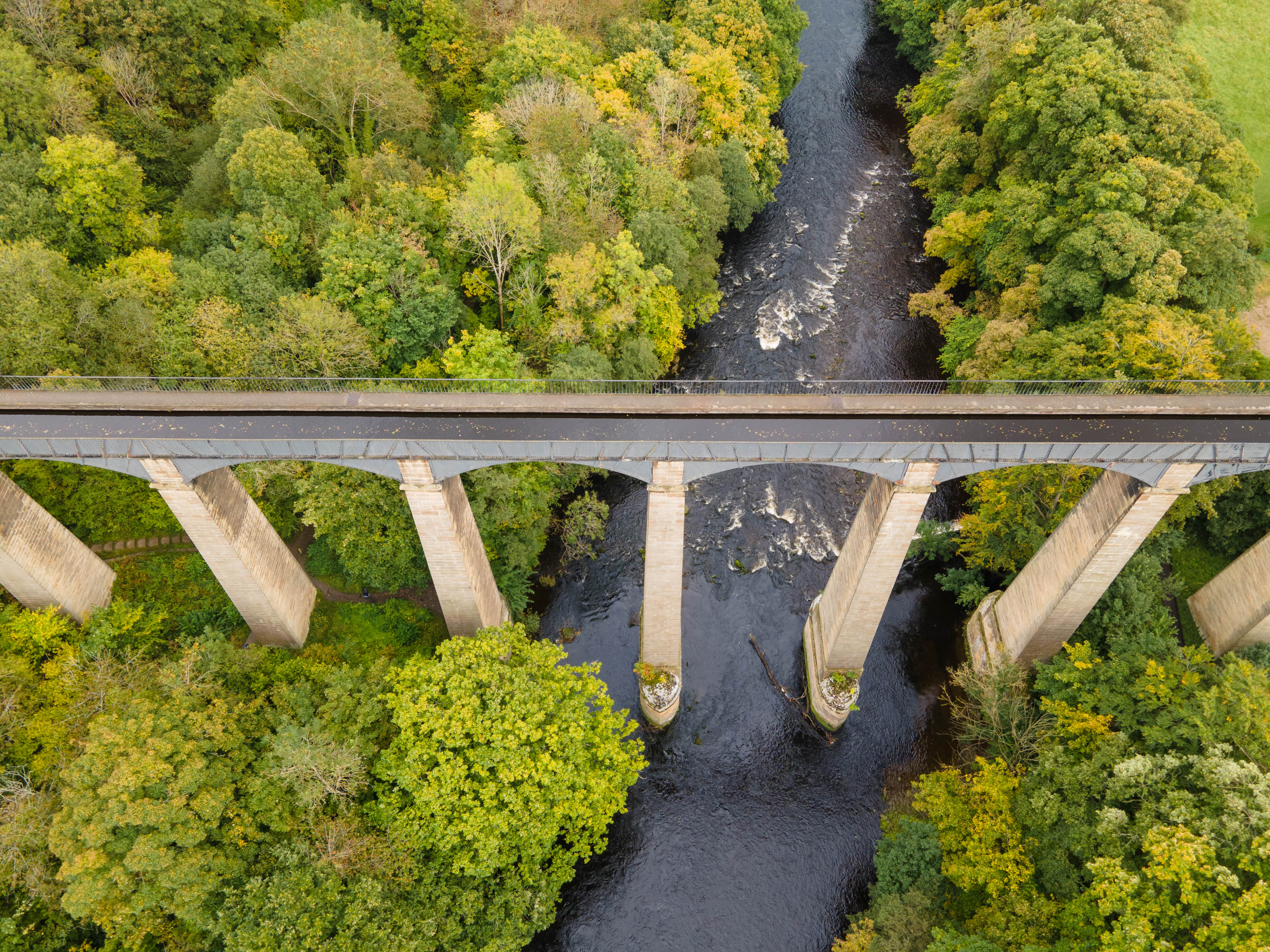
Aerial view

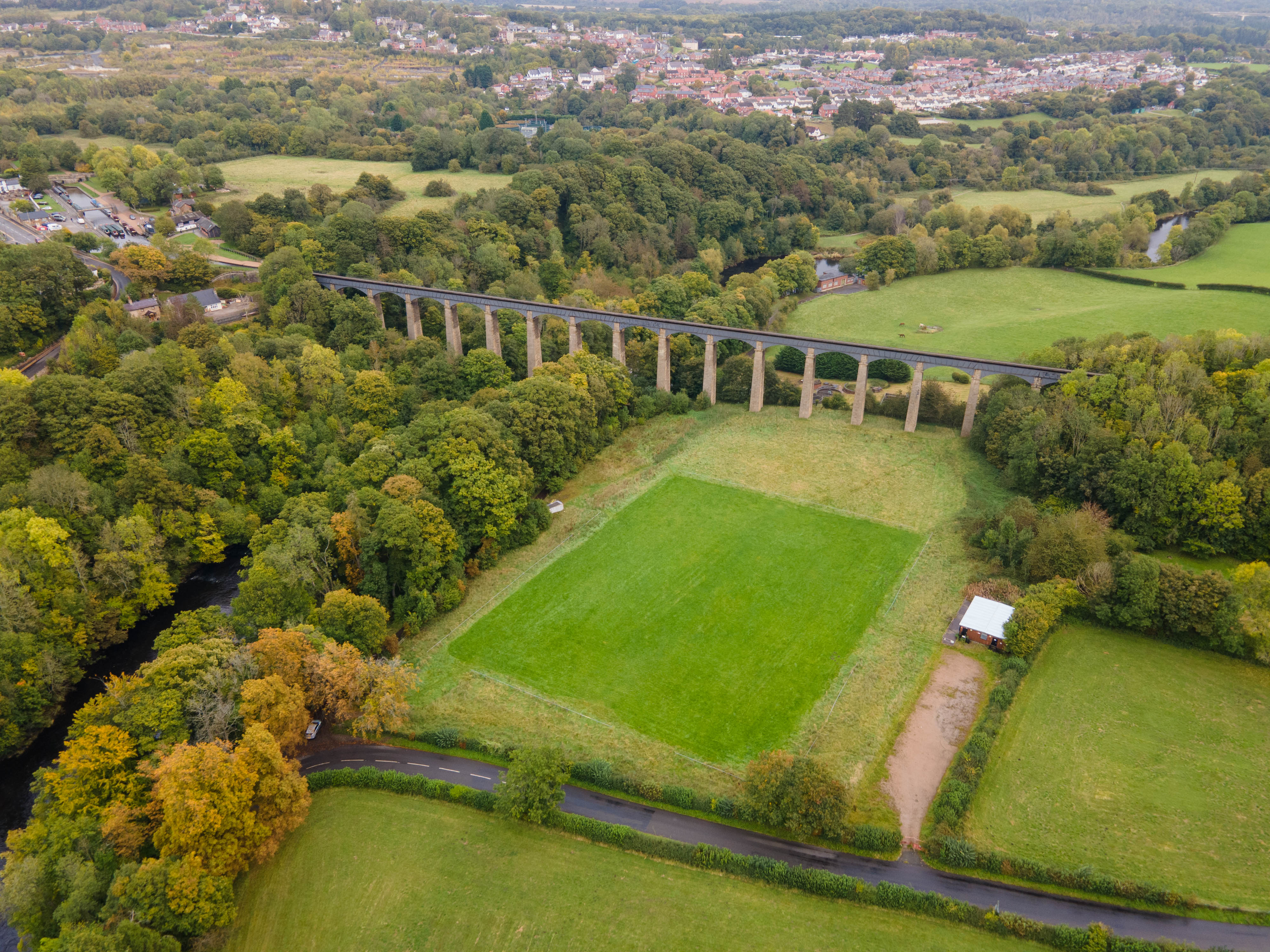
Aerial view showing football ground and Cefn Mawr

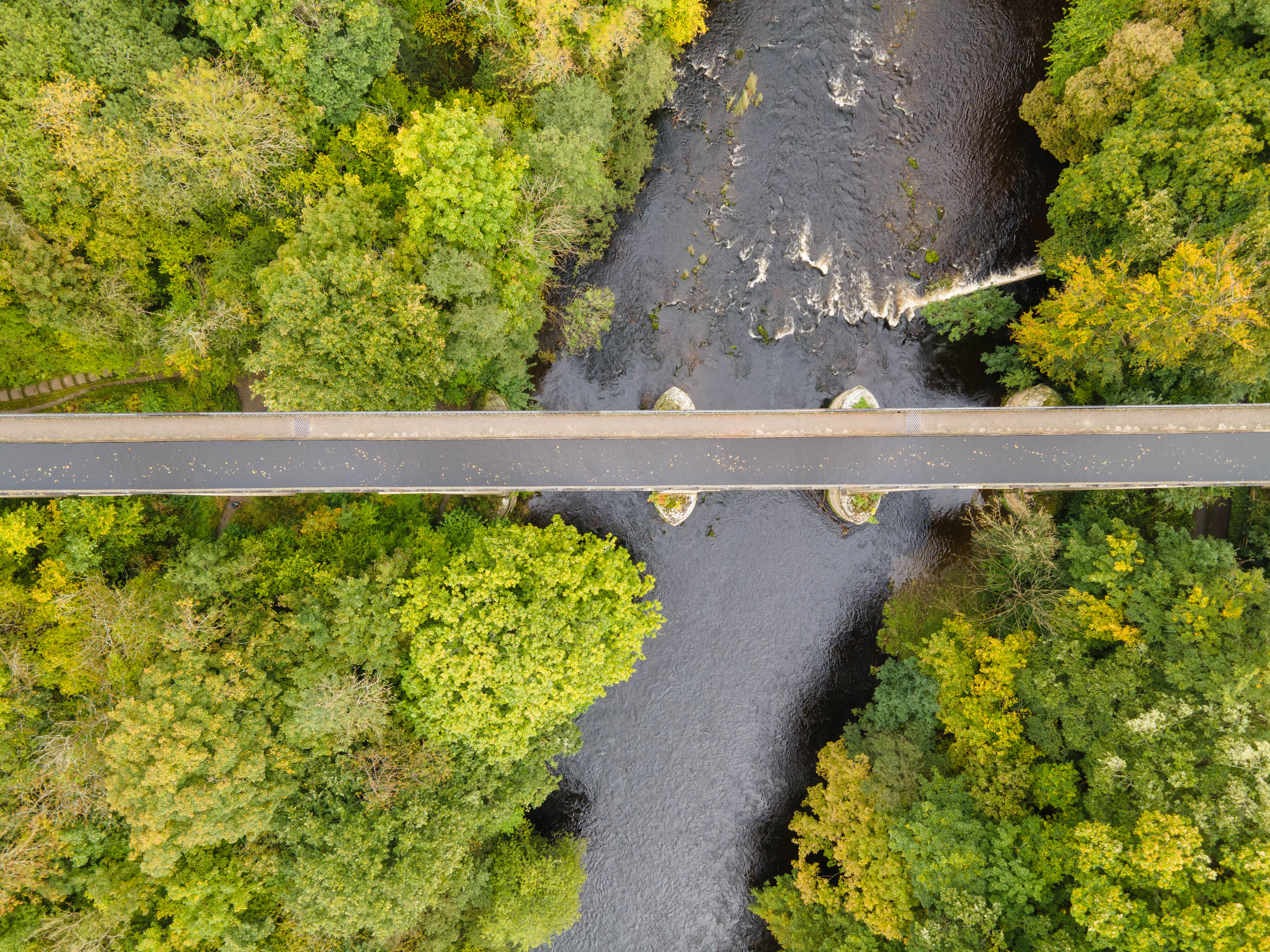
Aerial view

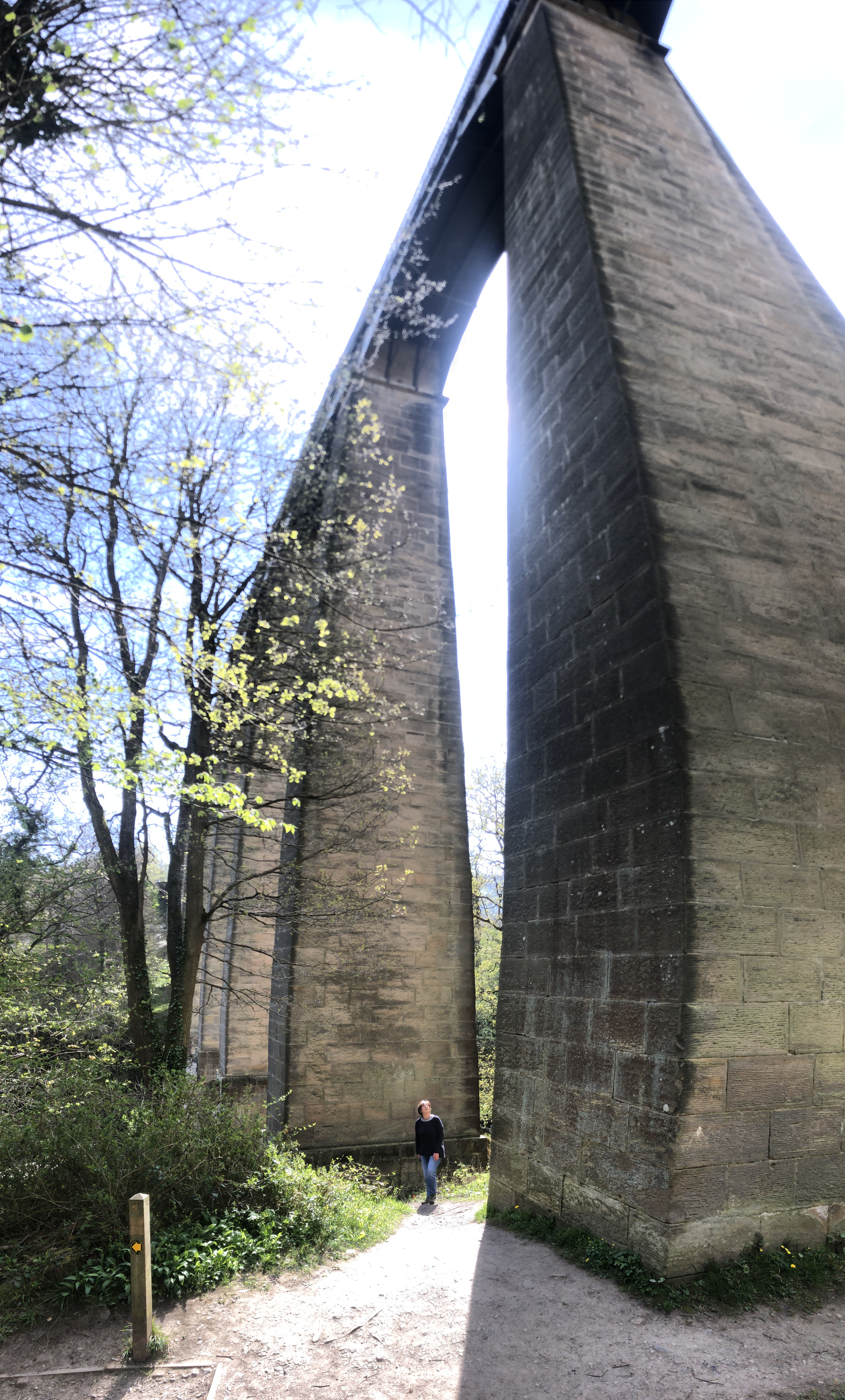
Pontcysyllte Aqueduct viewed from below at its northern end

== See also ==
- Canals of the United Kingdom
- List of canal aqueducts in Great Britain
- List of bridges in Wales
- List of Scheduled Monuments in Wrexham
- Archaeology of Wales

== Bibliography ==
- Hadfield, Charles (1985). The Canals of the West Midlands. David and Charles. ISBN 978-0-7153-8644-6.
