= Horseshoe Falls (Wales) =

Waterfall near Llangollen, Wales

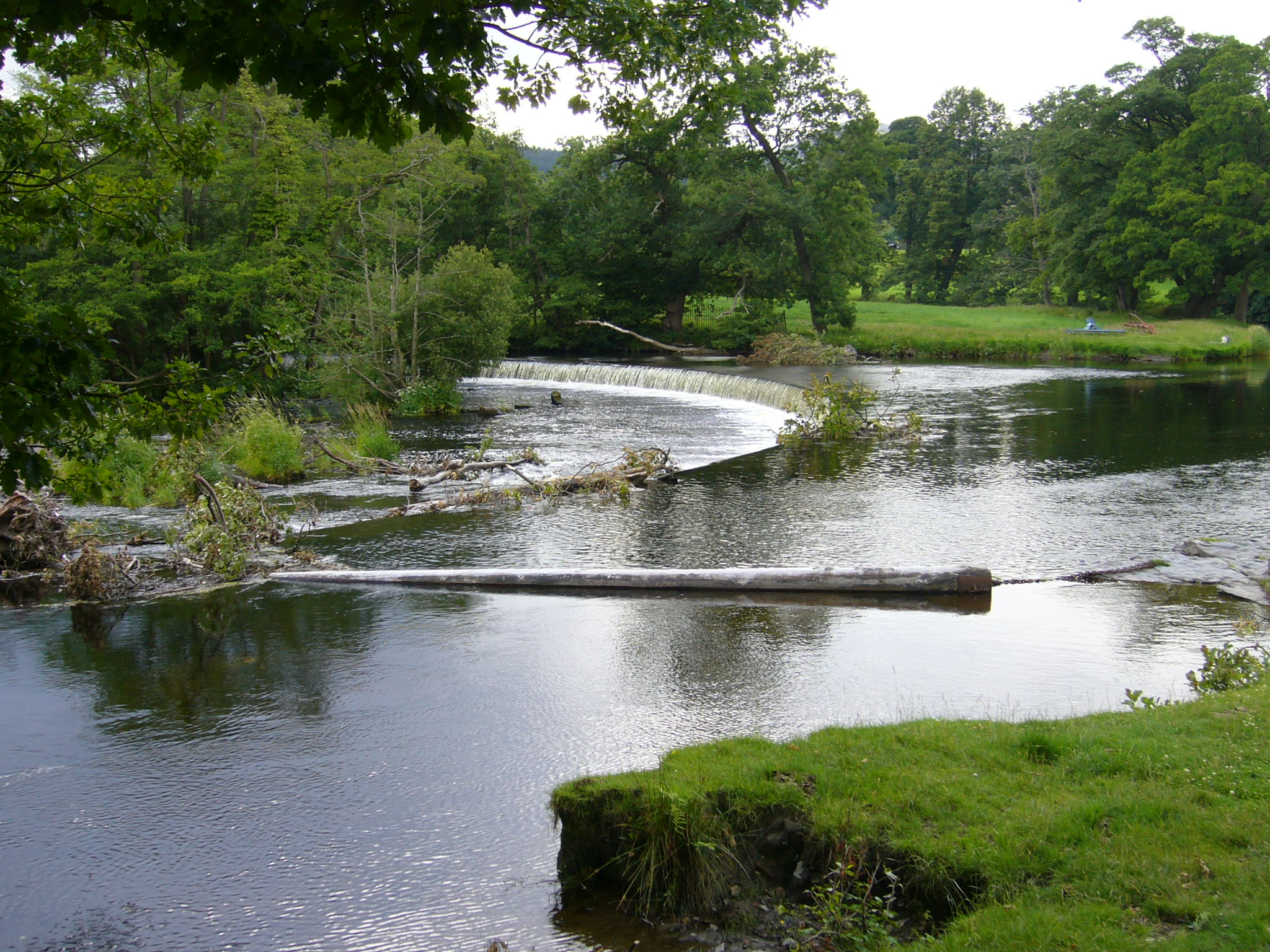
- Horseshoe Falls

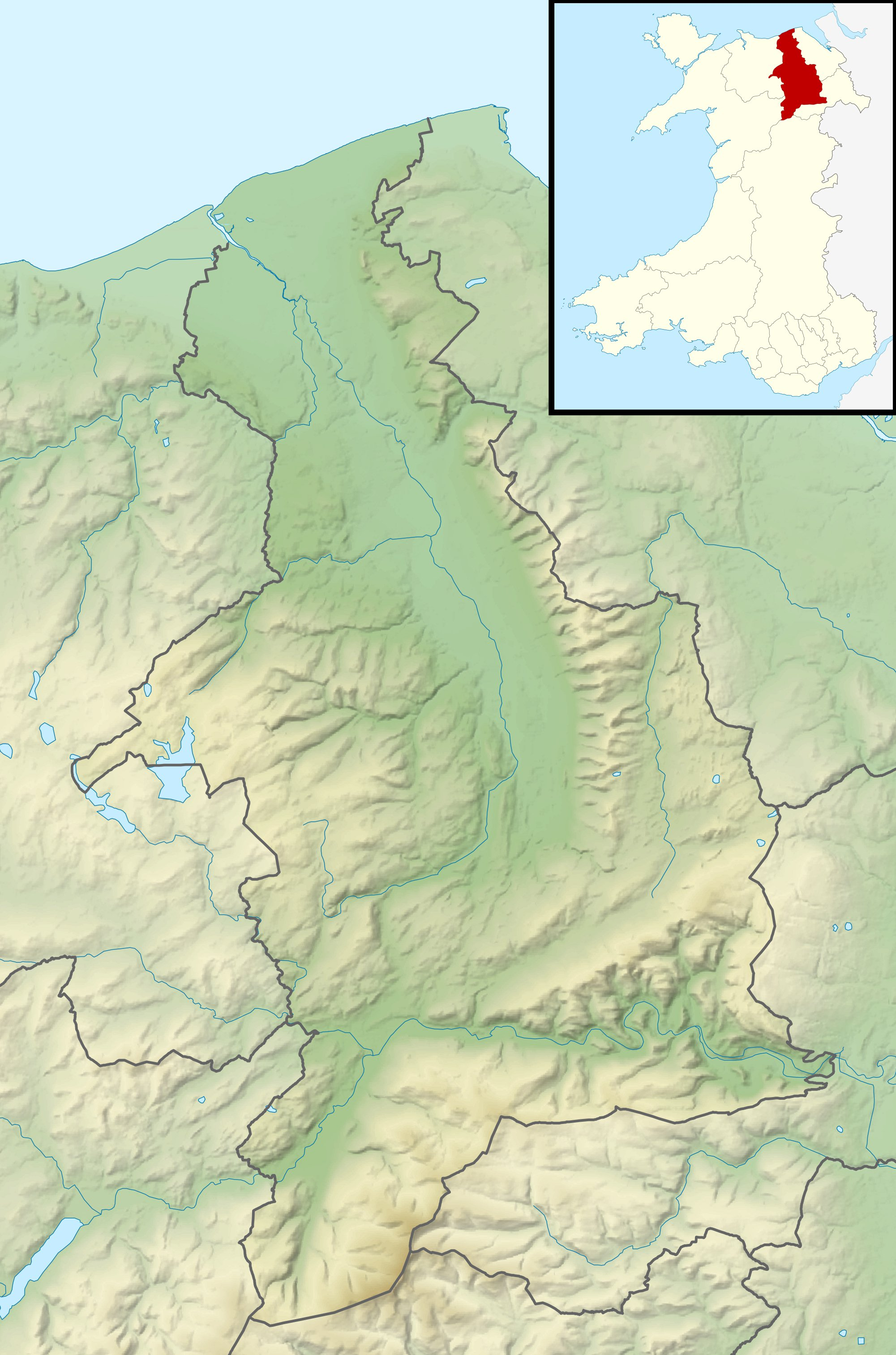
- Location within Denbighshire
- Location: About 3 miles (4.8 km) west of Llangollen
- OS grid: SJ195433
- Coordinates: 52.98111°N 3.19917°W
- Type: artificial
- Elevation: 330 ft (100 m)
- Watercourse: River Dee
- Average flow rate: 13.7 M gals per day (62 Mld)

Horseshoe Falls (Welsh: Rhaeadr y Bedol) (grid reference SJ196433) is a weir on the River Dee near Llantysilio Hall in Denbighshire, Wales, about 5 kilometres (3 mi) north-west of the town of Llangollen. The Falls are a short walk from Berwyn railway station on the preserved Llangollen Railway.

== History ==
The distinctively shaped weir, which is 460 feet (140 m) long, helps create a pool of water that can enter the Llangollen Canal (via an adjacent valve house and flow meter). The canal west of Pontcysyllte Aqueduct and the construction of the weir were authorised by an act of Parliament, the Ellesmere Canal, Railway and Water Supply Act 1804 (44 Geo. 3. c. liv), obtained by the Ellesmere Canal Company. The canal was a navigable feeder, which supplied water to the Ellesmere Canal beyond Pontcysyllte, and to the Chester Canal, to which it connected near Nantwich. Thomas Telford was the civil engineer responsible for the design, and the canal and feeder were completed in 1808.

The weir was an important factor in the retention of the canal to Llangollen when the owners of the entire Shropshire Union system, the London, Midland and Scottish Railway, decided to close much of the network in 1944. They retained the line of the former Chester Canal and the Ellesmere Canal from Nantwich to Ellesmere Port, the branch of the Chester Canal to Middlewich and the former Birmingham and Liverpool Junction Canal main line from Nantwich to Wolverhampton. Because Horseshoe Falls was a major source of water to that system, the canal from Llangollen to Nantwich, including the great aqueducts at Pontcysyllte and Chirk, was retained purely as a water supply channel. This action enabled the canal to survive until it was taken over by British Waterways following nationalisation in 1948. With the steady decline in commercial traffic, British Waterways negotiated with the Mid and South-East Cheshire Water Board, and the canal is used to transfer water from the Dee at Llantysilio to a reservoir near Hurleston Junction, to the north of Nantwich. In 2009, some 13.7 million imperial gallons (62 Ml) per day was conveyed along the canal. Under British Waterways, the canal has become one of the most popular cruising canals in the country. The final 1.7 miles (2.7 km) from Llangollen to the falls is not navigable by motorised boats, as it is not wide enough for vessels to turn round, but the towpath extends along the bank right up to the falls.

Since 2009, the weir has been part of a World Heritage Site, which covers 11 miles (18 km) of the Llangollen Canal from just west of Horseshoe Falls to just beyond Chirk Aqueduct. The canal was awarded World Heritage status because of the bold civil engineering solutions needed to construct a canal with no locks through such difficult terrain.

== See also ==
- Canals of the United Kingdom
- History of the British canal system
- List of waterfalls in Wales

== Bibliography ==
- Cragg, Roger (1997). Civil Engineering Heritage: Wales and West Central England, 2nd Edition. Thomas Telford. ISBN 0-7277-2576-9.
- Cumberlidge, Jane (2009). Inland Waterways of Great Britain (8th Ed). Imray Laurie Norie and Wilson. ISBN 978-1-84623-010-3.
- Hadfield, Charles (1985). The Canals of the West Midlands. David and Charles. ISBN 0-7153-8644-1.
- Nicholson (2006). Nicholson Guides Vol 4: Four Counties & the Welsh Canals. Harper Collins. ISBN 978-0-00-721112-8.
