= Froncysyllte =

Village in Wrexham County Borough, Wales

Coordinates: 52.963°N 3.083°W

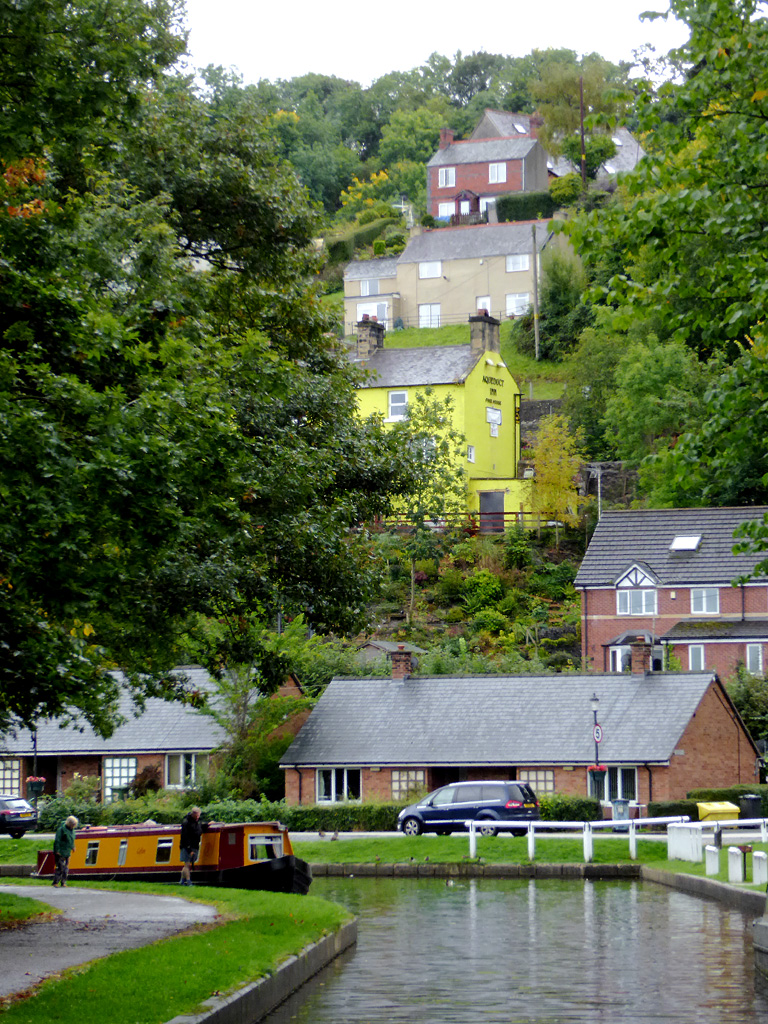
- The Llangollen Canal in the village

- Location within Wrexham
- Population: 606
- OS grid reference: SJ273411
- Community: Llangollen Rural
- Principal area: Wrexham
- Preserved county: Clwyd
- Country: Wales
- Sovereign state: United Kingdom
- Post town: LLANGOLLEN
- Postcode district: LL20
- Dialling code: 01691
- Police: North Wales
- Fire: North Wales
- Ambulance: Welsh
- UK Parliament: Clwyd South
- Senedd Cymru – Welsh Parliament: Clwyd South

Froncysyllte (/ˌvrɒŋkəˈsʌlteɪ/; Welsh pronunciation: [vrɔŋkəˈsəɬte]), colloquially known as Fron, is a village in Wrexham County Borough, Wales and stands on the banks of the River Dee and the Llangollen Canal. It is situated on the main A5 road which runs from London to Holyhead. It is in the community of Llangollen Rural. The population was 606 as of 2011 UK census.

The name is derived from the Welsh bron (here lenited to fron), here meaning a hill breast, along with the name Cysyllte, one of the old townships of the parish of Llangollen. The anglicised spelling Vroncysyllte was commonly used until the mid 20th century.

== History ==
Froncysyllte is situated in the farming landscape of the Vale of Llangollen, but first developed as a settlement of cottages for quarry, limekiln, brick and tile workers during the 19th century. The village was built on a high outcrop of limestone below several quarries. Though the area's traditional industries have now gone, it still has a rich industrial archaeology.

Amongst the landmarks left around Froncysyllte by industrial development is the Pontcysyllte Aqueduct, a World Heritage Site, which was built by Thomas Telford in 1795 to carry the Llangollen Canal across the River Dee.

== Choir ==
The notable Froncysyllte Male Voice Choir was formed in 1947, in connection with the inaugural Llangollen International Musical Eisteddfod, with local management and musical direction.

Young men were persuaded to join, to make up a minimum of 60 voices needed to compete in the Eisteddfod. At the 1955 Llangollen Eisteddfod, the choir hosted an Italian choir including tenor Luciano Pavarotti, who was so impressed with his group's first-prize achievement that he decided to embark on a professional career.

The Universal Music Group album Voices of the Valley was released in November 2006, reaching number 9 on the UK album chart. It became the fastest-selling classical record of all time, achieving gold status in three days and, by 2009, had sold over half a million copies.
