= Chirk Viaduct =

Railway viaduct between England and Wales

Chirk Viaduct Traphont y Waun (Welsh)
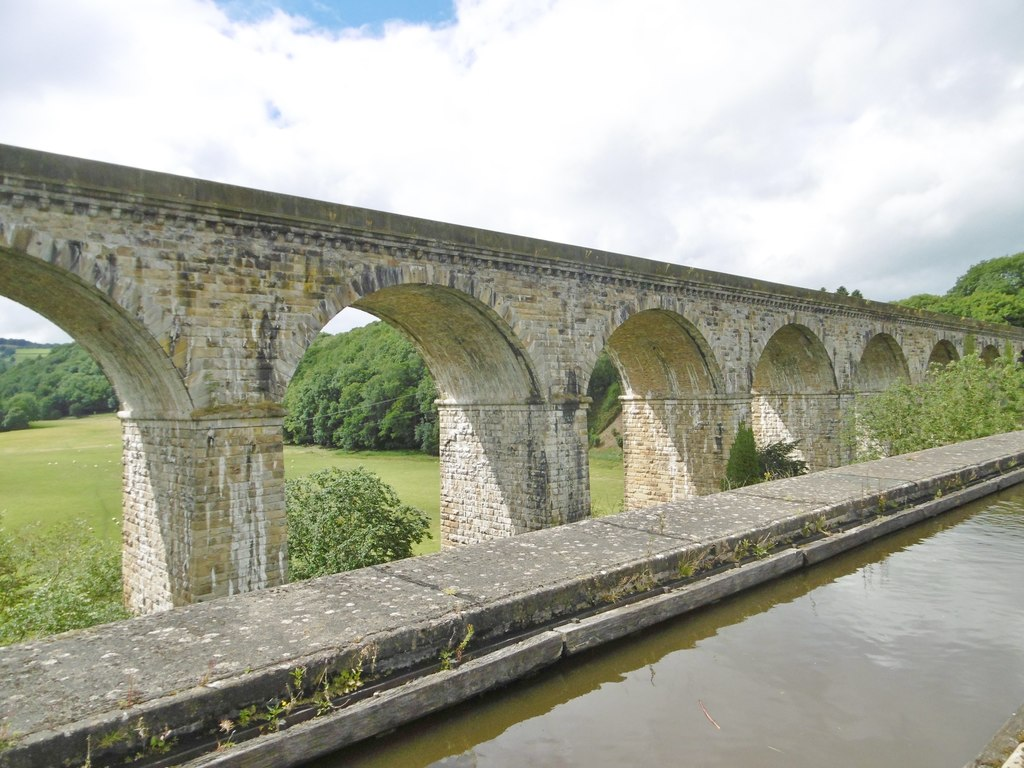
- Chirk Viaduct from Chirk Aqueduct
- Coordinates: 52.92813°N 3.06251°W
- Carries: Shrewsbury–Chester line
- Crosses: River Ceiriog
- Locale: Chirk, Wrexham, Wales and Chirk Bank, Shropshire, England

Characteristics
- Height: 30 metres (98 ft)

History
- Architect: Henry Robertson
- Built: 1848
- Rebuilt: 1858–1859 (partly)

Statistics
- Nearest city: Wrexham
- OS grid reference: SJ286372

History
- Built for: Shrewsbury and Chester Railway

Site notes
- Current use: Railway viaduct

Listed Building – Grade II*
- Official name: Railway Viaduct over River Ceiriog (Cadw) and Chirk Viaduct (Historic England)
- Designated: 29 July 1998 and 2 September 1987; Amended 29 July 1998
- Reference no.: 20210 and 1295219 (dual-listed)

Location
- Interactive map of Chirk Viaduct; Traphont y Waun (Welsh)

The Chirk Viaduct (Welsh: Traphont y Waun) is a railway viaduct with Grade II* listed status over the River Ceiriog between England and Wales. The viaduct carries the Shrewsbury–Chester line from the Welsh town of Chirk in the north to the English village of Chirk Bank in the south. To the east, the Chirk Aqueduct lies parallel to the railway viaduct.

== Description ==
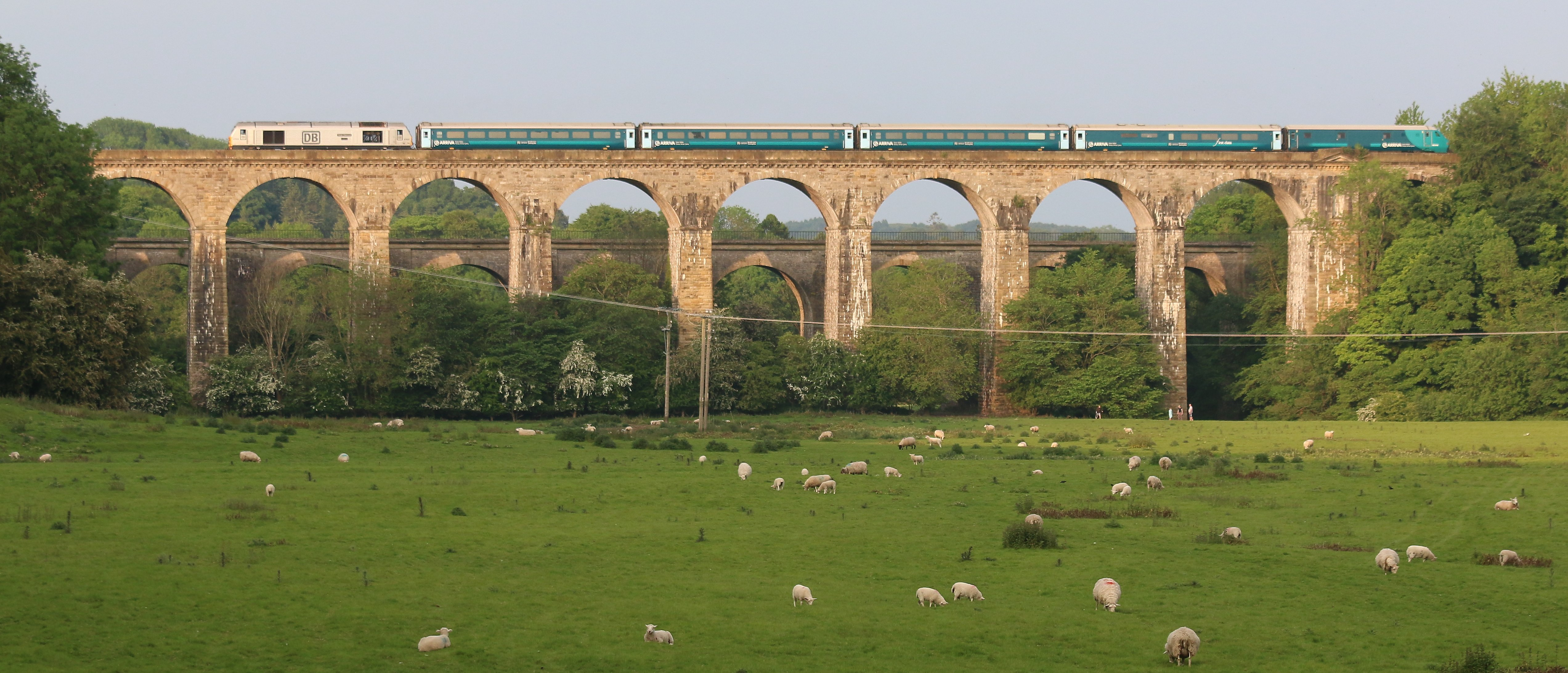
Premier Service by Arriva Trains Wales on the viaduct with the aqueduct in the background

The viaduct was designed by Henry Robertson, chief engineer of the Shrewsbury and Chester Railway, to carry the railway line across the meadows of the Vale of Ceiriog between Chirk and Chirk Bank partly in both Wales and England. The England–Wales border bisects the structure at an approximately 45° angle from south-west to north-east. It was built between 1846 and 1848, by Thomas Brassey, with it also undergoing a partial rebuilding in 1858–1859. The viaduct runs parallel to the Chirk Aqueduct, built in 1801, which lies to the viaduct's east. The viaduct was initially built with only ten arches, despite the original design to contain sixteen stone arches. Before construction, the initial sixteen-arch structure was reduced to ten over engineering issues concerning the river piers. In Robertson's original design it would have required two piers being constructed into the slopes of the valleys either side. Due to the slope's proximity to neighbouring Chirk Aqueduct and the shaky state of its abutments, it was deemed during the initial construction that constructing two piers would have been dangerous work and expensive. As a result, the design was modified with the viaduct's end piers at the foot of the valley's bank, converted into an abutment, and a long 36.5-metre (120 ft) laminated timber arch built to connect to the stone viaduct. The timber arches were later replaced ten years later, with three stone arches at either end added, bringing the total number of arches to sixteen as first designed.

The viaduct, along with the Cefn Viaduct to the north, were built for the Shrewsbury and Chester Railway to address the demand for increasing rail freight transport demand between Wrexham, Chester and Shrewsbury which were not being met by the existing canal system. The railway line became part of the Great Western Railway (GWR) in 1854, and was not converted to GWR's Broad gauge. As of 2024, the railway is owned by Network Rail and operated by Transport for Wales Rail.

=== Design ===
The viaduct contains rock-faced ashlar stone with yellow engineering brick to soffits of its central section. It stands at 30 metres (98 ft) high above the river, with its central section consisting of ten 13.7-metre (45 ft) elliptical semicircular arches between pedimented abutments, and built in 1848. The central arches contain rock-faced pointed voussoirs, projecting keystones and moulded imposts struck through to soffit; modillioned cornice and plain parapet. The abutments have shallow pediments supported on corbelled cornices and round-headed niches with mounded impost bands and projecting moulded keystones. There are three further stone arches at each end, which were added in 1858–1859 replacing the pre-existing 36.5-metre (120 ft) timber arches. The viaduct is 260 metres (850 ft) long.
