= Listed buildings in Whixall =

Whixall is a civil parish in Shropshire, England. It contains 16 listed buildings that are recorded in the National Heritage List for England. Of these, two are listed at Grade II*, the middle of the three grades, and the others are at Grade II, the lowest grade. The parish contains small settlements including Whixall and Abbey Green and is otherwise rural. The Llangollen Canal passes through the parish, and the junction with its Prees Branch is in the parish. The listed buildings associated with the canal are bridges, including three bascule bridges and a roving bridge, and a former toll house. The other listed buildings are farmhouses, cottages, a former smithy, and a church.

== Key ==
Grade	Criteria
II*	Particularly important buildings of more than special interest
II	Buildings of national importance and special interest

== Buildings ==
Name and location	Photograph	Date	Notes	Grade
Higher House; 52.91654°N 2.71315°W	—	Early 17th century	A farmhouse, later extended and divided, the earlier part is timber framed with painted brick infill, the cladding and extensions are in red brick, and the roof is tiled. There are two storeys and an attic, and an L-shaped plan, consisting of a hall range with two wide bays, a two-bay cross-wing projecting on the right, and a single-storey extension to the left. The windows are casements with segmental heads, and there is a gabled half-dormer.	II
Yew Tree Cottage; 52.89376°N 2.73480°W	—	Early 17th century	A farmhouse, later a private house, it was extended in the 20th century. The house is timber framed with rendered infill and a tile roof. There is one storey and an attic, three bays, and a one-bay 20th-century extension. On the front is a gabled porch, the windows are casements with lattice glazing, and there are three gabled eaves dormers.	II
Hornspike Road Farmhouse; 52.90223°N 2.77207°W	—	17th century	The farmhouse was remodelled and extended in the 18th century. The earlier part is in roughcast timber framing on a high red brick plinth, the extensions are in red brick with a dentilled eaves cornice, and the roof is tiled. There are two storeys, four bays, and a two-storey rear outshut. The doorway has a gabled hood, most of the windows are casements, and there is one cast iron fixed window.	II
Cottage at N.G.R.SJ 4964 3505; 52.91051°N 2.75032°W	—	Late 17th century	The cottage. later used for other purposes, is timber framed with red brick infill, the gables are in red brick, partly rendered, and the roof is in corrugated iron. There is one storey, two bays, and a single-bay extension to the right. It contains a doorway and two windows.	II
15 Waterloo; 52.89029°N 2.74260°W	—	Late 18th century	A squatter's cottage, it is in red brick with a dentilled eaves cornice and a tile roof with coped verges on carved stone kneelers. There is one storey and an attic, and two bays. It has a doorway and two fixed windows, all with segmental heads.	II
Morris' Bridge; 52.91356°N 2.75456°W		c. 1800	The bridge carries a track over the Llangollen Canal. It is a wooden bascule bridge operated by a counterweight and chain system.	II
Platt Lane Bridge; 52.92339°N 2.72890°W		c. 1800	Bridge No. 43, it carries Platt Lane over the Llangollen Canal. It is in red brick with some repairs in engineering brick, and consists of a single elliptical arch. The bridge has a stone coped parapet, keystones, a string course, and corner piers.	II
Roundthorn Bridge; 52.91643°N 2.74400°W		c. 1800	A roving bridge crossing the Llangollen Canal, it is in red brick with some repairs in engineering brick, and the ramped approaches are in stone. The bridge consists of a single elliptical arch, and it has a stone coped parapet, keystones, and a string course.	II
Roving Bridge House; 52.91175°N 2.76107°W		c. 1800	Originally a toll keeper's cottage, it is in red brick with a pyramidal slate roof. There is a square plan with two storeys facing the canal, and a semi-basement at the rear. On the front is a gabled porch with a semicircular fanlight, a casement window to the right, and a segmental-headed horizontally-sliding sash window to the left. The upper floor contains a casement window flanked by blind roundels.	II
Allman's Bridge; 52.90911°N 2.75806°W		c. 1800–06	This is Bridge No. 1 on the Prees Branch of the Llangollen Canal. It is a wooden bascule bridge operated by a counterweight and chain system.	II*
Boodles Bridge; 52.89861°N 2.74835°W		c. 1800–06	An accommodation bridge over the Prees Branch of the Llangollen Canal. It is in red brick with some repairs in engineering brick, and consists of a single elliptical arch. The bridge has a stone coped parapet, keystones, a string course, and corner piers.	II
Dobson's Bridge; 52.90332°N 2.75626°W		c. 1800–06	The bridge carries a road over the Prees Branch of the Llangollen Canal. It is in red brick with some repairs in engineering brick, and consists of a single elliptical arch. The bridge has a stone coped parapet, keystones, a string course, and corner piers.	II
Squinch bridge 52.90925°N 2.75796°W	—	c. 1800–06	The bridge carries a road over a drainage ditch. It is in red brick with a coped parapet, and consists of a single segmental arch.	II
Starks Bridge; 52.90641°N 2.75709°W		c. 1800–06	The bridge carries Malt Kiln Lane over the Llangollen Canal. It is a wooden bascule bridge operated by a counterweight and chain system. The bridge is also a scheduled monument.	II*
The Smithy; 52.91355°N 2.71332°W	—	Mid to late 19th century	The former smithy is in red brick with a dentilled eaves cornice and a slate roof. There is one storey, and it contains fixed-light windows and doorways.	II
St Mary's Church; 52.90901°N 2.71820°W		1867	The church, designed by G. E. Street, is in red brick with sandstone dressings and a slate roof with ornamental ridges. It consists of a nave, a north aisle, a chancel, and a north vestry. At the east end of the nave is a belfry with a lead roof.	II
