= Wem Rural =

Civil parish in Shropshire, England

Coordinates: 52.876°N 2.693°W

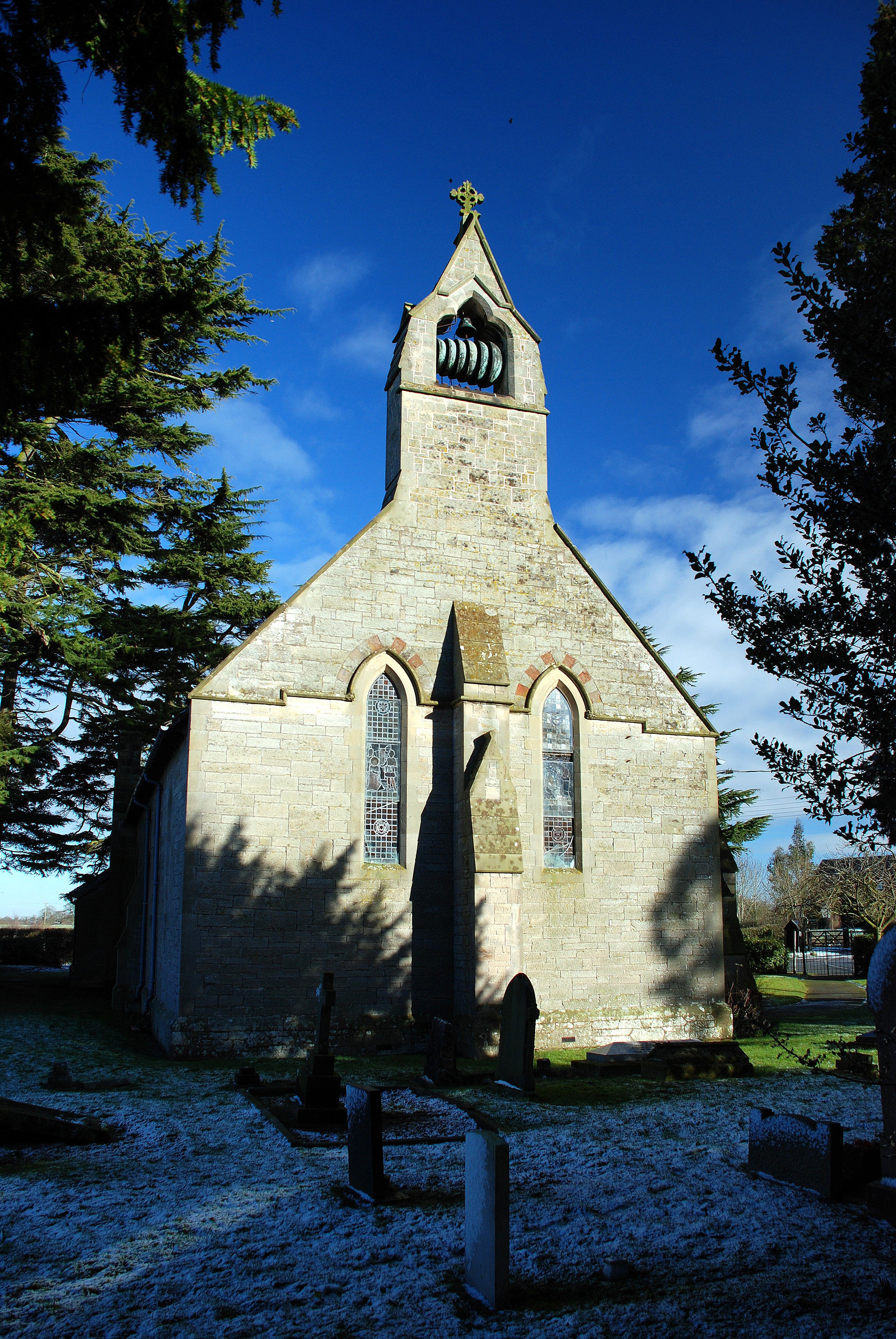
- The church in Newtown

- Location within Shropshire
- Population: 1,747 (2021 census)
- OS grid reference: SJ535312
- Unitary authority: Shropshire
- Ceremonial county: Shropshire
- Region: West Midlands
- Country: England
- Sovereign state: United Kingdom
- Police: West Mercia
- Fire: Shropshire
- Ambulance: West Midlands
- Website: Parish Council

Wem Rural is a large civil parish in Shropshire, England that encircles, but does not include, the market town of Wem. Its settlements include the villages of Aston and Barkers Green (east of Wem), Coton, Edstaston, Quina Brook and Pepperstreet (north of Wem), Horton, Newtown, Wolverley and Northwood (northwest of Wem) and Tilley (south of Wem). Prees railway station is also in the parish. The population of the parish at the 2021 census was 1,747.

The parish is part of Wem electoral division, which also includes the town and the parish of Whixall. The division elects two members of Shropshire Council.

The parish was formed in 1900 from the outer part of the parish of Wem, the inner part of which became the parish of Wem Urban in the Wem urban district. Wem Rural was part of Wem Rural District until 1967, when the rural district was abolished and became part of North Shropshire Rural District. From 1974 to 2009 it was part of North Shropshire district.

== See also ==
- Listed buildings in Wem Rural
