= Welsh End =

Coordinates: 52.918°N 2.727°W

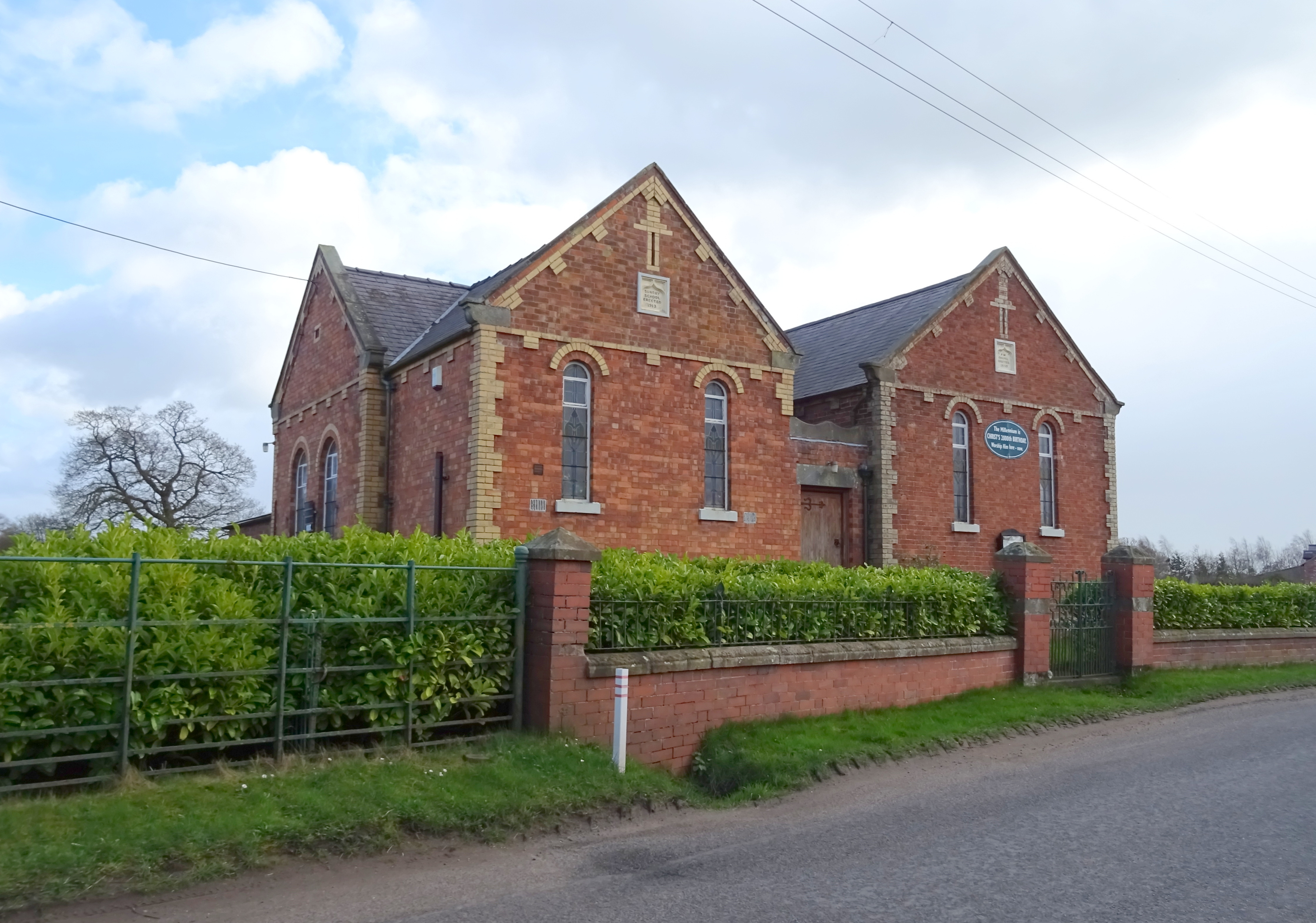
- Welsh End Methodist Chapel

- Location within Shropshire
- OS grid reference: SJ511357
- Civil parish: Whixall
- Unitary authority: Shropshire
- Ceremonial county: Shropshire
- Region: West Midlands
- Country: England
- Sovereign state: United Kingdom
- Post town: WHITCHURCH
- Postcode district: SY13
- Dialling code: 01948
- Police: West Mercia
- Fire: Shropshire
- Ambulance: West Midlands
- UK Parliament: North Shropshire

Welsh End is a small rural hamlet in the civil parish of Whixall, Shropshire, England.

The hamlet is adjacent to the border with the Welsh county of Clwyd, and is traversed by the Llangollen canal.

The main place of worship within the hamlet is Welsh End Methodist Chapel. It contains a brass Roll of Honour plaque to congregation members who served in the Second World War.

Despite the size of the hamlet, Welsh End, once boasted two public houses, 'The Pheasant' and the 'Waggoners Inn'. 'The Pheasant' is now a private house and the 'Waggoners Inn' was severely damaged by a fire in early 2008 and did not re-open.
