= Whixall =

Village in Shropshire, England

Coordinates: 52.906°N 2.721°W

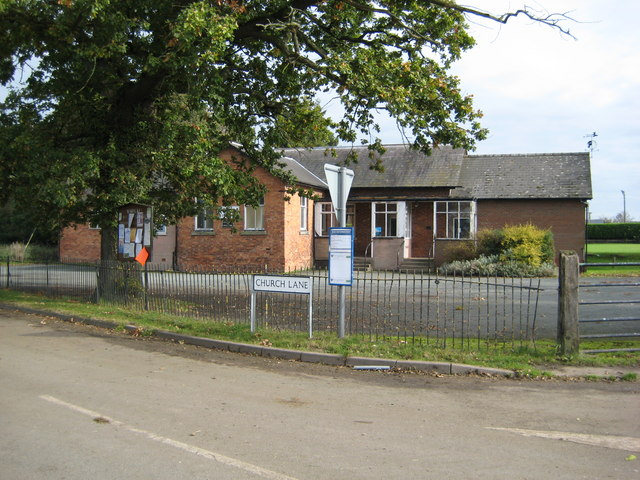
- Whixall Social Centre

- Location within Shropshire
- Population: 795 (2011)
- Demonym: Whixalite
- OS grid reference: SJ516344
- Civil parish: Whixall
- Unitary authority: Shropshire
- Ceremonial county: Shropshire
- Region: West Midlands
- Country: England
- Sovereign state: United Kingdom
- Post town: Whitchurch
- Postcode district: SY13
- Dialling code: 01948
- Police: West Mercia
- Fire: Shropshire
- Ambulance: West Midlands
- UK Parliament: North Shropshire

Whixall is, by land area, the third largest inland village in England and a civil parish in Shropshire, England. It is documented in the Domesday Book as having been in existence in 1086.

The nearest towns are Whitchurch, to the north, and Wem, to the south.

The parish lies on the border with the county borough of Wrexham, Wales. Its close proximity to Wales is shown by a hamlet called Welsh End.

Within the parish boundaries (encompassing seven square miles) are various hamlets including Abbey Green, Hollinwood, Welsh End, Stanley Green, Dobson's Bridge, Far End and Waterloo.

Whixall village contains a Church of England village church, and primary school. The village's outdoor war memorial, a square-section obelisk, stands in fenced area on the roadside by the school.

In July 2021 a Bronze Age stone artwork that became known as the "Whixall Monolith" or Whixall Stone, was discovered in the creation of a drive at a house in the village. Adorned with cup and ring carvings, the Permio-Triassic red sandstone block is apparently the first such monolith to be found in Shropshire.

The Llangollen Canal of the Shropshire Union Canal and the short Prees Branch of the Ellesmere Canal run through the parish.

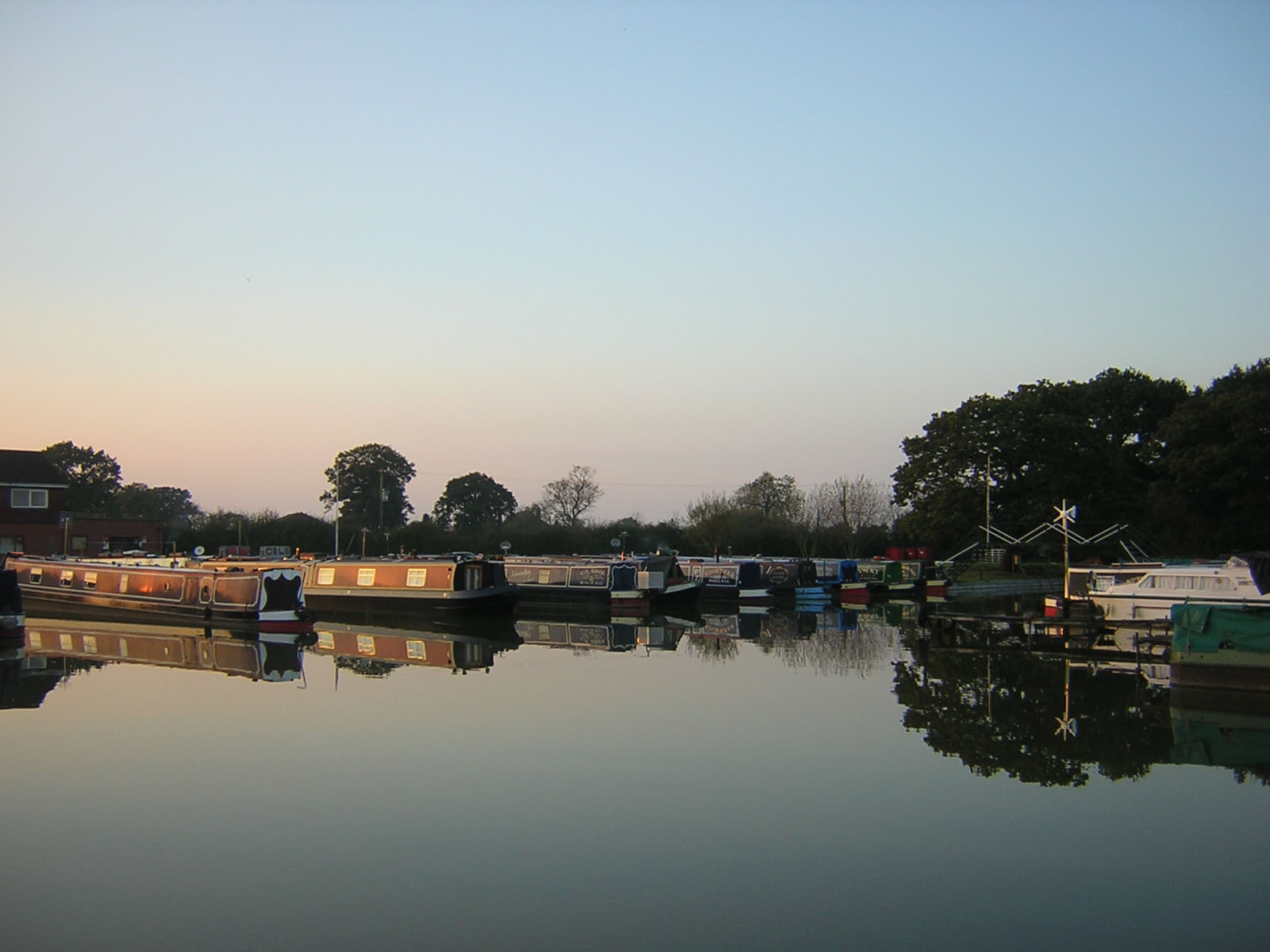
Evening over Whixall Marina

Prees was the intended destination of the Prees Branch, however the arm was only completed as far as Quina Brook. The arm is now known as the Prees Branch of the Llangollen Canal, and is navigable for about a mile to Whixall Marina. The remaining 3/4 mile is still followable on the towpath as it passes through Prees Branch Canal Nature Reserve. The canal is crossed by Dobson's Bridge, a fixed humpback bridge, which was classified in 1987 as a Grade Il listed building. It is also crossed by the listed Stark's Bridge, currently undergoing restoration.

Adjacent to Whixall is Whixall Moss, part of Fenn's, Whixall and Bettisfield Mosses National Nature Reserve, the third largest lowland raised bog in Britain, a rare habitat and the home of a number of rare species.

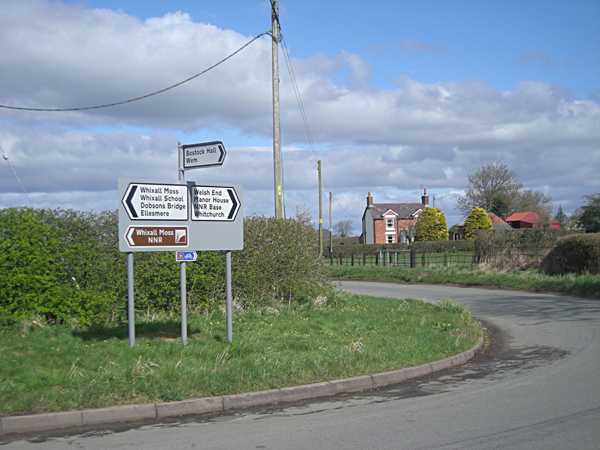
A sign on a typical rural lane shows the way to some of the Whixall points of interest.

The Shropshire Way long distance footpath runs through Whixall.

== See also ==
- Whixall Moss (large local nature reserve)
- Listed buildings in Whixall
