= Chirk Aqueduct =

Bridge on the England–Wales border

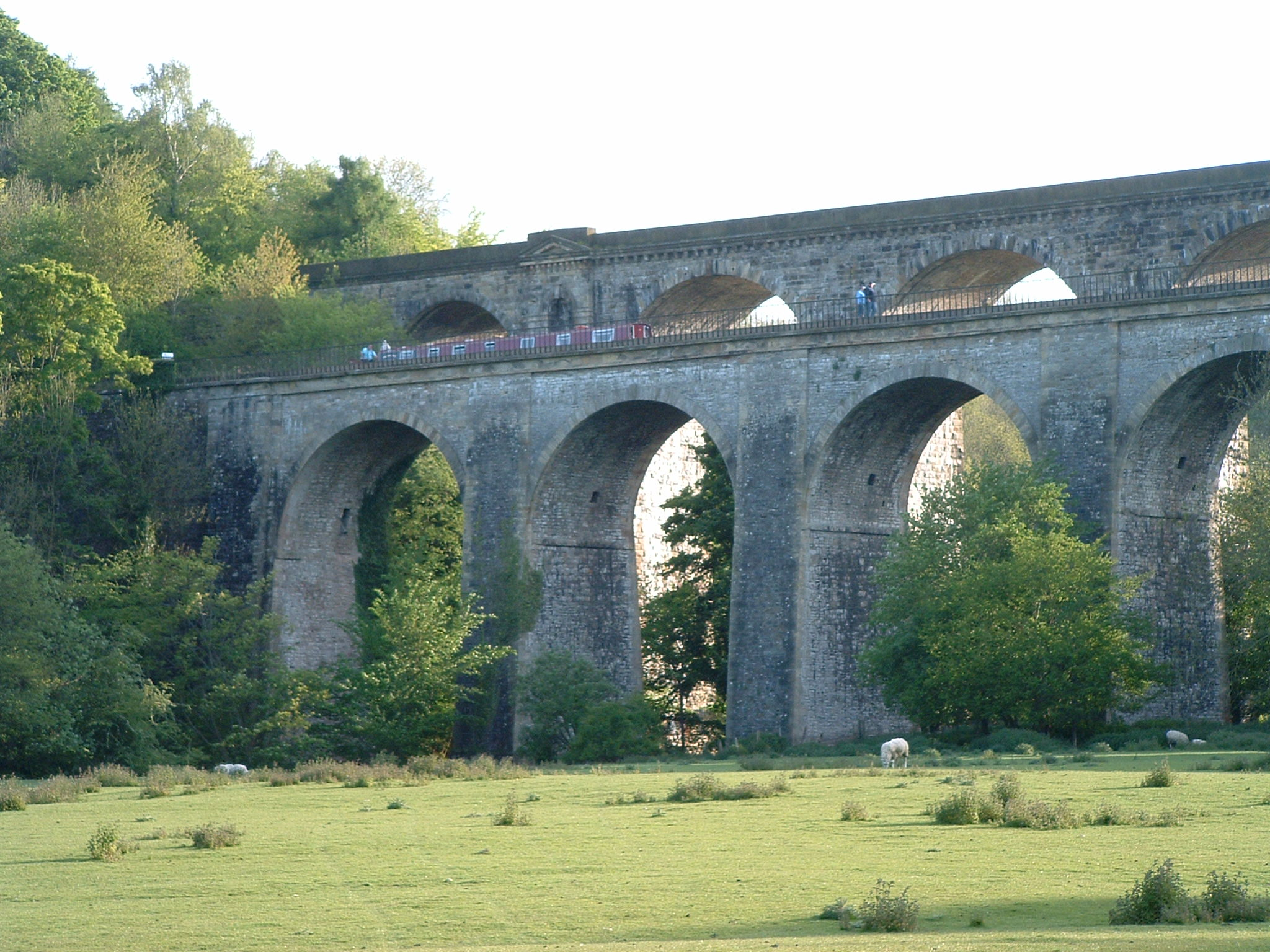
- Chirk Aqueduct and the railway viaduct behind it
- Coordinates: 52.9282°N 3.0622°W
- OS grid reference: SJ287373
- Carries: Llangollen Canal
- Crosses: Ceiriog Valley
- Locale: Chirk
- Maintained by: Canal and River Trust

Characteristics
- Trough construction: Cast iron
- Pier construction: Masonry
- Total length: 710 feet (220 m)
- Height: 70 feet (21 m)
- Traversable?: Yes
- Towpaths: East Side
- No. of spans: Ten

History
- Designer: Thomas Telford
- Construction end: 1801

Chirk Aqueduct is a 70-foot (21 m) high and 710-foot (220 m) long navigable aqueduct that carries what is now the Llangollen Canal across the Ceiriog Valley near Chirk, on the England–Wales border, spanning the two countries.

== History ==
The aqueduct was designed by civil engineer Thomas Telford for the Ellesmere Canal. The resident engineer was M. Davidson who also acted as resident engineer on a number of Telford's other works. The foundation stone was laid on 17 June 1796 and it was completed in 1801. It has a cast iron trough within which the water is contained. The masonry walls hide the cast iron interior. The aqueduct followed Telford's innovative Longdon-on-Tern Aqueduct on the Shrewsbury Canal, and was a forerunner of the Pontcysyllte Aqueduct, also on the Llangollen Canal. The aqueduct was briefly the tallest navigable one ever built, and it now is Grade II* listed in both England and Wales. It forms part of the Pontcysyllte Aqueduct World Heritage Site.

== Description ==
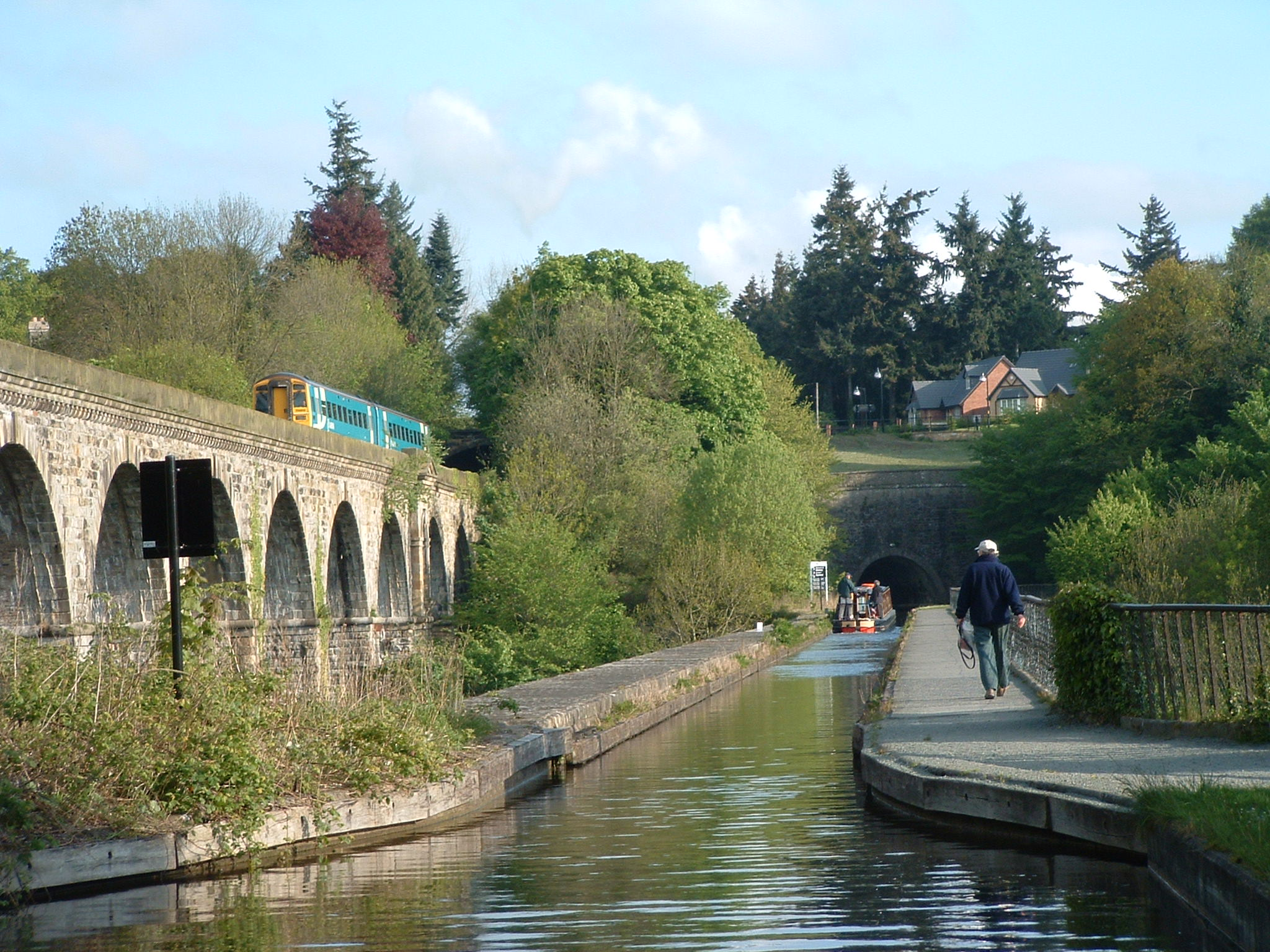
Looking towards Wales along the aqueduct. The entrance to the Chirk Tunnel is visible behind it.

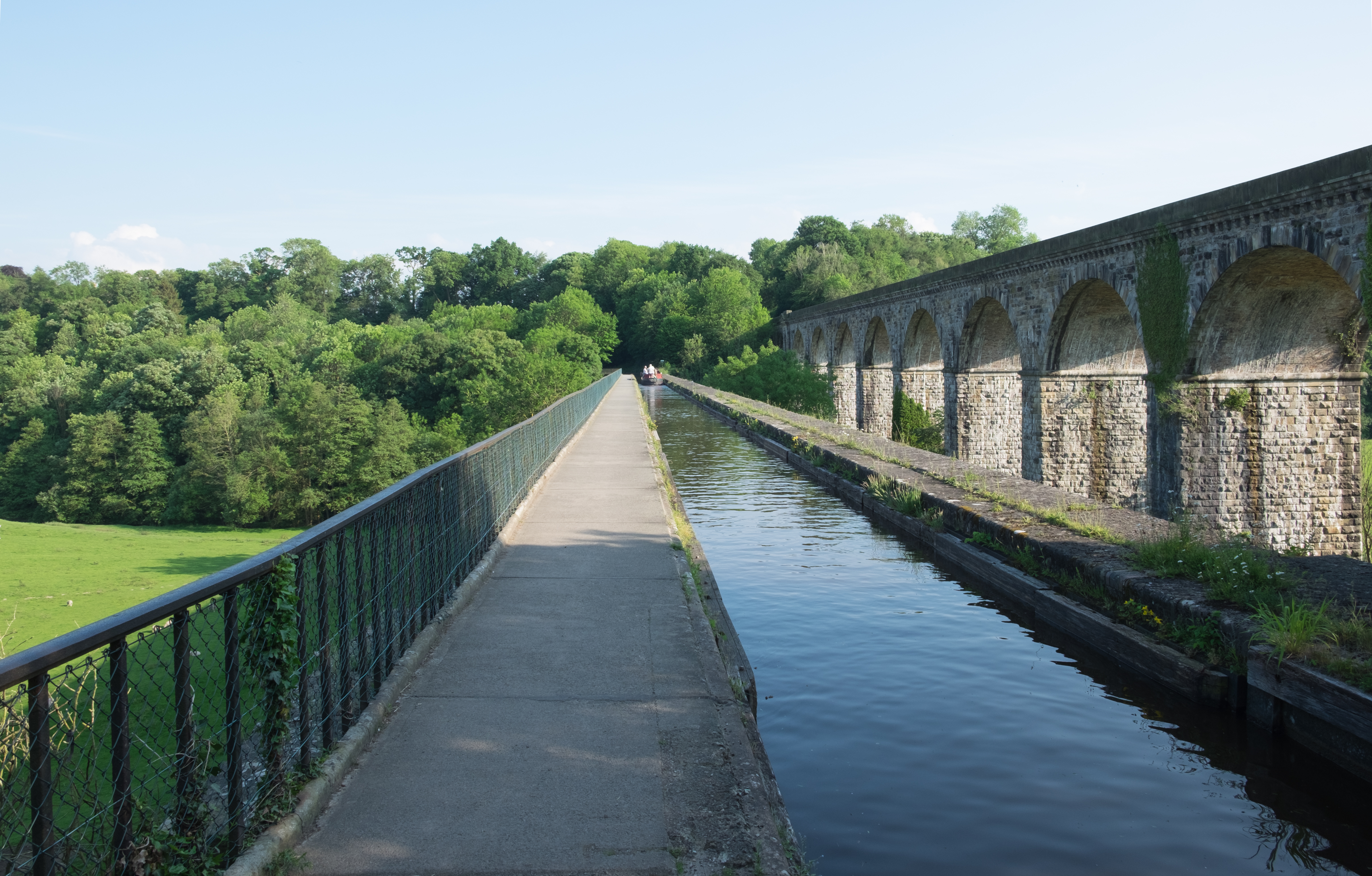
Looking towards England along the aqueduct

The aqueduct consists of ten arches, each with a span of 40 feet (12 m). The water level is 65 feet (20 m) above the ground and 70 feet (21 m) above the River Ceiriog. The stone work is yellow sandstone. William Hazledine provided the ironwork for the aqueduct. Originally built with iron plates only at the base of the trough, iron side plates were added to the aqueduct in 1870 to alleviate leakage.

The Chirk Tunnel starts at the north end of the Chirk Aqueduct, allowing the canal to continue on towards Llangollen. Chirk Railway Viaduct was built later alongside the aqueduct. It is slightly higher than the aqueduct.

As is true for the entire Llangollen Canal, a steady current flows in the aqueduct with the narrow cross-section of the aqueduct's trough amplifying this flow.

== See also ==
- List of canal aqueducts in the United Kingdom
- List of bridges in Wales
