= Tilley, Shropshire =

Village in Shropshire, England

Coordinates: 52.846°N 2.731°W

Tilley
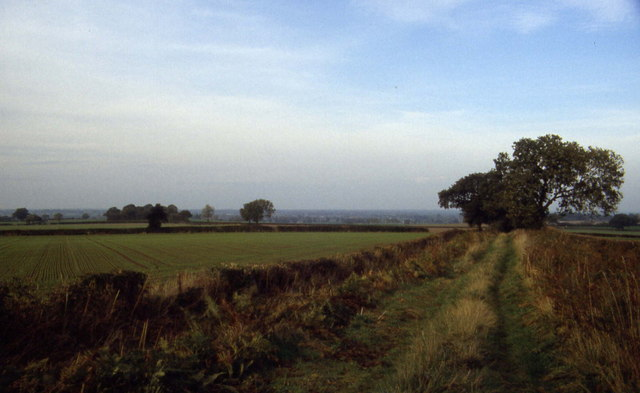
- Farmland towards Trench Hall and Tilley Green

- Location within Shropshire
- OS grid reference: SJ507278
- Civil parish: Wem Rural
- Unitary authority: Shropshire
- Ceremonial county: Shropshire
- Region: West Midlands
- Country: England
- Sovereign state: United Kingdom
- Post town: SHREWSBURY
- Postcode district: SY4
- Dialling code: 01939
- Police: West Mercia
- Fire: Shropshire
- Ambulance: West Midlands
- UK Parliament: North Shropshire

Tilley is a small village in the civil parish of Wem Rural, to the south of and almost merged with Wem in north Shropshire.

A hamlet, Tilley Green, lies to its southeast at grid reference SJ511273. The village or hamlet comprises around 20 dwellings and of these up to 10 are designated listed buildings including Tilley Manor, Tilley Farm and Brook Cottage; all three are timber-framed and have their origins in the Medieval and early Post Medieval periods; Tilley Farm and Manor are of the classic cross-wing vernacular and clearly very early in date, probably 13th/14th century.

Despite the wealth of medieval and post-medieval timber-framed buildings, Tilley does not possess a church. However, it is probable that such a building may have existed somewhere within the centre of the village, probably close to the manor house.

The hamlet appears to be divided into two clusters; the main settlement centred on the medieval buildings and to the east, a peripheral area lying close to the railway which comprise buildings that date from the 18th and 19th centuries.

Between 2014 and 2018 the people of the village obtained a substantial grant from the Heritage Lottery Fund (HLF) to undertake a dendrochronology project which investigated up to 35 historic timber-framed buildings including 11 Listed Buildings. The results of this survey were published in a book - The Tilley Timber Project (2018).

== See also ==
- Listed buildings in Wem Rural
