= Aston, Wem Rural =

Village in Shropshire, England

Coordinates: 52.853°N 2.699°W

Aston
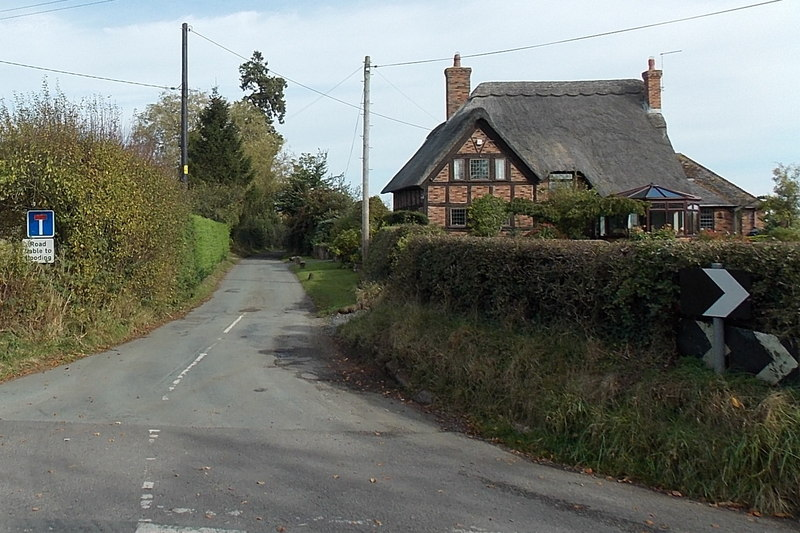
- Alderley Lane, Aston

- Location within Shropshire
- OS grid reference: SJ529286
- Civil parish: Wem Rural
- Unitary authority: Shropshire
- Ceremonial county: Shropshire
- Region: West Midlands
- Country: England
- Sovereign state: United Kingdom
- Post town: SHREWSBURY
- Postcode district: SY4
- Dialling code: 01939
- Police: West Mercia
- Fire: Shropshire
- Ambulance: West Midlands
- UK Parliament: North Shropshire

Aston is a small village in Wem Rural civil parish, Shropshire, England, near the River Roden. Aston contains a Grade II listed cottage.

== See also ==
- Listed buildings in Wem Rural
