= Abbey Green, Shropshire =

Village in Shropshire, England

Coordinates: 52.894°N 2.734°W

Abbey Green
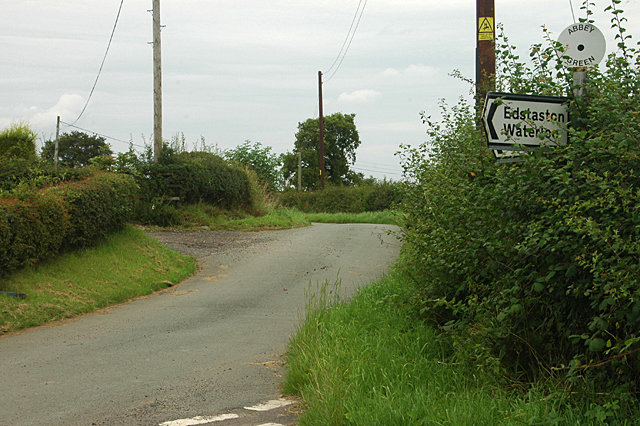
- Abbey Green junction

- Location within Shropshire
- OS grid reference: SJ506332
- Civil parish: Whixall
- Unitary authority: Shropshire
- Ceremonial county: Shropshire
- Region: West Midlands
- Country: England
- Sovereign state: United Kingdom
- Post town: WHITCHURCH
- Postcode district: SY13
- Dialling code: 01948
- Police: West Mercia
- Fire: Shropshire
- Ambulance: West Midlands
- UK Parliament: North Shropshire

Abbey Green is a village in Shropshire, England at grid reference SJ5033.

Abbey Green forms part of the civil parish of Whixall.

== See also ==
- Listed buildings in Whixall
