= Prees Branch Canal Nature Reserve =

Canal and nature reserve in Shropshire, England

Coordinates: 52.89692°N 2.74882°W

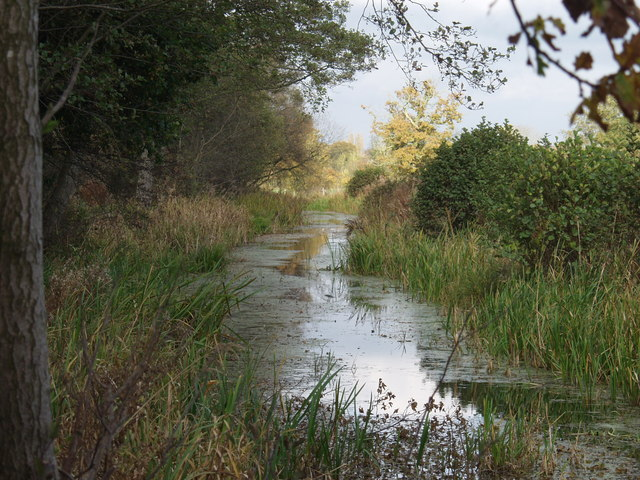
The canal at the reserve is no longer navigable.

Prees Branch Canal Nature Reserve is a Shropshire Wildlife Trust nature reserve in the civil parish of Whixall, Shropshire, England. It is a Site of Special Scientific Interest due to the presence of rare pondweeds (Potamogeton), and also is the home of watervoles. Dragonflies and other invertebrates occur in the water, on the banks and in the air above. The reserve contains a number of uncommon plants and is visited by birds such as the kingfisher and waterfowl. Otters sometimes occur.

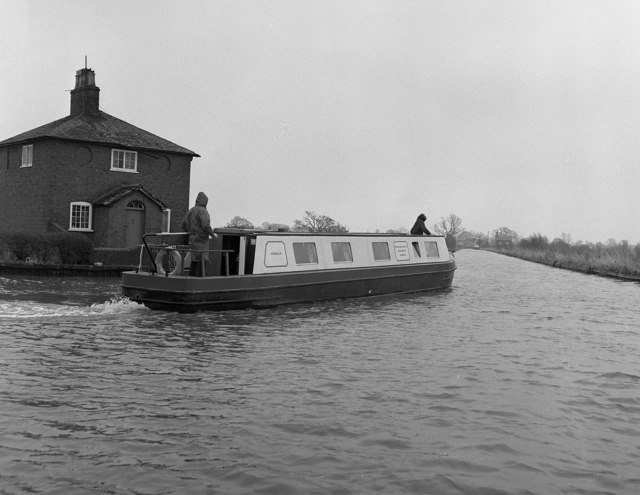
A narrowboat enters the Prees Branch from the Llangollen Canal.

The Prees Branch canal was originally meant to be an extension of the Ellesmere Canal (now the Llangollen Canal) to Prees, but was only constructed as far as Quina Brook. It is only navigable as far as a marina, beyond which the reserve is effectively a long pond and its banks.
