= Barkers Green =

Coordinates: 52.846°N 2.704°W

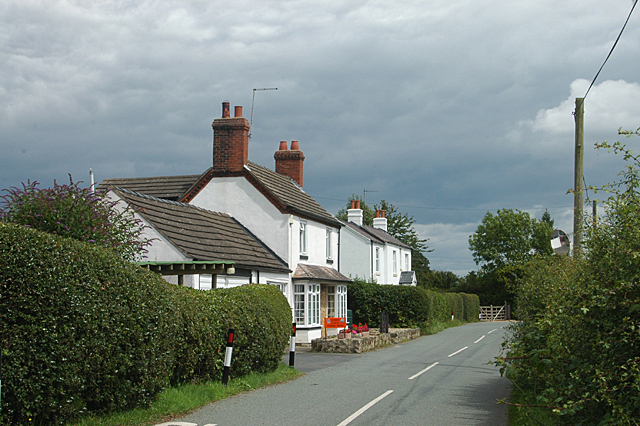
- Cattery and cottage, Barkers Green

- Location within Shropshire
- OS grid reference: SJ525278
- Civil parish: Wem Rural
- Unitary authority: Shropshire
- Ceremonial county: Shropshire
- Region: West Midlands
- Country: England
- Sovereign state: United Kingdom
- Post town: SHREWSBURY
- Postcode district: SY4
- Dialling code: 01939
- Police: West Mercia
- Fire: Shropshire
- Ambulance: West Midlands
- UK Parliament: North Shropshire

Barkers Green is a hamlet near Wem in Shropshire, England.
