= Chirk Tunnel =

Canal tunnel in Wales

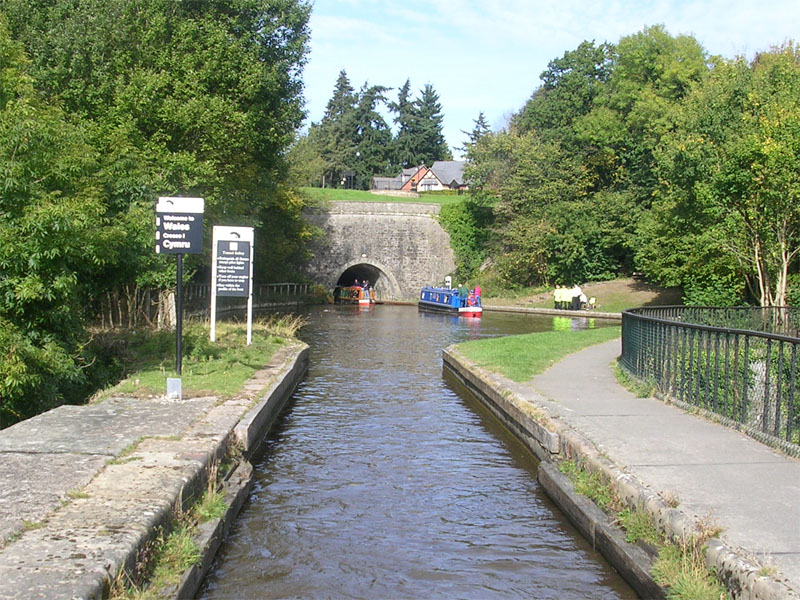
- Chirk tunnel viewed from Chirk aqueduct.
- Interactive map of Chirk Tunnel

Overview
- Coordinates: 52°55′53.13″N 3°3′53.9″W
- OS grid reference: SJ284376
- Status: Open
- Waterway: Llangollen Canal
- Start: 52°55′46.93″N 3°3′46.73″W
- End: 52°55′57.5″N 3°4′0.33″W

Operation
- Constructed: 1794–1802
- Owner: Canal & River Trust

Technical
- Design engineer: William Jessop; Thomas Telford
- Length: 421 m (1,381 ft)
- Towpath: Yes
- Boat-passable: No

Chirk Tunnel is a canal tunnel near Chirk, Wales. It lies on the Llangollen Canal, immediately northwards of the Chirk Aqueduct. It is 421 metres (460 yd) long and has a complete towpath inside.

The tunnel is designed for a single standard narrowboat, so passing is not possible. The tunnel is straight enough to be able to see if a boat is already inside the tunnel, and boats are required to show a light. Northbound boats must maintain power and momentum in order to push through, due to the shallow, narrow nature of the canal in the tunnel (such that water has little space to pass around the displacement of the boat), and the relatively fast 2 miles per hour (3.2 km/h) southbound current of the canal. The tunnel, the tunnel portals and the canal basin are collectively a Grade II* listed structure.

== History ==
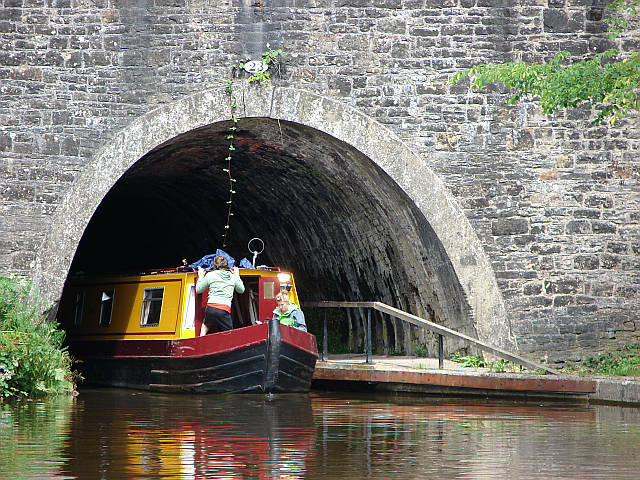
Southern portal of the tunnel

In 1791, the embryonic Ellesmere Canal was planning a network of canals to link the Chester Canal to Shrewsbury, with branches to Ruabon and Llangollen, Bersham, Llanymynech and possibly to Whitchurch and Wem. The promoters asked William Jessop to assess their plans, and he produced plans for a rather different route, running from the Chester Canal basin through Wrexham, Bersham, Ruabon, Pontcysyllte, Chirk, Frankton and Weston to reach Shrewsbury. The route would have involved three tunnels, one of 4,607 yards (4,213 m) at Ruabon, one of 476 yards (435 m) at Weston, and a tunnel under the Froncysyllte limeworks at Chirk, which would have been 1,236 yards (1,130 m) long.

Rival parties supporting the different routes joined forces in February 1793, and the canal was authorised by the Ellesmere and Chester Canal Act 1793 (33 Geo. 3. c. 91) on 30 April of that year. A whole series of alterations and deviations had been rushed through in the intervening months, and the canal at Chirk now crossed the River Ceiriog at a different location, resulting in a shorter tunnel. The contract for the adjacent aqueduct was let in January 1796, and its construction was completed in 1801. The 8 miles (13 km) of canal eastwards to Frankton was opened immediately, because of the valuable trade in limestone from the Fron Quarries. The section through the tunnel, which also passed through Whitehurst Tunnel to reach Pontcysyllte was opened in June 1802.

== Walking through the tunnel ==
The tunnel is claimed to be the first in Britain to have a towpath running through it (along with its shorter neighbour, Whitehurst Tunnel). However, Berwick Tunnel on the Shrewsbury Canal was open by 1797 and included a towpath throughout its 970-yard (890 m) length. As the tunnel at Chirk is completely unlit, a torch/flashlight is necessary for anyone walking through the tunnel, as it is pitch black in the centre. A wooden handrail along the entire length prevents walkers from falling into the canal.

== See also ==
- List of canal tunnels in the United Kingdom

== Bibliography ==
- Hadfield, Charles (1985). The Canals of the West Midlands. David and Charles. ISBN 0-7153-8644-1.
