= Quina Brook =

Hamlet in Shropshire, England

Coordinates: 52.891°N 2.709°W

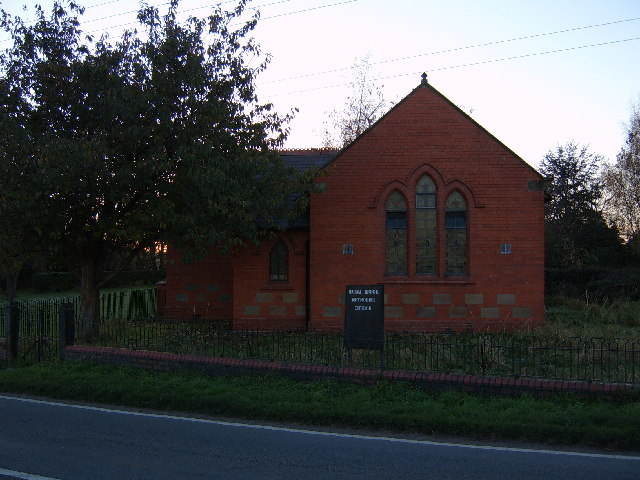
- Methodist chapel in Quina Brook

- Location within Shropshire
- OS grid reference: SJ524329
- Civil parish: Wem Rural
- Unitary authority: Shropshire
- Ceremonial county: Shropshire
- Region: West Midlands
- Country: England
- Sovereign state: United Kingdom
- Post town: SHREWSBURY
- Postcode district: SY4
- Dialling code: 01939
- Police: West Mercia
- Fire: Shropshire
- Ambulance: West Midlands
- UK Parliament: North Shropshire

Quina Brook is a hamlet in north Shropshire, near the border between England and Wales. Population details for the 2011 census are found under Wem Rural.

Quina Brook was the final destination of an arm of the Ellesmere Canal. This arm was originally going to terminate at Prees. The arm is now known as the Prees Branch of the Llangollen Canal, and is navigable for about a mile to Whixall Marina, the following 3/4 mile is still followable on the towpath as it passes through Prees Branch Canal Nature Reserve.

== See also ==
- Listed buildings in Wem Rural
