= Chirk Bank =

Village in Shropshire, England

Coordinates: 52.925°N 3.055°W

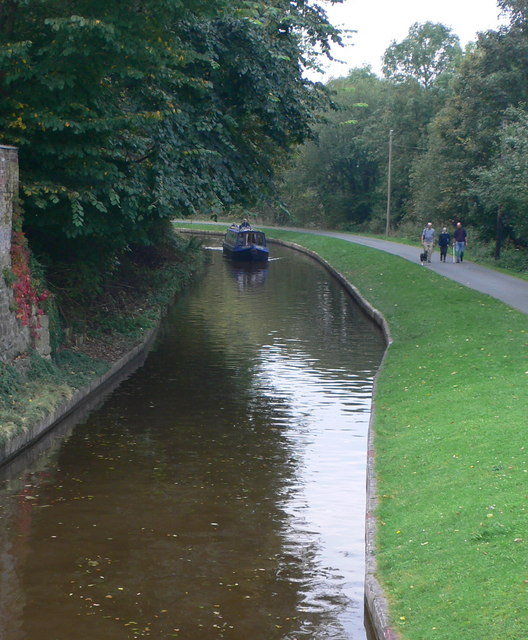
- Llangollen Canal at Chirk Bank

- Location within Shropshire
- OS grid reference: SJ290369
- Civil parish: Weston Rhyn
- Unitary authority: Shropshire
- Ceremonial county: Shropshire
- Region: West Midlands
- Country: England
- Sovereign state: United Kingdom
- Post town: WREXHAM
- Postcode district: LL14
- Dialling code: 01691
- Police: West Mercia
- Fire: Shropshire
- Ambulance: West Midlands
- UK Parliament: North Shropshire

Chirk Bank is a small village in Shropshire, England.

The industrial town of Chirk is to the north, over the border in Wales, with the B5070 road connecting the two settlements via a bridge (Chirk Bridge) over the River Ceiriog. The larger village of Weston Rhyn is to the south-west and Chirk Bank is part of its civil parish. The hamlet of Gledrid (Welsh: Y Galedryd) is just outside Chirk Bank, near to the A5 road and on the border (the B5070) with the parish of St Martin's.

Many of the houses on Chirk Bank date back to the seventeenth century and houses along Oaklands Road have a particularly rich history, one of which was the home to the famous Chrispin Whispers.

The Llangollen Canal passes by the village. There are three public houses in the vicinity: The Bridge, the Lord Moreton, and the Poachers Pocket.
