= Llangollen Canal =

Canal in Wales and Shropshire, England

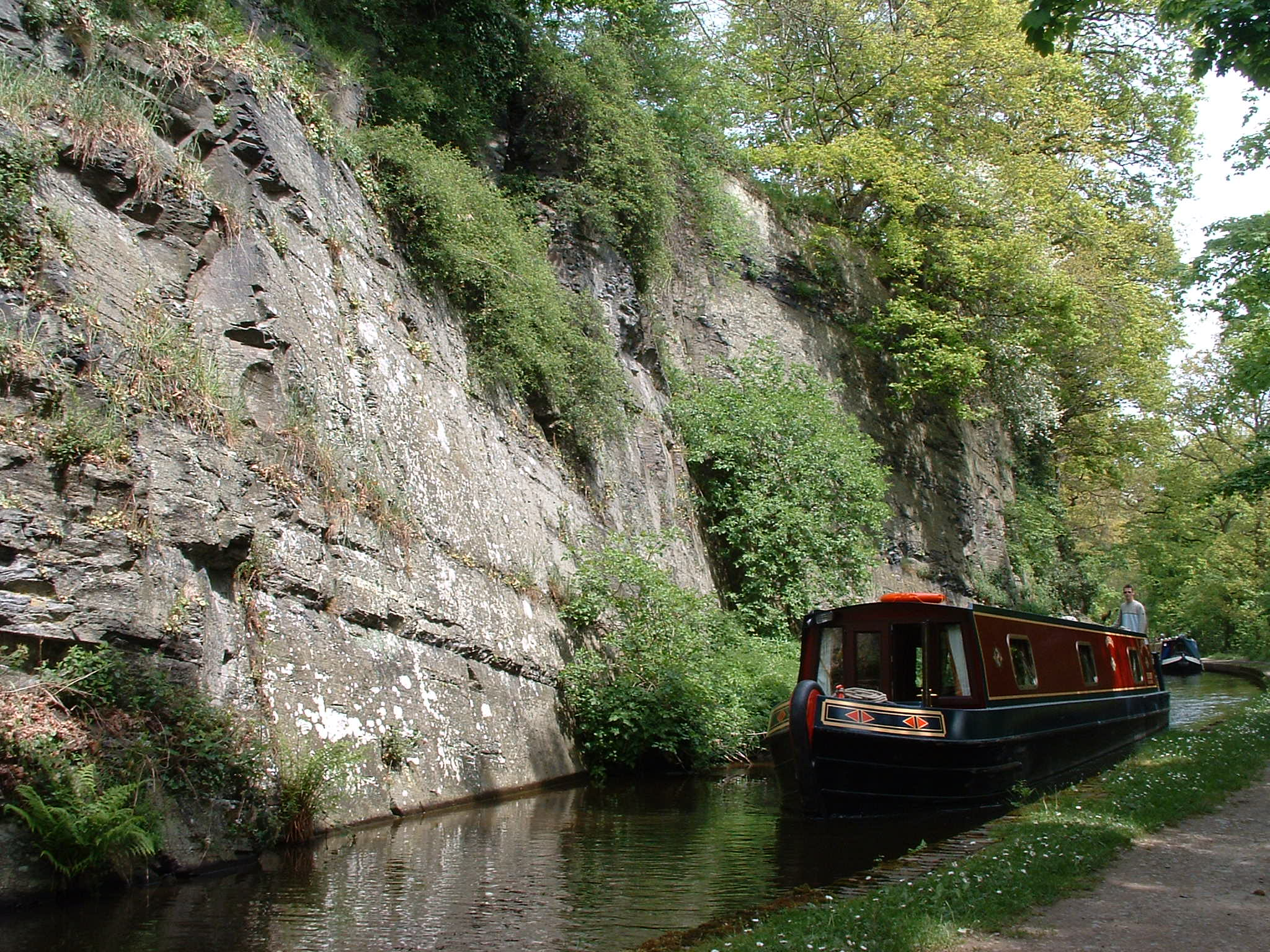
- Llangollen canal: The final narrows before Llangollen
- Interactive map of Llangollen Canal

Specifications
- Length: 46 miles (74 km)
- Maximum boat length: 70 ft 0 in (21.34 m)
- Maximum boat beam: 6 ft 10 in (2.08 m) (Fenders must be raised in locks – warning shown at Hurleston)
- Locks: 21
- Maximum height above sea level: 230 ft (70 m)
- Status: Open
- Navigation authority: Canal & River Trust

Geography
- Start point: Hurleston Junction (Junction with Shropshire Union Canal)
- End point: Llangollen (Unnavigable canal continues to Horseshoe Falls)
- Branch(es): Montgomery Canal, Prees Branch, Ellesmere Arm, Whitchurch Arm, Trevor Basin

The Llangollen Canal (Welsh: Camlas Llangollen) is a navigable canal crossing the border between England and Wales. The waterway links Llangollen in Denbighshire, north Wales, with Hurleston in south Cheshire, via the town of Ellesmere, Shropshire. The name, which was coined in the 1980s, is a modern designation for parts of the historic Ellesmere Canal and the Llangollen navigable feeder, both of which became part of the Shropshire Union Canals in 1846.

The Ellesmere Canal was proposed by industrialists at Ruabon and Brymbo, and two disconnected sections were built. The northern section ran from Ellesmere Port on the River Mersey to Chester, where it joined the Chester Canal, and opened in 1795. Work on the southern section began at Frankton, with a line southwards to Llanymynech, and subsequently, a second section was built westwards towards Trevor. This involved crossing the Afon Ceiriog and the River Dee, which was achieved by building two vast aqueducts, using iron troughs to contain the water. The Ceiriog was crossed at Chirk, and Chirk Aqueduct opened in 1801, to exploit local supplies of iron and coal. The canal then passed through Chirk Tunnel, and reached the southern end of Pontcysyllte Aqueduct in 1802, which was not completed until 1805. To join the two halves up, a heavily engineered route from Trevor Basin via Ruabon and Brymbo to the River Dee at Chester was planned, but very little of it was built. Instead, the present route from Frankton to Hurleston Junction on the Chester Canal was constructed, and opened in 1805. As the route never reached the water reservoir at Moss Valley, Wrexham (built in 1786), a navigable feeder was built to Llantisilio where the Horseshoe Falls weir was constructed on the River Dee to supply the canal.

As part of the Shropshire Union system, the canal from Hurleston to Llangollen thrived until the end of the First World War, after which it saw very little traffic. Navigation was formally abandoned under the terms of the London Midland and Scottish Railway (Canals) Act 1944 (8 & 9 Geo. 6. c. ii), obtained by the owners, the London Midland and Scottish Railway, but the channel was retained as it still supplied water to the main line of the Shropshire Union, and subsequently to the Mid and South-East Cheshire Water Board. This arrangement was due to end in 1954, but as there was no alternative supply of water, the powers were extended. Early pioneering cruises of the waterway were made by Tom Rolt in 1947 and 1949, and despite it being officially closed, a number of boats started to use it. There was a growing campaign to reopen it, but it was still designated as one of the 'waterways having insufficient commercial prospects to justify their retention for navigation' under government papers published in 1955 and 1958. It was not until the passing of the Transport Act 1968 that the route was finally designated as a cruiseway, and its future was secured. As leisure use of the canals grew, the route was rebranded as "The Llangollen Canal" in the 1980s, and it has become one of the most popular routes for holidaymakers. Its importance in the history of the British canal system was recognised in 2009, when the 11-mile (18 km) stretch from Gledrid Bridge near Rhoswiel to Horseshoe Falls including Pontcysyllte and Chirk aqueducts was declared a World Heritage Site by UNESCO.

== History ==
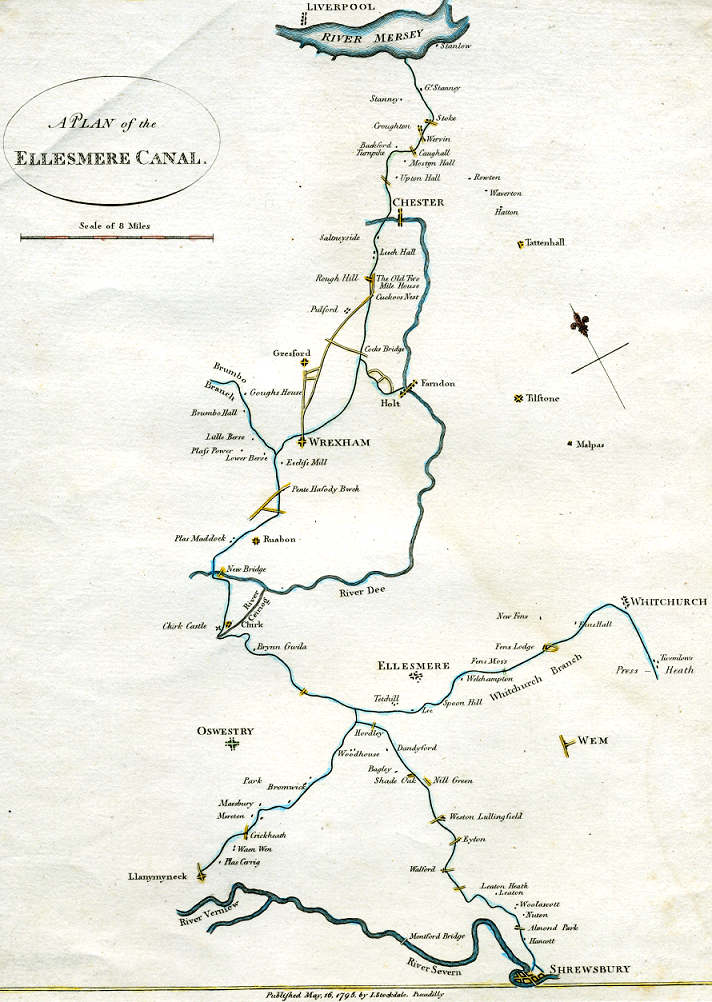
Map showing the planned route for the Ellesmere Canal between Chester and Shrewsbury. The feeder to Llangollen was never envisaged in the original proposal.

A grand plan for the Ellesmere Canal was first proposed in 1791 by a small group of industrialists who owned coal mines, iron mines and other works near Ruabon. They wanted to link their area to the River Mersey in the north and the River Severn to the south. The northward section would link up with the Chester Canal and hence the River Dee before continuing to the Mersey at Netherpool (now Ellesmere Port). The southerly section of the waterway would pass through Overton before heading towards Shrewsbury. There would be branches to Bersham and Brymbo, where there were ironworks, to Llanymynech, where limestone was being quarried, and it would run past Whitchurch to Prees. A rival group proposed a branch from the Chester Canal to reach Ruabon, via Whitchurch, with additional lines to Llanymynech and Shrewsbury. There was support for the plans of the first group, and work began, but twelve years later, the plans of the second group had largely been implemented.

John Duncombe, an engineer who was one of the original promoters, and Joseph Turner estimated that the main line to Netherpool and to Shrewsbury would cost £67,456, while the whole scheme, including the branches, would cost £171,098. The promoters then decided they needed an engineer with a track record to advise them, and engaged the services of William Jessop, to be assisted by Duncombe and William Turner. Jessop proposed a somewhat different route south of Chester. It was the time of Canal Mania, and when subscriptions were opened, 1,234 subscribers offered a total of £967,700, of which £245,500 was actually accepted. In February 1793, the two groups decided to work together, and a host of deviations and alterations were made to the plans, for which an act of Parliament, the Ellesmere and Chester Canal Act 1793 (33 Geo. 3. c. 91) was obtained on 30 April 1793. A capital of £400,000 was authorised, with powers to raise an additional £100,000 if required, and Jessop was appointed as engineer, to be assisted by Duncombe, Thomas Denson and William Turner. On 30 October, Thomas Telford was also engaged.

Work began on the route southwards from Netherpool in November 1793, and packet boats started to run along it from 1 July 1795, although it was not quite finished. Three locks to connect it to the Mersey were completed in early 1796, and coal was first carried to Chester in February. The connection to the Chester Canal took a little longer, and was completed in January 1797. The company were keen to develop the trade in limestone from Llanymynech, and cutting of the canal southwards from Frankton began in early 1794. At the time, plans for the Montgomeryshire Canal were before Parliament, which would continue southwards from Carreghofa, just beyond Llanymynech. With four locks at Frankton, and another three at Aston, the line to Carreghofa was opened in autumn 1796, and a good trade in limestone northwards, and goods southwards to the Montgomeryshire Canal, developed.

Progress north-westwards from Frankton towards Trevor was hampered by the need to cross two rivers, the Afon Ceiriog at Chirk and the Dee at Pontcysyllte. Both would require tall aqueducts, but to save construction costs at Pontcysylle, plans were drawn up for three locks at each end, to reduce the height of the main arches by 50 feet (15 m). However, on 14 July 1795 Jessop proposed that the aqueduct should be built 125 feet (38 m) above the Dee, and that the costs should be saved by using an iron trough. He also proposed a similar trough at Chirk, instead of an embankment at Pont-faen, writing that "instead of an obstruction it would be a romantic feature in the view", and this was a major factor in persuading the landowner to allow it to be built at Chirk, rather than at Pont-faen. The foundation stone for Pontcysyllte was laid on 25 July 1795, although the committee did not formally approve the new plans until 10 August.

Again, the company was keen to get trade moving on the canal, and pressed on with the line from Chirk to Frankton. The Vron Ironworks were at Chirk, with coal mines nearby, and goods from Ruabon could also be brought there by road, until the canal was completed. Work started on the Chirk aqueduct in January 1796, and when finished, it was 600 feet (180 m) long with ten arches, each with a span of 40 feet (12 m), carrying the canal 70 feet (21 m) above the Afon Ceiriog. It was constructed with a cast-iron bottom to the trough, but the sides were of masonry, an unusual choice given the decision to use a cast-iron trough at Pontcysyllte. The 8-mile (13 km) section from Chirk to Frankton included six locks and was completed in 1801. The section onwards through Chirk and Whitehouses tunnels, to reach the southern end of Pontcysyllte, opened in June 1802. The section over Pontcysyllte aqueduct and to Trevor opened in 1805.

In July 1795, the company hired contractors to start work on the branch from Hordley, near Frankton locks, to Westoncommon, which was completed in 1797. A wharf, public house, stables and other features were constructed near Westoncommon, and four lime kilns were built, to burn lime from Llanymynech using coal from Chirk. Plans for this branch to continue onwards to Shrewsbury were dropped, because lime from Weston would have to compete with that brought along the Shrewsbury Canal, and coal to supply the domestic market at Shrewsbury would not be available until Pontcysyllte aqueduct was completed. It did not appear that the route would be profitable, and this remained true when the plans were reconsidered subsequently.

=== Joining the two halves ===
Plans for joining the southern sections to the northern one were revisited by Telford in 1795, and after approval by Jessop, were authorised by act of Parliament, the Ellesmere and Chester Canal Act 1796 (36 Geo. 3. c. 71). They involved a heavily engineered line from Trevor to Chester, via Ruabon to the Dee at Chester, with a branch to Coed Talon, which would serve the Brymbo ironworks near Ffrwd. Locks would lift the line by 76 feet (23 m) from Trevor basin to Plas Kynaston, after which it would run on the level to Poolmouth and the junction with the Coed Talon Branch. It would then descend through a long flight of locks, roughly following the line of the later Chester to Wrexham railway, to enter the Dee opposite the branch to the Chester Canal. A second branch would run from Pulford to Farndon and Holt. Just over 2 miles (3.2 km) of the Coed Talon branch was built, to a basin near Ffrwd, and although it was filled with water, it seems that it was never used, and was filled in again from 1809.

In early 1794, a shareholder and a local landowner took out a patent for a canal lift, and offered to build a trial one. If it proved successful, then the Ellesmere company would pay for it, and if not, the inventors would meet the costs. A site was chosen on the proposed line, and by May 1796, it was ready for trials to begin. John Rennie and Jessop examined it, but like several similar ideas of the time, it was not felt to be robust enough to withstand the rigours of daily use. The company eventually paid £200 to the inventors, one quarter of the actual costs. Jessop decided in 1800 that the route between Trevor and Chester should be abandoned, due to the changes in circumstances, and coal being available in Chester from a number of other locations.

The Chester Canal, which had not been a financial success, had hoped that links with the Ellesmere Canal would improve their prospects, but when the Ellesmere and Chester Canal Act 1796 had failed to mention any connection with the Chester Canal, they had taken action, and had cut off the water supply to the northern section from Chester to Ellesmere Port. When agreement was reached on a new line from Frankton Junction to Whitchurch, the water supply was reinstated, and work on the new line started in February 1797. The work was difficult, as it had to cross Whixall Moss, and a 261-foot (80 m) tunnel was required near Ellesmere. It also included a branch to Prees Higher Heath, but only 3.75 miles (6 km) of this was built, terminating at Quina Brook, where the company built some limekilns. By 1804, the main line had reached Tilstock Park, some 4 miles (6.4 km) short of Whitchurch. Further agreement had been reached in 1802 on a route from Tilstock Park to Hurleston Junction, on which work started immediately. It was completed on 25 March 1805.

In order to keep the system supplied with water, the Ellesmere Canal, Railway and Water Supply Act 1804 (44 Geo. 3. c. liv) had authorised the construction of a navigable feeder from the north end of Pontcysyllte aqueduct to Llangollen and onwards to Llantisilo, where the Horseshoe Falls weir would be constructed on the River Dee. Once this opened in 1808, the system was not short of water. The Ellesmere company attempted to buy out the Chester Canal in 1804, but the offer had been refused. In 1813, they agreed to an amalgamation, on terms much worse than those offered in 1804, and the two companies became one from 1 July 1813.

The network expanded with the opening of the Middlewich Branch on 1 September 1833, and the completion on the Birmingham and Liverpool Junction Canal from Nantwich Basin to Autherley on 2 March 1835. In May 1845, the Ellesmere and Chester Canal Company obtained an act of Parliament, the Ellesmere and Chester Canal Company Act 1845 (8 & 9 Vict. c. ii), to enable them to absorb the Birmingham and Liverpool Junction Canal, the Montgomeryshire Canal, the Shrewsbury Canal and the Shropshire Canal. The name was changed to the Shropshire Union Railways and Canal Company in 1846, with powers to build a number of railways or convert their canals into railways, but this vision was short-lived, and they agreed to a lease with the London and North Western Railway in late 1846. The Shropshire Union Railways and Canal Lease Act 1847 (10 & 11 Vict. c. cxxi) was obtained to authorise this, but was not formally enacted until 1857. This ended their aspirations to build railways, but they remained remarkably independent despite railway control. The Shropshire Union was absorbed by the London and North Western Railway in late 1922, which itself became part of the London Midland and Scottish Railway soon afterwards.

=== Decline ===
After the takeover by the London Midland and Scottish Railway, regular maintenance was often not carried out, and gradually the canals silted up, so that boats could not operate with full loads. Traffic declined, and was significantly affected by a breach that occurred at the Perry Aqueduct, about 1 mile (1.6 km) to the south of Frankton locks, which effectively closed the Montgomeryshire Canal to all traffic. Traffic beyond Frankton to Llangollen had ceased in 1937, and the Frankton to Hurleston section was not used after 1939. The London Midland and Scottish Railway (Canals) Act 1944 (7 & 8 Geo. 6 c. ii) sanctioned abandonment in 1944, allowing the railway company to close 175 miles (282 km) of canals, including much of the Shropshire Union system. However, the line from Hurleston to Llangollen and onwards to Llantisilio was saved, as it was the main supply of water to the rest of the system.

On 6 September 1945, due to inadequate maintenance, the canal breached its banks east of Llangollen near Sun Bank Halt. The flow of hundreds of tons of water washed away the embankment of the railway further down the hill, creating a crater which was 40 yards (37 m) long and 50 feet (15 m) deep. This caused the first traffic of the morning, a mail and goods train composed of 16 carriages and two vans, to crash into the breach, killing one and injuring two engine crew. Despite the canal being officially closed, the breach was repaired, so that water could continue to reach the main line at Hurleston. The use of the canal as a water supply channel was further bolstered by an agreement with what became the Mid and South-East Cheshire Water Board, who used it to supply water to their Hurleston reservoir, and agreed to maintain it.

=== Incidents ===
1. Flap bridge; 2. Temporary barriers; 3. Dried-up area; 4. Breach area; 52.9697°N 2.7043°W

In the early hours of 22 December 2025 a bank failure appeared under the Hurleston to Frankton section of the canal and drained an estimated 1 million imperial gallons (4.5 million litres) of water. Two narrowboats were left at the bottom of the failure with two more left on the edge. The residents of these four boats were safely evacuated and no casualties were recorded. The Canal & River Trust have closed the canal between bridges 31A and 28 (Lock 6 Grindley Brook Locks).

== Restoration ==
Although there had been little traffic since the end of the First World War, the channel had remained watered, because it supplied the main line of the Shropshire Union Canal. In the period after the Second World War, there was growing interest in using the canals for leisure cruising, and the pioneer Tom Rolt attempted to cruise the canal in 1947. Rolt's boat was Cressy, which had been converted at Frankton to steam power, and on which Rolt had sailed westwards from Frankton Junction with Kyrle Willans after its conversion in 1930. At that time they had failed to reach Pontcysyllte. On this occasion, he was joined by a small cruiser named Heron, crewed by the Grundy family from Liverpool. The state of the canal was poor, and several of the locks were disintegrating, but despite low water levels and thick weed growth, both boats eventually reached Ellesmere. They then found that the water supply had been cut off due to a broken culvert near Chirk. After several weeks of being stranded, Rolt talked to the Chester office, and they arranged for water to be let down the canal, to enable the boats to return to Hurleston. On a second attempt two years later, Rolt and his wife reached Pontcysyllte, which they crossed accompanied by the actor Hugh Griffith and his wife Gunde. The Rolts moored for nearly three months just beyond the aqueduct, near the site where their boat had been built during the First World War. In August they were joined by Geoffrey Calvert and his family, who were attempting to reach the top of the canal in a home-made boat, Wagtail, which was pulled by a donkey. The Rolts travelled with them for part of the journey. Edward Wilson, another canal enthusiast, reached Trevor in his boat in 1952, and the Inland Waterways Association held a rally at Llangollen later that year.

By 1954, the Llangollen Canal was in a curious position. Under the terms of the London Midland and Scottish Railway (Canals) Act 1944 (8 & 9 Geo. 6. c. ii), navigation had been abandoned, but the right to sell water had been retained. This was to be for a period of ten years, during which those who bought the water were required to make alternative arrangements, which they failed to do. Since the nationalisation of the canals in 1948, the canal had been managed by the British Transport Commission, who had to obtain parliamentary approval to extend this arrangement. Meanwhile, a number of pleasure boats had ventured onto the canal, and there was a growing campaign to reopen the canal for navigation. A committee to spearhead this had been formed, and was chaired by the clerk for Wrexham Rural District Council, Trevor Williams. More than thirty other organisations were supporting the move, including the British Travel and Holidays Association.

In 1955, the Board of Survey, a committee chaired by Lord Rusholme, had produced a report on the future of the canals under the control of the British Transport Commission, which they had divided into three categories. There were 336 miles (541 km) of 'waterways to be developed', another 994 miles (1,600 km) of 'waterways to be retained', and finally 771 miles (1,241 km) of 'waterways having insufficient commercial prospects to justify their retention for navigation'. The Llangollen Canal was placed in the latter category, since it was still officially disused. This was followed in 1958 by the Bowes Report, which suggested that the first two categories should be classified as Class A and Class B waterways, with Class B waterways put back into good working order and retained for 25 years, to attract private investment. The Llangollen Canal was still in the final category, but the report at least suggested that there should be a right of appeal against closure, and gave the first hints that such canals could be retained because of their social value for recreation. After the British Waterways Board took over responsibility for the canal from the British Transport Commission, the section from Hurleston Junction to Llangollen was officially called the Llangollen Canal from 1963.

Hugh McKnight, the editor of the Inland Waterways Association's Bulletin, wrote an optimistic report in 1966, pointing to the achievements of the first 20 years of the organisation's existence, mentioning the changes in public opinion concerning the canals, and pointing particularly to the growth in leisure use on the Llangollen Canal and the Oxford Canal. Official attitudes changed, and under the provisions of the Transport Act 1968 the British Waterways Board were tasked with maintaining, developing and running the canals for the benefit of users. The whole of the branch from Hurleston Junction to Llantisilio, just below Horseshoe Falls, was listed in the act of Parliament as a cruising waterway, meaning that its future was no longer in jeopardy. As use by leisure craft grew, the "Llangollen Branch of the Shropshire Union" became popular due to its aqueducts and scenery. The canal was later renamed the Llangollen Canal, becoming one of the most popular canals for holidaymakers in Britain. The name is now used for the entire route from Hurleston to Llangollen, even though it was never described in this way during its commercial life. It is not entirely clear when the name was first applied, since it was listed as the "Welsh Canal", a branch of the Shropshire Union, in 1985. At that time, potential boaters were advised that the canal was a water supply channel, and that they should submit an application containing full details and dimensions of their boat if they wanted to cruise on it. Nevertheless, they were instructed that British Waterways were keen to see leisure use of the canal, and that it could be quite congested in the summer season. Its origins as parts of two separate canals can be seen from the fact that the bridges are numbered from 1 at Hurleston to 70 at Rowsons Bridge, just past Frankton Junction. Continuing along the route to Llangollen, bridge numbering restarts at 1, while bridges 71 and upwards continue along what is now the Montgomery Canal, but was formerly the Ellesmere Branch to Llanymynech, where it joined the Montgomeryshire Canal.

A notable feature of the canal is the Pontcysyllte Aqueduct, designed by Thomas Telford and approved by William Jessop Opened in 1805, the aqueduct is 1,007 feet (307 m) long and 126 feet (38 m) above the valley floor. It has 18 hollow stone piers, which support 19 cast iron arches, each with a 45-foot (14 metre) span, to support the cast iron trough. William Hazeldinesupplied and erected the cast iron, while the masonry was erected by John Simpson. Chirk Aqueduct is shorter at 710 feet (220 m) long. It has ten stone arches which carry the canal over the River Ceiriog at Chirk, spanning the border between Wales and England. There are tunnels nearby at Whitehouses, Chirk, and Ellesmere.

The canal also forms the boundary on two sides of the Fenn's, Whixall and Bettisfield Mosses National Nature Reserve. In 2009 an 11-mile (18 km) section of the canal from Gledrid Bridge near Rhoswiel through to the Horseshoe Falls, which includes Chirk Aqueduct and Pontcysyllte Aqueduct, was declared a World Heritage Site by UNESCO.

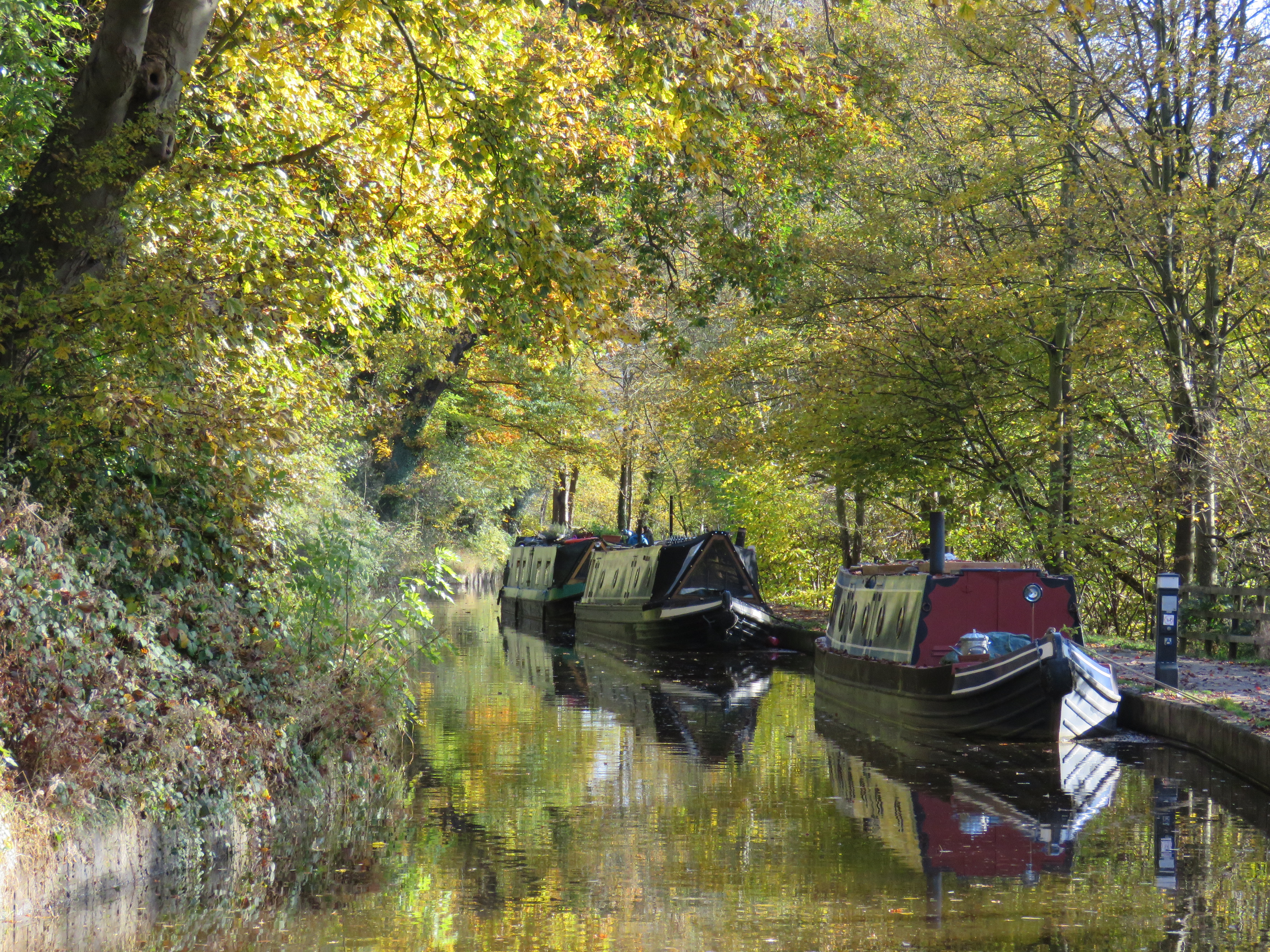

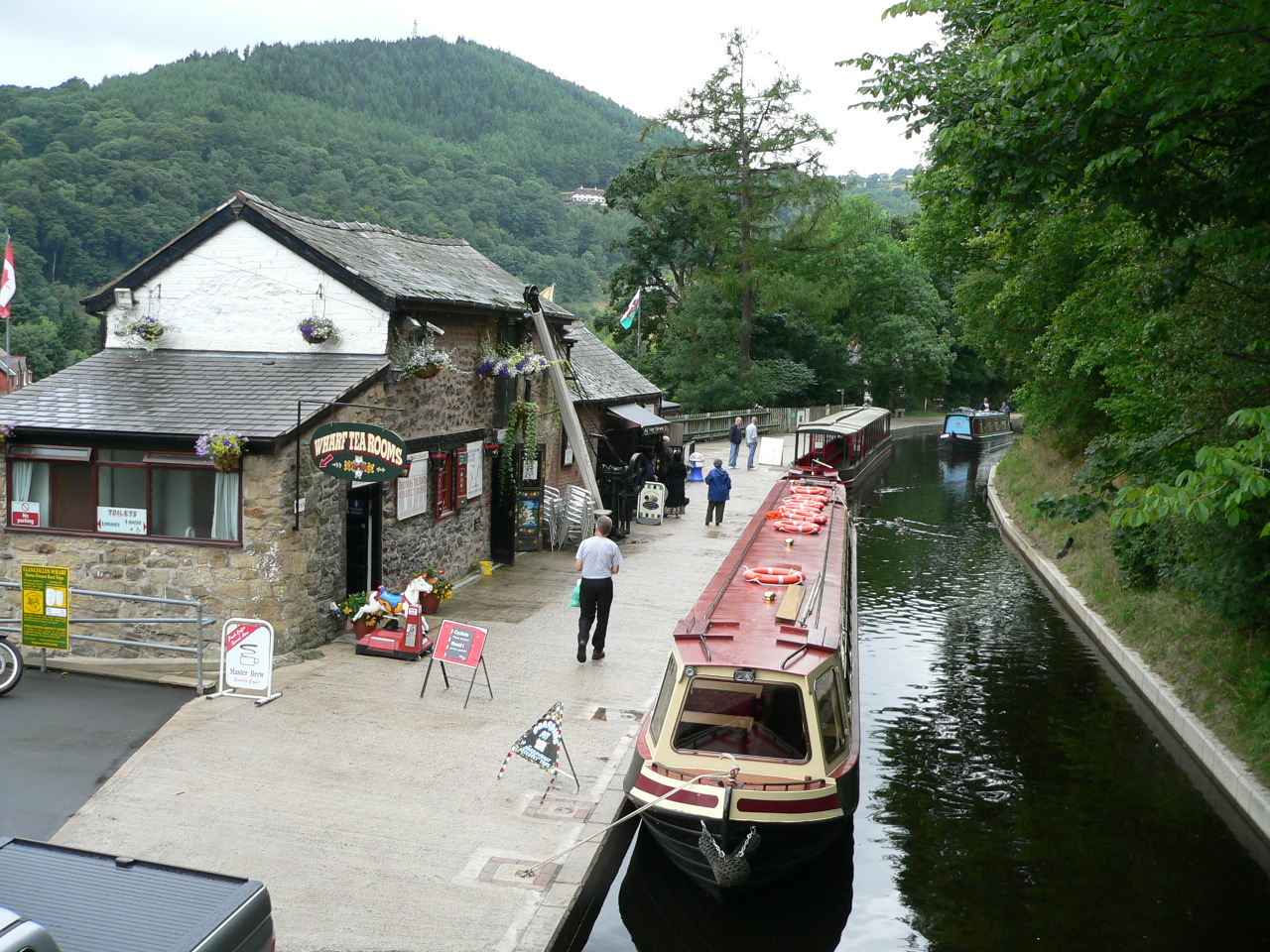
Llangollen canal wharf.

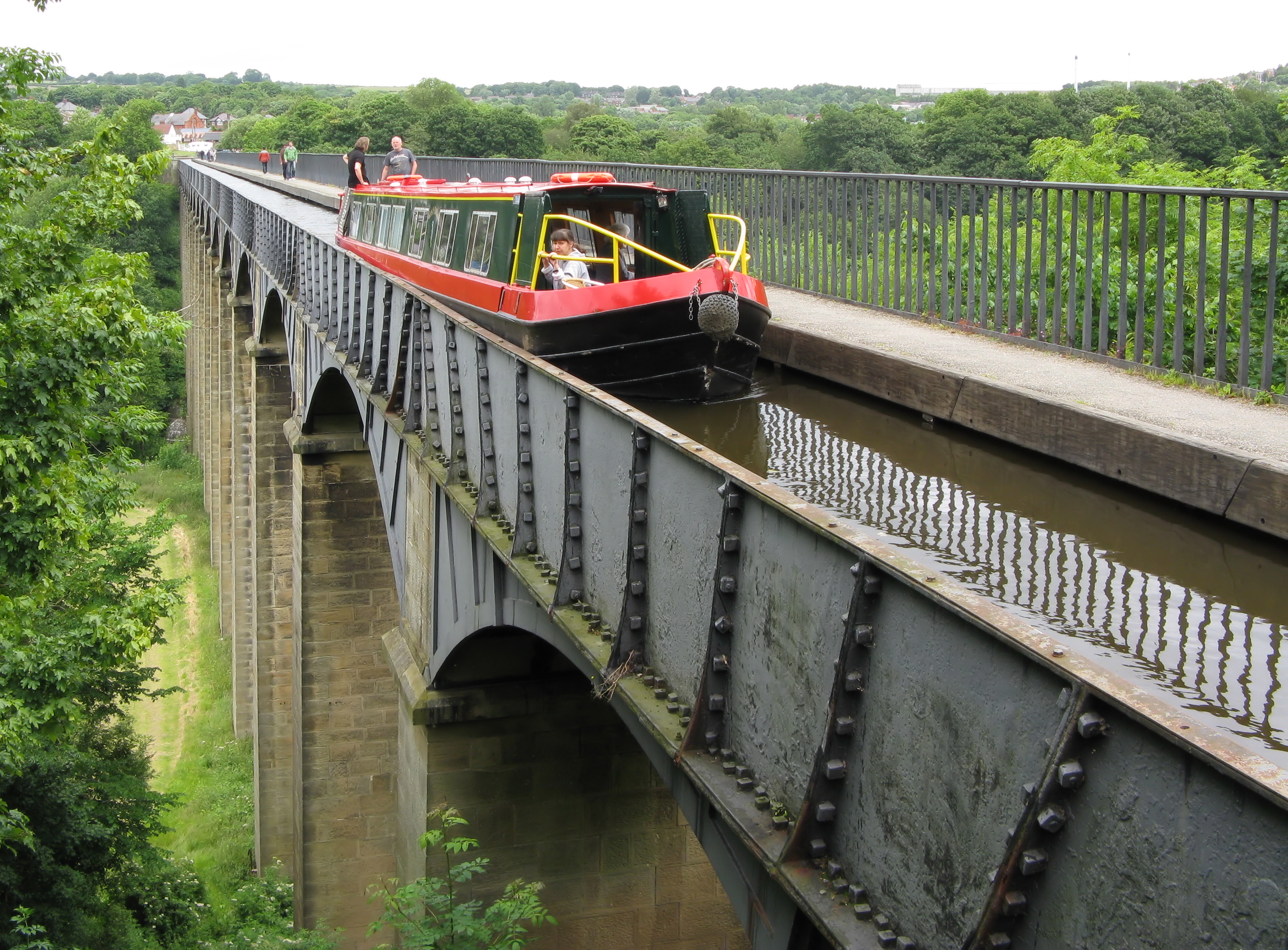
A narrowboat traverses the Pontcysyllte Aqueduct.

== Route ==
=== Hurleston to Frankton Junction ===
The canal at Hurleston Junction rises from the Shropshire Union Canal main line, through four adjacent locks, with a total rise of 34 feet 3 inches (10.44 m). The canal had been an early pioneer in the use of iron lock gates, instead of the more traditional wooden ones, and this material was first used on the locks at Frankton in 1819. The four locks here have a mixture of wooden and metal gates. All were built by the engineer J Fletcher around 1805. Lock 1 has metal lower gates, and a wooden upper gate, while gates at both ends of lock 2 are made of metal. The metal gates on both locks were replaced in 1974. Locks 3 and 4 have a single metal gate at the upper end, and wooden mitre gates at the lower end. Like many of the structures on the canal, they are grade II listed structures.

Beside the locks is Hurleston Reservoir, which has a capacity of 85 million imperial gallons (390 Ml). It is supplied with water that flows down the canal from Horseshoe Falls at Llantisilio, and is used both for drinking water and to supply the main line of the Shropshire Union Canal. Water enters it through a side channel with sluices and a weir, just above lock number 4. The treatment works on the west bank is now operated by United Utilities, and was given a £6 million upgrade in 2003.

Just beyond the A534 Wrexham Road bridge is the entrance to Swanley Bridge Marina, on the west bank of the canal. It has moorings for over 300 boats, and is situated in 250 acres (100 ha) of farmland, which includes a 7-acre (2.8 ha) wood with nature trails. It opened in September 2006, and was built in response to a document published by British Waterways in the spring of that year, which outlined development opportunities for farmers and landowners adjacent to the canal.

The two Swanley locks raise the level of the canal by another 12 feet 10 inches (3.91 m), and by the upper lock is the grade II listed Swanley Hall, a red-brick farmhouse parts of which date from the early 16th century. Baddiley Hall, which has three storeys and an attic, and dates from the late 17th century, is set some distance back from the canal. In its grounds is the grade I listed parish church of St. Michael, the chancel of which dates from 1308, while the nave dates from 1811. Both are separated from the canal by a scheduled monument site, containing the earthworks and buried remains of an abandoned medieval village. The three Baddiley locks follow, with a combined rise of 19 feet 8 inches (5.99 m).

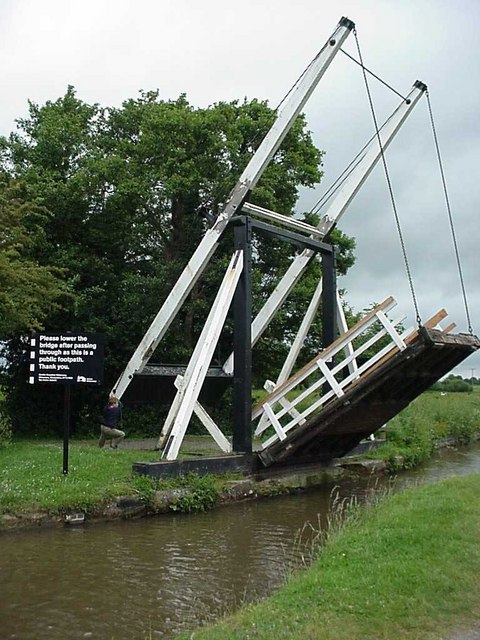
Wrenbury Church lift bridge is one of three in the village.

After passing Wrenbury Hall, on the west bank, the canal turns to the west, and is crossed by the Wrenbury Church lift bridge, the first of three lift-bridges in the village. It is formed of timber planks fixed between wooden beams, and the bridge deck is hinged at the northern end. A weighted counterbalance allows the bridge to be opened, and the structure is grade II* listed. Wrenbury lift bridge, No. 20, is automated, with push-button controls. It is operated by use of a British Waterways key, and involves closing barriers and stopping traffic on a sometimes-busy road. Wrenbury Wharf is next to the bridge, where the former mill building has been reused by a boatyard, and a nearby warehouse has become a pub.

At Grindley Brook, the canal was crossed by the defunct Whitchurch and Tattenhall Railway. The railway and the nearby Grindley Brook Halt railway station closed in 1957, and goods traffic ceased in 1963, but the massive embankments and bridge remain. Immediately afterwards, the canal passes through three locks and a three-chamber staircase lock, attended during summer months by a lock keeper. The six locks raise the level of the canal by 38 feet 11 inches (11.86 m). After another mile (1.6 km), there is a lift bridge just before the entrance to the Whitchurch Arm, which served the town of Whitchurch. Part of it remains open, and is used for moorings. The section from the main line to Sherryman's Bridge was opened on 6 July 1808, and in 1811 a further extension into the town reached Castle Well. The arm remained closed when the canal reopened in the 1950s, but Whitchurch Town Council looked at ways of bringing boats back into the town in the early 1980s and the embryonic Whitchurch Waterway Trust was formed in 1986, with the aim of reopening the arm, of which around 0.75 miles (1.21 km) was left, the rest having been built over in the 1950s. This was achieved in October 1993, and the trust are hopeful that a new route into the town can be constructed.

Between bridges 42 and 47, the canal skirts the eastern edge and then passes through and the southern edge of Whixall Moss, part of the Fenn's, Whixall and Bettisfield Mosses National Nature Reserve. With a combined area of nearly 2,500 acres (10 km^{2}), they form the third largest area of raised peat bog in the United Kingdom. The reserve is also a designated Site of Special Scientific Interest, a European Special Area of Conservation and a Wetland of International Importance under the Ramsar Convention. The bogs were drained using powers enshrined in Enclosure Acts dating from 1777 and 1823, and further drainage took place when the canal was built in 1804, and again in 1863 when a railway was built along the north-western margins. Commercial peat cutting using mechanised cutters began in 1968, but extraction ceased in 1990.

The technical difficulties of cutting a canal through Whixall Moss were many, but Jessop and Telford decided on a direct route across the moss, rather than building a bypass that skirted round the edge of the area. The water table in the Moss was lowered by drainage and a raft was constructed, on which the canal was built. The canal had to float across the peat, and the engineers understood that regular maintenance of this section would be a requirement for many years. They employed a team of navvies to build up the banks with more clay on a continuous basis, who became known as the Whixall Moss Gang. Clay was obtained from the clay pit which became Whixall Marina, and was transferred to the work site in horse-drawn barges. Men were employed on this work from 1804 until 1960, working five and a half days a week, and became the longest serving group of navvies ever to work on the British canals. In the 1960s, the engineering issues that created the work were solved, and they were all laid off. The solution adopted to prevent the canal sinking further into the peat was to underpin the whole section with steel piling.

Adjacent to bridge 46 is Whixall Moss Junction leading to the Prees Branch. Two breaches of the canal have occurred near Whixall in recent years. The first was in 2004 at Hampton Bank, near bridge 50, when badgers burrowed into the bank, causing it to fail. The animals were also implicated in a breach some 440 yards (400 m) to the east of Cornhill Bridge 47, which occurred in late 2009. The bank failed as new piling was being driven in, but had previously been weakened by burrowing.

As the canal approaches Ellesmere, it passes a series of meres. Cole Mere is very close to the south bank of the canal, but at a lower level. Blake Mere is on the towpath side, with only the towpath separating it from the canal in places. Both are surrounded by woods, and the canal is fringed by oak trees, many planted by the Shropshire Union Company to ensure that they had supplies of timber to replace their fleet of wooden boats as that became necessary. At the far end of Blake Mere is the short Ellesmere Tunnel, just 87 yards (80 m) long, and beyond that the market town of Ellesmere. A short branch leads into the town, at the end of which is a three-storey, red brick warehouse, dating from the early 19th century, which is grade II listed. At the junction is a Canal and River Trust maintenance depot, housed in a series of buildings which are all grade II* listed. The complex includes Beech House, the offices of the Ellesmere Canal Company from 1806, but now converted into flats. The range of buildings form the best-preserved canal maintenance yard in Britain. The former stables and stores, which are now used as offices, include an exceptionally early example of a covered dry dock, in which barges were built and repaired. It predates the better known examples of covered slips at the naval dockyards of Devonport and Chatham.

The canal also passes through Burland, Quoisley Bridge, and Bettisfield.

=== Prees Branch ===
The Prees Arm of the canal was originally intended to reach Prees, but only the first 3.75 miles (6.04 km) were constructed, terminating at Quina Brook. Much of the ground through which it passed is formed of peat. Today it is only open for 7 furlongs (1.4 km), with two lift bridges, to a marina at the end of the navigable part; beyond that, another 0.62 miles (1 km), as far as Waterloo Bridge, is partially watered and forms the Prees Branch Canal Nature Reserve. The remaining 2 miles (3.2 km) is dry, but can be followed in the landscape as most of it is marked by trees growing along its course. The towpath is on the eastern bank from the junction to Dobson's Bridge, and then crosses over to the other side, where it remained to the end of the canal at Quina Brook.

Next to the junction is a toll-keeper's cottage dating from around 1800, the time of the construction of the canal. It has since been reused as a farmhouse. Allman's Bridge dates from the construction of the canal, although there have been some later repairs to the structure. The wooden decking is opened by a counterweight and chains. It was one of the last manual lift bridges to be converted to hydraulic operation in 2010. Nearby is a single arched squinch bridge, again dating from the early 1800s and constructed in red bricks. It crosses a drainage ditch, probably associated with the drainage of Whixall Moss, which passes under the canal at this point. Starks Bridge is another wooden lift bridge, and as well as being grade II* listed, is a scheduled ancient monument. It is a rare example of a skewed lift bridge. Dobson's Bridge, a fixed humpback bridge made of red bricks with an elliptical arch, was classified in 1987 as a Grade Il listed building.

At the end of the navigable section is Whixall Marina, which was constructed on the site of some clay pits, which for many years supplied clay used for puddling of the canals. From 2017 to 2018, the marina had been refurbished with the addition of a waterside cafe, car park and new shower and toilet facilities. It is also near the famous Whixall Moss which is used by many walkers. On the nature reserve section, Boodles Bridge is of similar construction and date to Dobson's Bridge. At the far end of the canal are the remains of two groups of limekilns, the main group consisting of four kilns built of red brick and sandstone rubble. They were built at the same time as the branch was constructed.

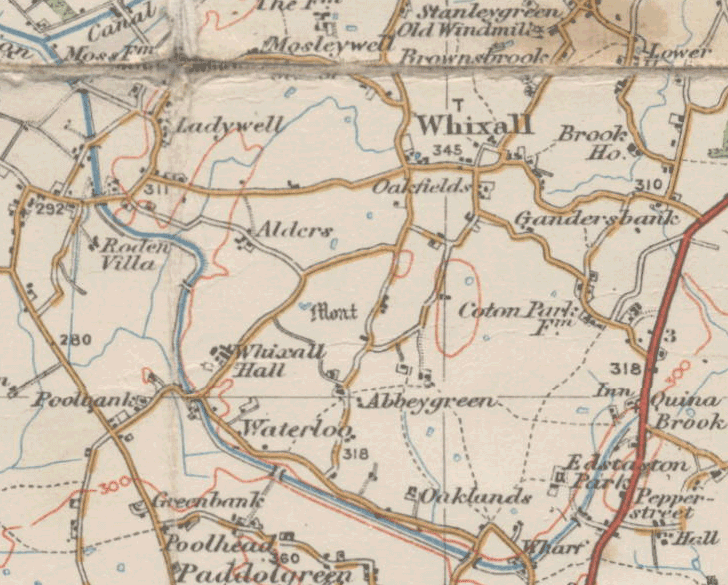
Old map showing the complete branch to Quina Brook

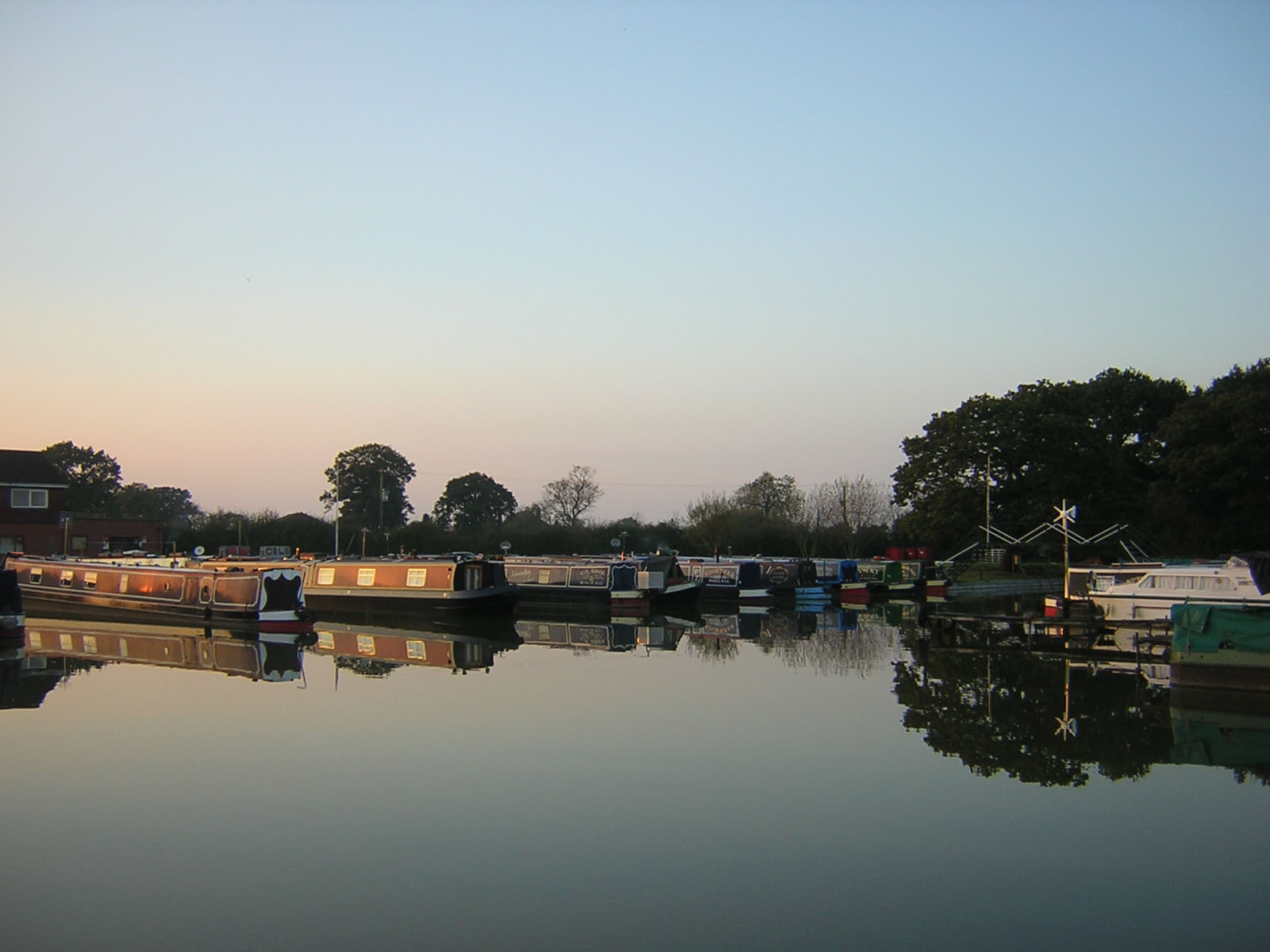
Evening over Whixall Marina

=== Frankton Junction to Trevor Basin ===
At Frankton Junction the Montgomery Canal, which is partially restored, heads southwards. For historic reasons the bridge numbering continues down the Montgomery Canal and a second bridge numbering series for the Llangollen Canal begins with Rowson's Bridge (which is numbered both 1W and 70). The "W" addition was part of a Minimum Safety Standards scheme instigated by British Waterways, to avoid possible confusion, especially for emergency services, of having different bridges on the same canal with the same number. British Waterways consulted with the Inland Waterways Association and the Shropshire Union Canal Society before finally deciding to add the "W", and at the same time as the numbers were altered, it ensured that all bridges carried a number on both sides. The work was due to be completed by July 2008, but there were delays due to manufacturing difficulties with the new castings.

The Llangollen Canal passes through Hindford, Saint Martin's, Preesgweene, Chirk Bank, Chirk and Froncysyllte, and includes the Chirk Aqueduct, the Chirk Tunnel and the Pontcysyllte Aqueduct.

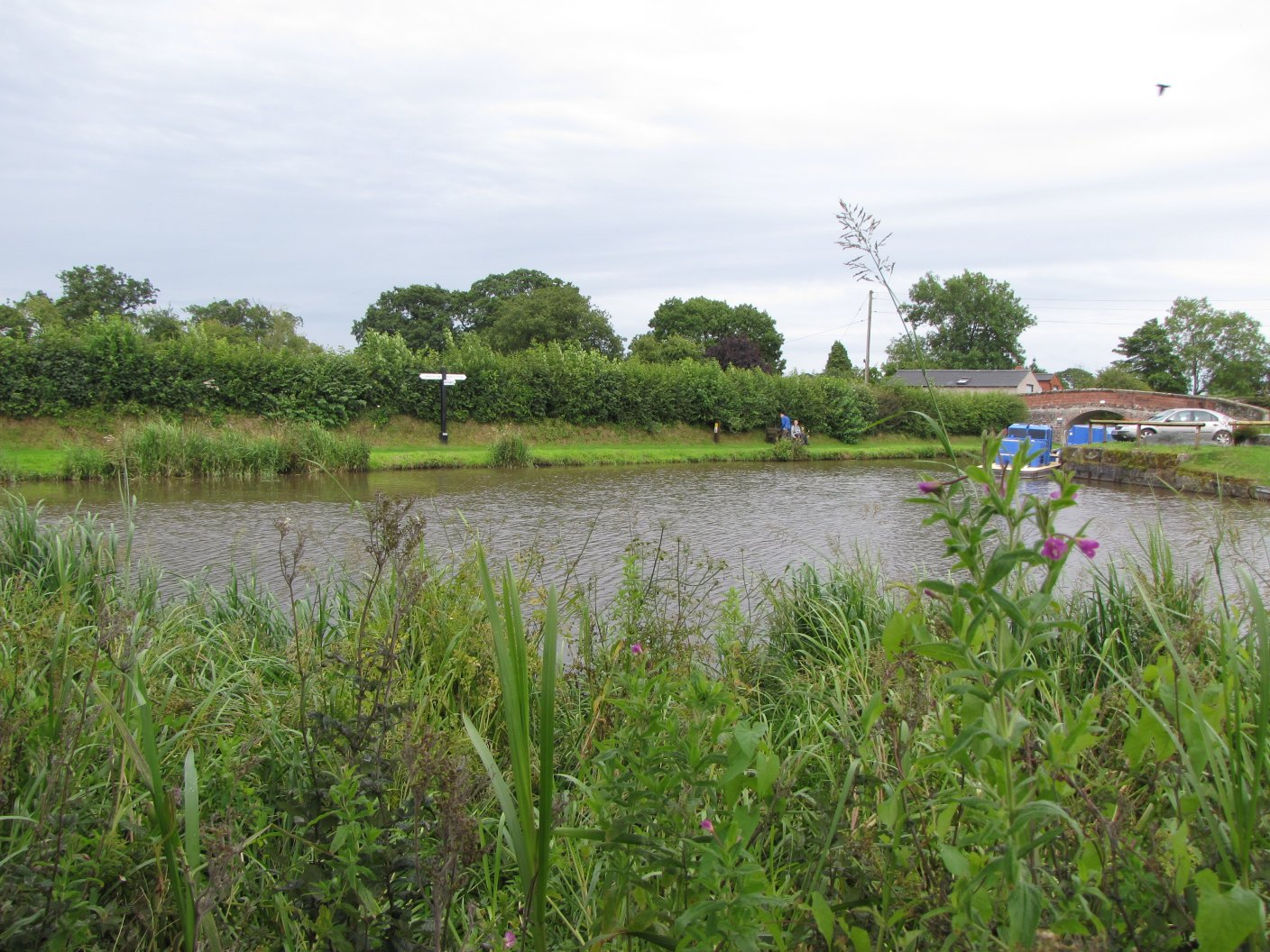
Frankton Junction

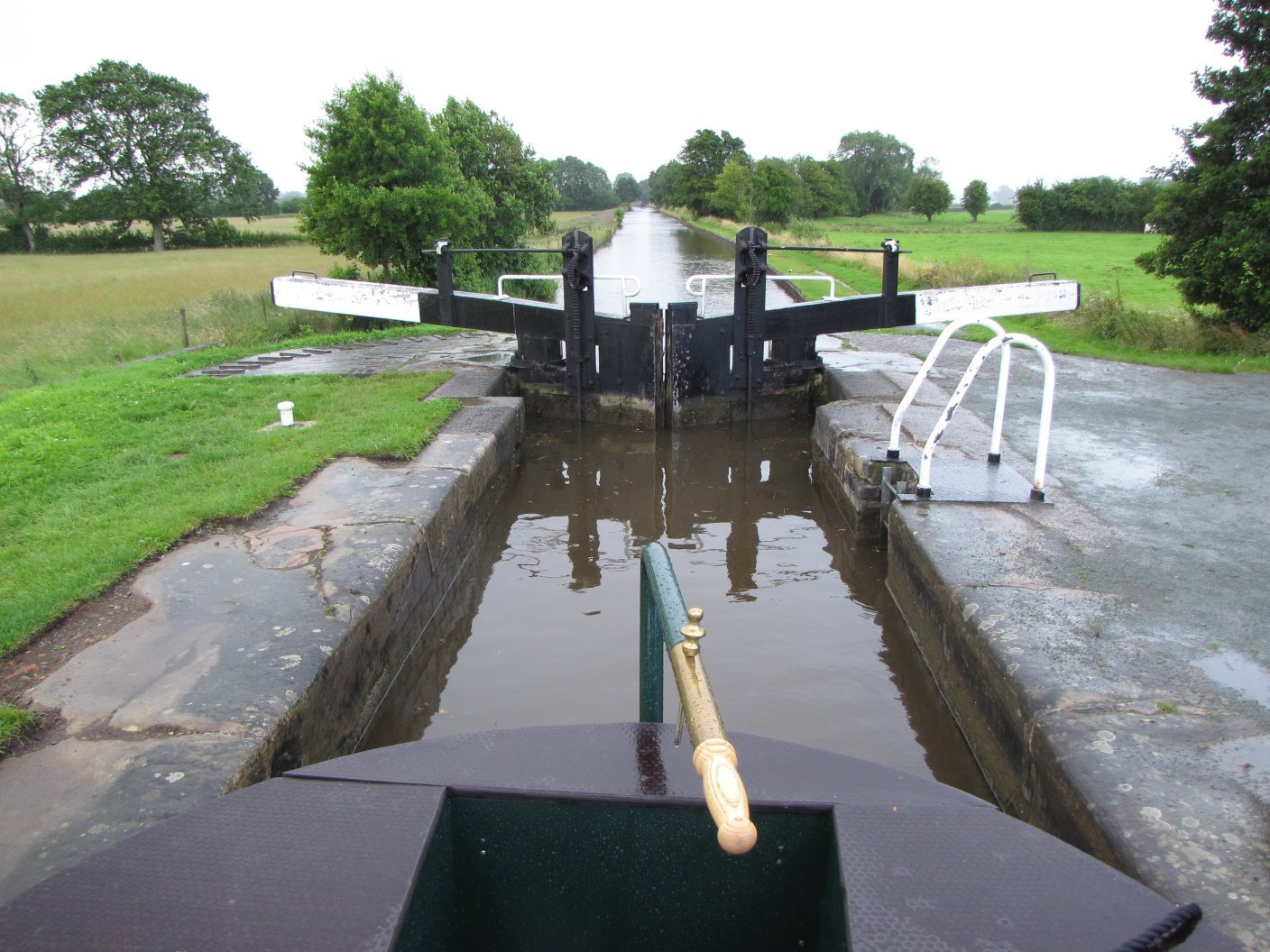
New Marton Bottom Lock

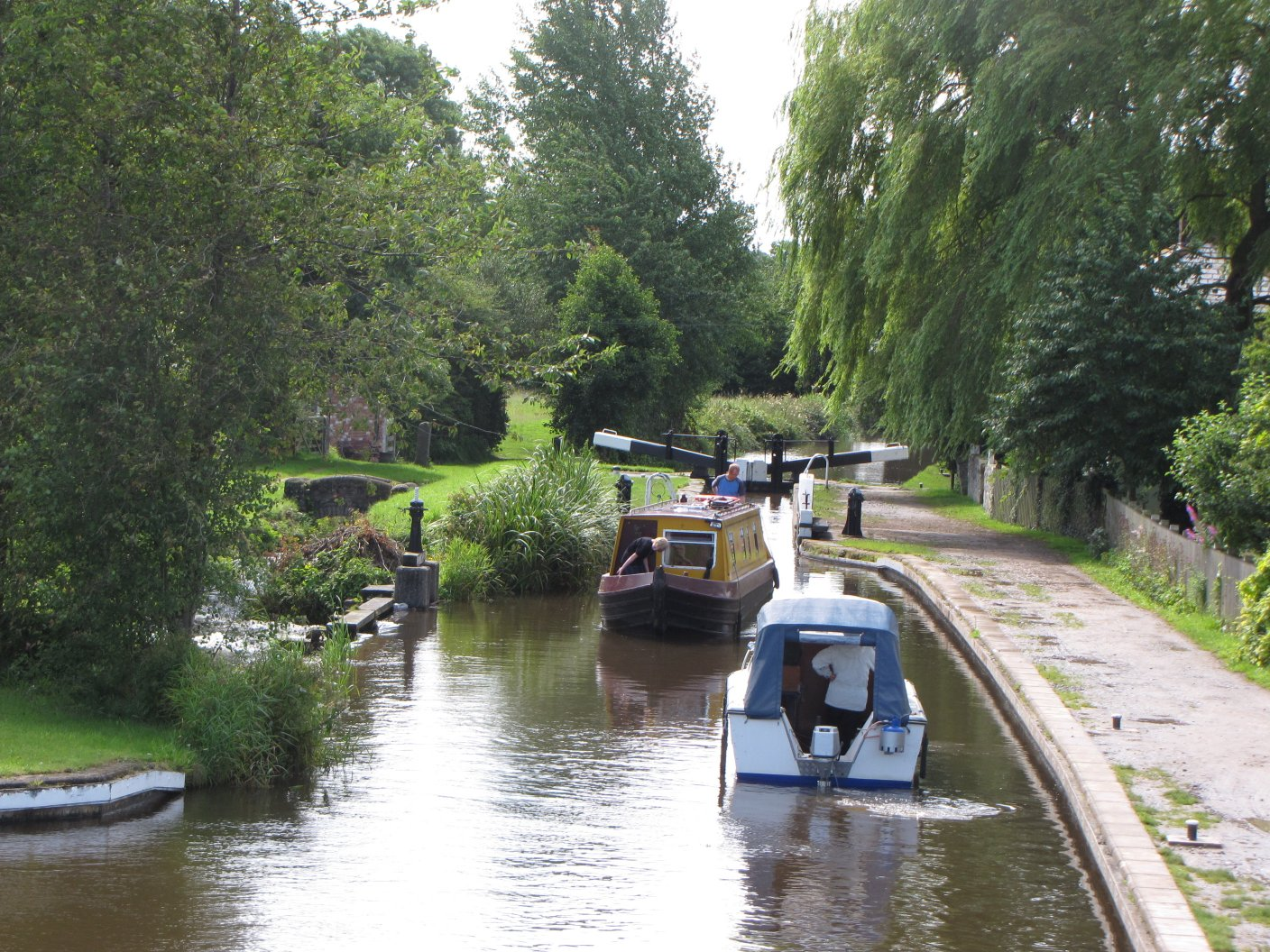
New Marton Top Lock

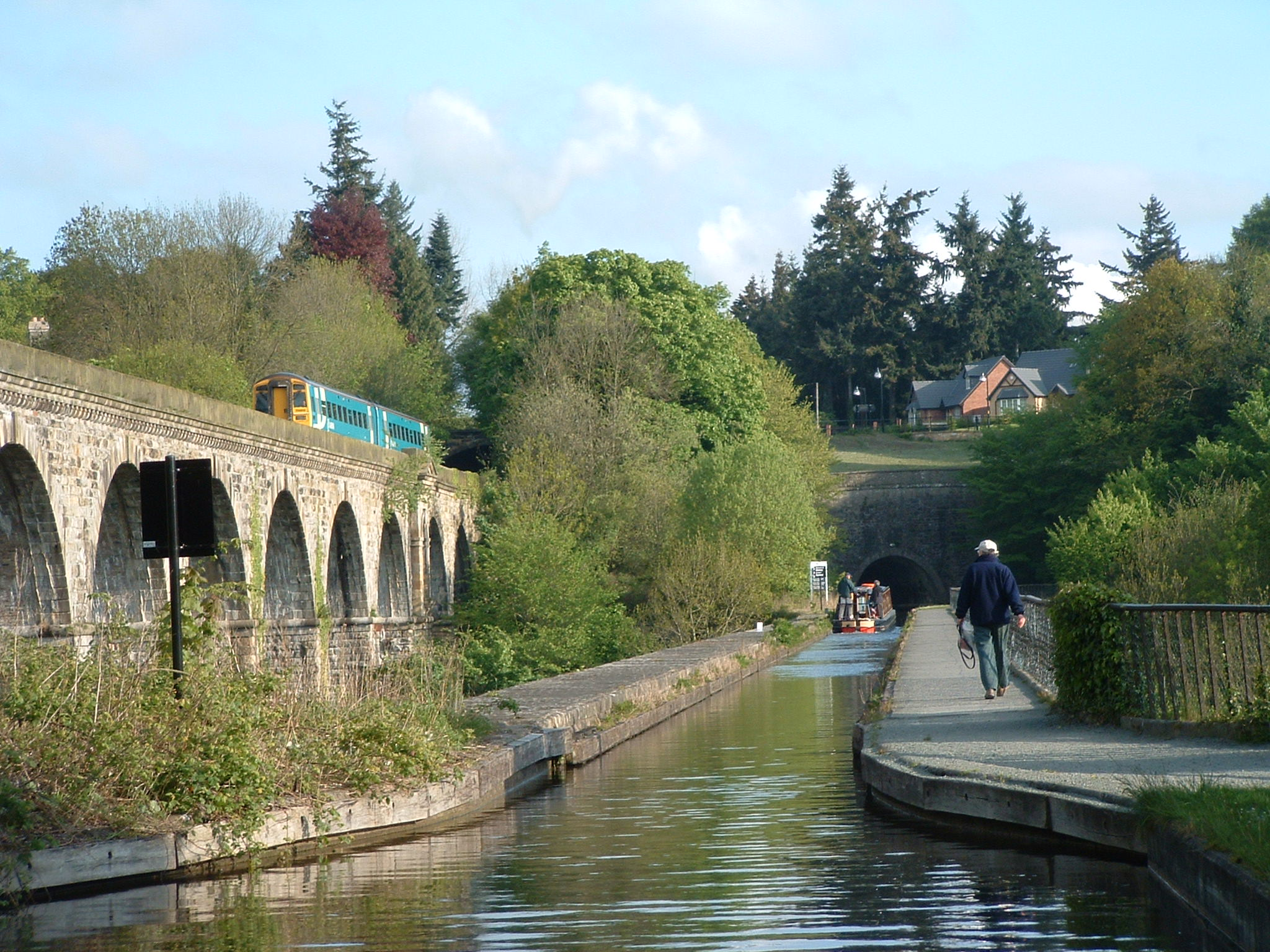
Chirk Aqueduct

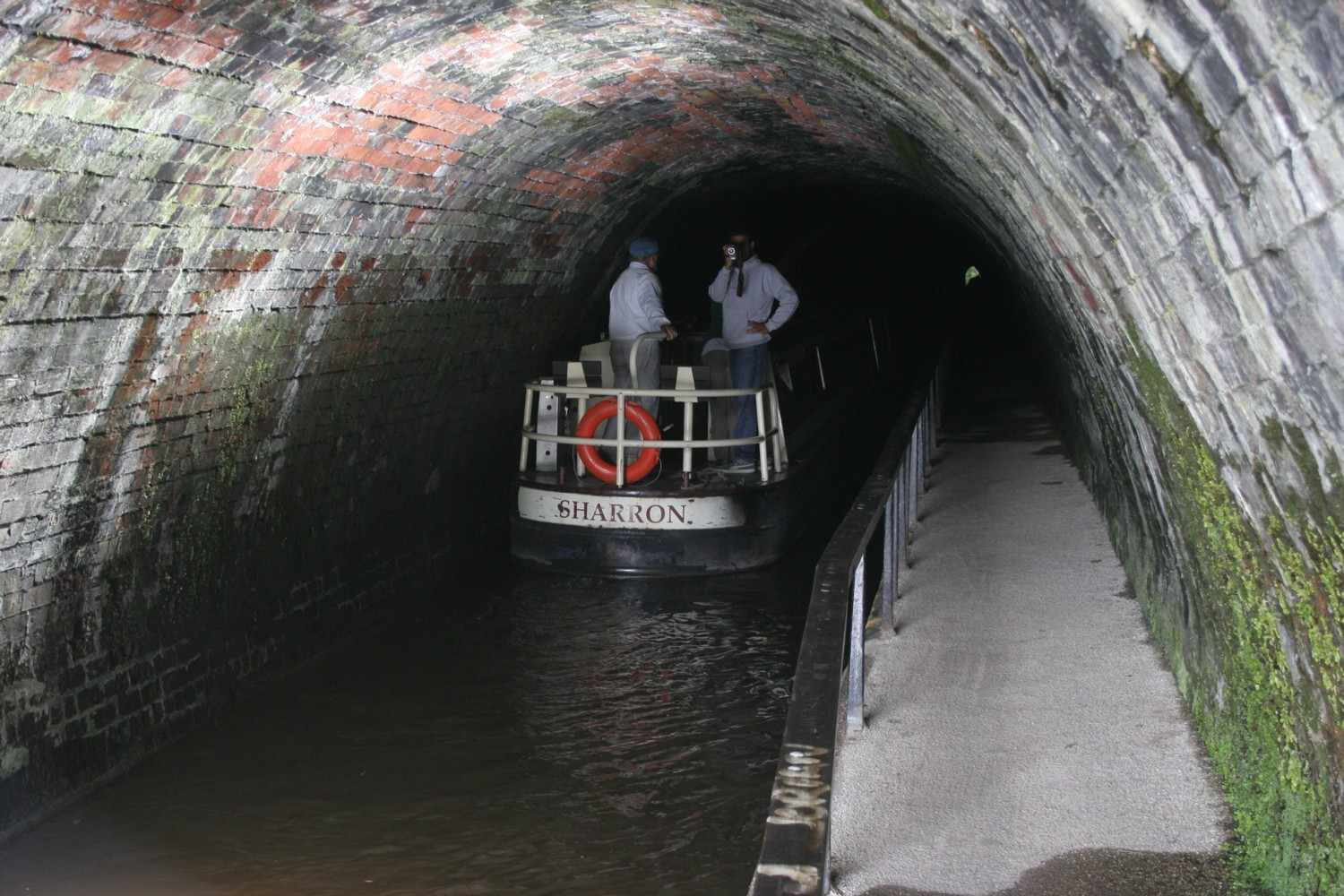
Chirk Tunnel

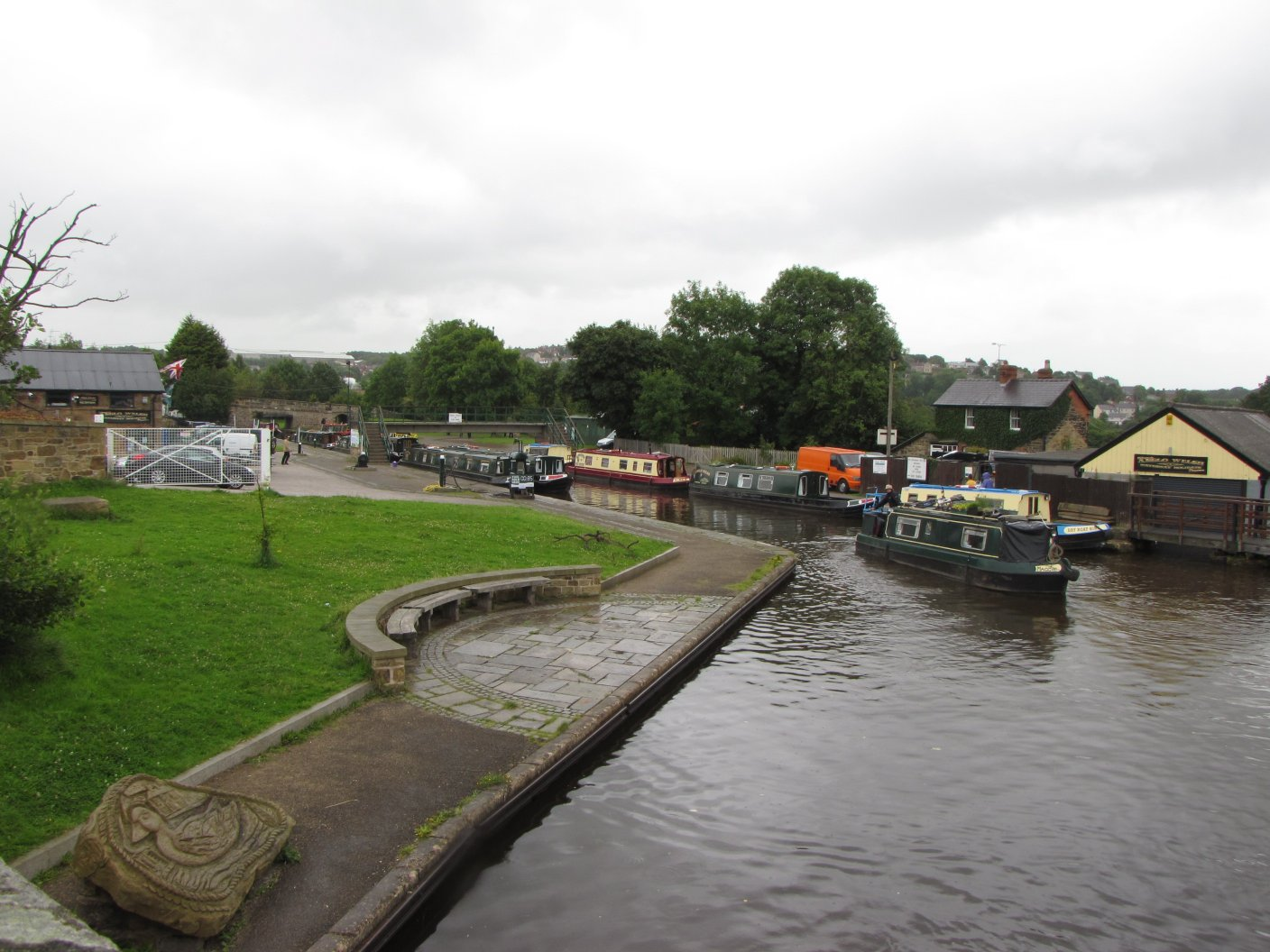
Trevor Basin

=== Trevor Basin to Horseshoe Falls ===
This section was built as a navigable feeder and is both shallow and narrow. Some sections near Llangollen are too narrow for boats to pass each other and it is necessary to scout ahead to check for oncoming boats. Navigation should not be attempted by boats with a draught of more than 21 inches (53 cm). A number of breaches had occurred on this final section over many years, and in the early 1980s, British Waterways initiated a programme to resolve this issue. Parts of it were rebuilt with a concrete lining, which included a waterproof membrane to retain the water, and a system of drainage pipes underneath the bed, to prevent water building up and damaging the construction.

Navigation by powered craft is prohibited beyond the entrance to Llangollen Marina and the final section is used only by horse drawn trip boats. The current boats maintain a long tradition, which was first offered to visitors in 1884. The towpath beside the feeder is in good condition, and walkers can reach the weir at Horseshoe Falls. British Waterways maintains a gravel shoal immediately upstream of the marina entrance past Llangollen Wharf. This maintains a draught which most narrowboats cannot pass, but which is passable by the shallow draughted trip boats.

In 2005, a marina was constructed by British Waterways, just upstream from Llangollen Wharf, to relieve the acute shortage of casual moorings, and provides 33 berths. About 100 yards (91 m) downstream of the wharf there are about a dozen visitor moorings complete with individual electricity and water pedestals at each. Similar pedestals have also been installed at the marina berths. Mooring in Llangollen is restricted to 48 hours, and a charge is made both at the marina and the visitor moorings, which are below bridge 45.

== See also ==
- Canals of the United Kingdom
- History of the British canal system
