= List of schools in Shropshire =

This is a list of schools in Shropshire, England.

== State-funded schools ==
=== Primary schools ===
- Adderley CE Primary School, Adderley
- Albrighton Primary School, Albrighton
- Alveley Primary School, Alveley
- Barrow 1618 CE Free School, Barrow
- Baschurch CE Primary School, Baschurch
- Beckbury CE Primary School, Beckbury
- Belvidere Primary School, Shrewsbury
- Bicton CE Primary School, Bicton
- Bishop Hooper CE Primary School, Ashford Carbonell
- Bishop's Castle Primary School, Bishop's Castle
- Bitterley CE Primary School, Bitterley
- Bomere Heath Primary School, Bomere Heath
- Bowbrook Primary School, Bowbrook
- Brockton CE Primary School, Brockton
- Broseley CE Primary School, Broseley
- Brown Clee CE Primary School, Ditton Priors
- Bryn Offa CE Primary School, Pant
- Buildwas Academy, Buildwas
- Buntingsdale Primary School, Ternhill
- Burford CE Primary School, Burford
- Castlefields Primary School, Oldbury
- Cheswardine Primary School, Cheswardine
- Chirbury CE Primary School, Chirbury
- Christ Church CE Primary School, Cressage
- Church Preen Primary School, Church Preen
- Claverley CE Primary School, Claverley
- Clee Hill Community Academy, Cleehill
- Cleobury Mortimer Primary School, Cleobury Mortimer
- Clive CE Primary School, Clive
- Clunbury CE Primary School, Clunbury
- Cockshutt CE Primary School, Cockshutt
- Coleham Primary School, Shrewsbury
- Condover CE Primary School, Condover
- Corvedale CE Primary School, Diddlebury
- Criftins CE Primary School, Criftins
- Crowmoor Primary School, Shrewsbury
- Ellesmere Primary School, Ellesmere
- Farlow CE Primary School, Farlow
- Gobowen Primary School, Gobowen
- Grange Primary School, Shrewsbury
- Greenacres Primary School, Shrewsbury
- Greenfields Primary School, Shrewsbury
- Hadnall CE Primary School, Hadnall
- Harlescott Junior School, Shrewsbury
- Highley Community Primary School, Highley
- Hinstock Primary School, Hinstock
- Hodnet Primary School, Hodnet
- Holy Trinity CE Primary Academy, Oswestry
- John Wilkinson Primary School, Broseley
- Kinlet CE Primary School, Kinlet
- Kinnerley CE Primary School, Kinnerley
- Long Mountain CE Primary School, Worthen
- Longden CE Primary School, Longden
- Longlands Primary School, Market Drayton
- Longnor CE Primary School, Longnor
- Lower Heath CE Primary School, Prees
- Ludlow Primary School, Ludlow
- Lydbury North CE Primary School, Lydbury North
- Market Drayton Infant School, Market Drayton
- Market Drayton Junior School, Market Drayton
- The Martin Wilson School, Shrewsbury
- The Meadows Primary School, Oswestry
- Meole Brace CE Primary School, Meole Brace
- Mereside CE Primary School, Shrewsbury
- Minsterley Primary School, Minsterley
- Morda CE Primary School, Morda
- Moreton Say CE Primary School, Moreton Say
- Morville CE Primary School, Morville
- Mount Pleasant Primary, Shrewsbury
- Much Wenlock Primary School, Much Wenlock
- Myddle CE Primary School, Myddle
- Newcastle CE Primary School, Newcastle
- Newtown CE Primary School, Newtown
- Norbury Primary School, Norbury
- Norton-in-Hales CE Primary School, Norton in Hales
- Oakmeadow CE Primary School, Bayston Hill
- Onny CE Primary School, Onibury
- Our Lady and St Oswald's RC Primary School, Oswestry
- Oxon CE Primary School, Shrewsbury
- Pontesbury CE Primary School, Pontesbury
- Prees CE Primary School, Prees
- Radbrook Primary School, Shrewsbury
- Rushbury CE Primary School, Rushbury
- St Andrew's CE Primary School, Nesscliffe
- St Andrew's CE Primary School, Shifnal
- St Edward's CE Primary School, Dorrington
- St George's CE Academy, Clun
- St George's Junior School, Shrewsbury
- St Giles CE Primary School, Shrewsbury
- St John the Baptist CE Primary School, Ruyton-XI-Towns
- St John's RC Primary School, Bridgnorth
- St Laurence CE Primary School, Ludlow
- St Lawrence Primary School, Church Stretton
- St Leonard's CE Primary School, Bridgnorth
- St Lucia's CE Primary School, Upton Magna
- St Martin's School, St Martin's
- St Mary's Bluecoat CE Primary School, Bridgnorth
- St Mary's CE Primary School, Albrighton
- St Mary's CE Primary School, Bucknell
- St Mary's CE Primary School, Shawbury
- St Thomas and St Anne CE Primary School, Cruckmeole
- Selattyn CE Primary School, Selattyn
- Sheriffhales Primary School, Sheriffhales
- Shifnal Primary School, Shifnal
- Shrewsbury Cathedral RC Primary School, Shrewsbury
- Stiperstones CE Primary School, Snailbeach
- Stoke-on-Tern Primary School, Stoke Heath
- Stokesay Primary School, Craven Arms
- Stottesdon CE Primary School, Stottesdon
- Sundore Infant School, Shrewsbury
- Tilstock CE Primary School, Tilstock
- Trefonen CE Primary School, Trefonen
- Trinity CE Primary School, Ford
- Welshampton CE Primary School, Welshampton
- West Felton CE Primary School, West Felton
- Weston Lullingfields CE School, Weston Lullingfields
- Weston Rhyn Primary School, Weston Rhyn
- Whitchurch CE Infant Academy, Whitchurch
- Whitchurch CE Junior Academy, Whitchurch
- Whittington CE Primary School, Whittington
- Whixall CE Primary School, Whixall
- The Wilfred Owen School, Shrewsbury
- Wistanstow CE Primary School, Wistanstow
- Woodfield Infant School, Shrewsbury
- Woodside Primary School, Oswestry
- Woore Primary School, Woore
- Worfield Endowed CE Primary School, Worfield

=== Secondary schools ===
- Belvidere School, Shrewsbury
- Bishop's Castle Community College, Bishop's Castle
- Bridgnorth Endowed School, Bridgnorth
- Church Stretton School, Church Stretton
- The Corbet School, Baschurch
- The Grove School, Market Drayton
- Idsall School, Shifnal
- Lacon Childe School, Cleobury Mortimer
- Lakelands Academy, Ellesmere
- Ludlow Church of England School, Ludlow
- The Marches School, Oswestry
- Mary Webb School and Science College, Pontesbury
- Meole Brace School, Meole Brace
- Oldbury Wells School, Oldbury
- The Priory School, Shrewsbury
- St Martin's School, St Martin's
- Shrewsbury Academy, Shrewsbury
- Sir John Talbot's School, Whitchurch
- Thomas Adams School, Wem
- William Brookes School, Much Wenlock

=== Special and alternative schools ===
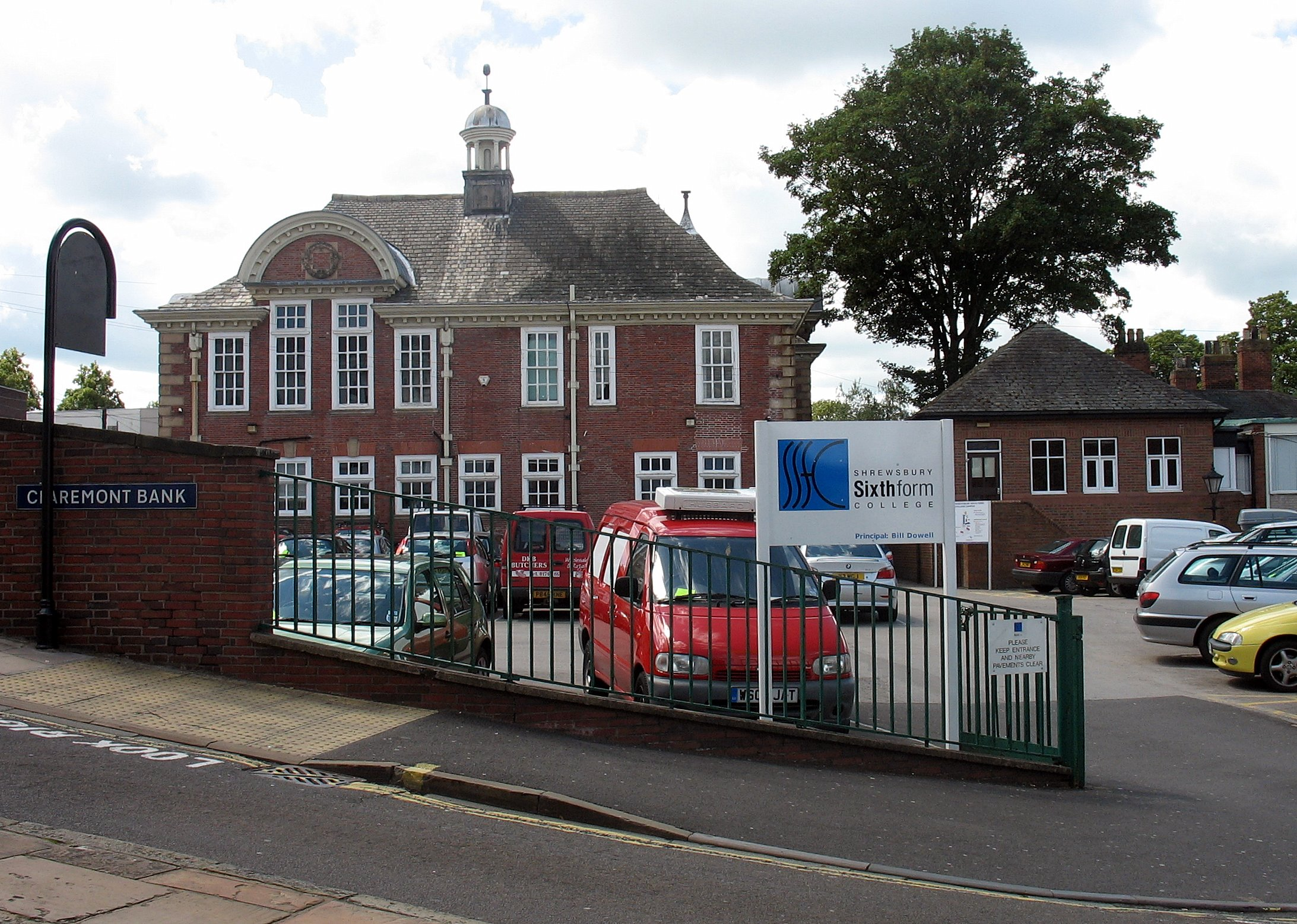
The Shrewsbury Sixth Form College Grade II listed main building, built in 1910, as viewed from Claremont Bank.

- The Keystone Academy, Shrewsbury
- Severndale Specialist Academy, Shrewsbury
- Tuition, Medical and Behaviour Support Service, Shrewsbury
- Woodlands School, Wem

=== Further education ===
- Derwen College
- Shrewsbury College
- Shrewsbury Sixth Form College
- Ludlow College
- Walford and North Shropshire College

== Independent schools ==
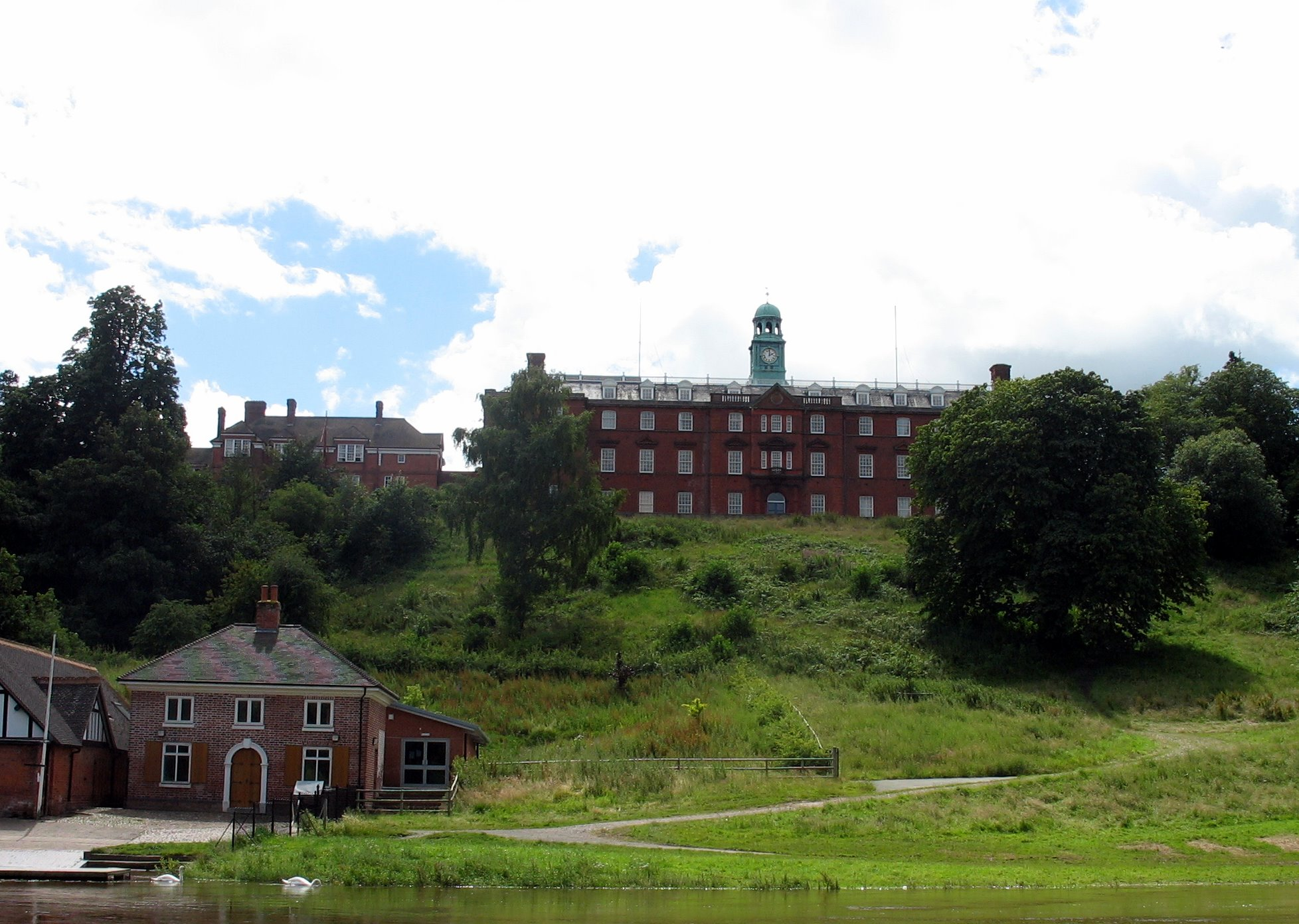
Shrewsbury School viewed from The Quarry, with the school's boathouse in the foreground.

=== Primary and preparatory schools ===
- Moor Park School, Richard's Castle
- Packwood Haugh School, Ruyton XI Towns
- The Prepatoria School, Shrewsbury
- Prestfelde School, Shrewsbury
- St Winefride's Convent School, Shrewsbury

=== Senior and all-through schools ===
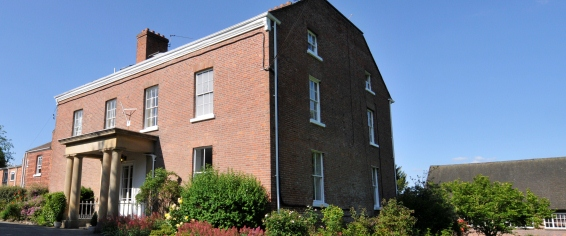
School House of Oswestry School built in the Georgian period style with Doric columns.

- Adcote School, Little Ness
- Bedstone College, Bedstone
- Birchfield School, Albrighton
- Concord College, Acton Burnell
- Ellesmere College, Ellesmere
- Moreton Hall School, Weston Rhyn
- Oswestry School, Oswestry
- Shrewsbury High School, Shrewsbury
- Shrewsbury School, Shrewsbury

=== Special and alternative schools ===
- Access School, Harmer Hill
- Acorn Wood, Coton
- Amberleigh Therapeutic School, Redhill
- Bettws Lifehouse Independent Special School, Shrewsbury
- Bridge School, Chelmarsh
- Darwin School, Minsterley
- The Fitzroy Academy, Cruckton
- The Gables Learning Centre, Albrighton
- Harlescott House School, Shrewsbury
- The Henslow and Evolution School, Bicton
- Hillcrest Shifnal School, Shifnal
- The Mews, Wem
- Oakwood School, Bicton
- Options Higford, Higford
- Overton School, Ludlow
- Physis Heathgates Academy, Prees
- Smallbrook School, Sleap
- Westbury School, Westbury
