= Gtech =

Gtech or G-Tech may refer to:

- GTECH S.p.A., now International Game Technology, formerly Lottomatica S.p.A.
- GTECH Corporation, an American company that was acquired by Lottomatica in 2006
- Grey Technology (Gtech), a British company Grey Technology Ltd (Gtech) for cordless home and garden appliances
- Guilford Technical Community College
- G-Technology, a brand of Western Digital, now called SanDisk Professional

== See also ==
- Gtech Community Stadium
