= 2023–24 Premier League =

Football season in England

Premier League
- Season: 2023–24
- Dates: 11 August 2023 – 19 May 2024
- Champions: Manchester City; 8th Premier League title 10th English title
- Relegated: Luton Town; Burnley; Sheffield United
- Champions League: Manchester City; Arsenal; Liverpool; Aston Villa
- Europa League: Manchester United (as FA Cup winners); Tottenham Hotspur
- Conference League: Chelsea
- Matches: 380
- Goals: 1,246 (3.28 per match)
- Best player: Phil Foden
- Top goalscorer: Erling Haaland (27 goals)
- Best goalkeeper: David Raya (16 clean sheets)
- Biggest home win: Chelsea 6–0 Everton (15 April 2024)
- Biggest away win: Sheffield United 0–8 Newcastle United (24 September 2023)
- Highest scoring: Sheffield United 0–8 Newcastle United (24 September 2023); Chelsea 4–4 Manchester City (12 November 2023); Newcastle United 4–4 Luton Town (3 February 2024)
- Longest winning run: 9 matches Manchester City
- Longest unbeaten run: 23 matches Manchester City
- Longest winless run: 14 matches Sheffield United
- Longest losing run: 7 matches Sheffield United
- Highest attendance: 73,612; Manchester United 3–0 West Ham United (4 February 2024)
- Lowest attendance: 10,421; Bournemouth 0–0 Chelsea (17 September 2023)
- Total attendance: 14,674,624
- Average attendance: 38,617

The 2023–24 Premier League was the 32nd season of the Premier League and the 125th season of top-flight English football overall. The season began on 11 August 2023 and concluded on 19 May 2024.

Manchester City, the defending champions, won their fourth consecutive title, the first team to do so in English men's football.

This season was significant as it was affected by points deductions handed out to both Everton and Nottingham Forest, as part of the Premier League’s crackdown on financial breaches by clubs. Everton received two separate points deductions (a 10-point deduction, later reduced to six, in November 2023 and a further two-point deduction in April 2024) whilst Forest received a four-point deduction in March 2024. Each deduction was for breaking the league’s Profit and Sustainability Rules (PSR).

This season was the third to feature a winter break, with each team having a two-week break from all competitions some time between 2 January and 30 January 2024. Longer intervals were added between matches for the holiday period between Christmas and New Year's Day, with no club playing within 60 hours of another match. The summer transfer window was from 14 June to 1 September 2023, while the winter transfer window was between 1 January and 1 February 2024.

A record 1,246 goals (380 games, an average of 3.28 per match) were scored during the season, breaking the previous record of 1,222 in the 1992–93 season (which had 462 games, an average of 2.65 per match). The average goals per game was the highest in the top flight since 1964–65. All three of the newly promoted teams were relegated (Luton Town, Burnley and Sheffield United), the first time this happened since the 1997–98 season; those three teams had a combined total of 66 points. Nottingham Forest avoided relegation with 32 points (including a 4-point deduction), a record low for a team to do so.

== Summary ==
For only the third time in Premier League history (after Middlesbrough in 1996–97 and Portsmouth in 2009–10), a Premier League team was deducted points; on 17 November 2023, Everton had 10 points deducted from their total for a breach of the Premier League's profit and sustainability rules (PSR). The deduction was the biggest to be handed out in Premier League history and was subject to appeal. On 26 February 2024, following their appeal, it was announced that the deduction had been reduced to six points. On 18 March 2024, Nottingham Forest became the fourth-ever Premier League club to receive a points deduction, as they were deducted four points for a breach of the Premier League's profitability and sustainability rules. The club submitted an appeal on 26 March, but on 7 May their appeal was rejected. On 8 April, Everton were deducted two additional points for further PSR breaches, which the club initially appealed, but later withdrew. In total, the club were deducted eight points this season.

On 30 September 2023, in the game between Tottenham Hotspur and Liverpool, Premier League's video assistant referee (VAR), Darren England, failed to intervene on a decision that disallowed Luis Díaz's legitimate goal. Liverpool lost the game 2–1 and PGMOL admitted the offside ruling as a "significant human error". It was revealed that England and the assistant VAR, Dan Cook, took an eight-hour long flight back from the United Arab Emirates a day before. A group of PGMOL officials were in the UAE to take charge of a match between Sharjah and Al-Ain. It led to questions over PGMOL's decision of allowing the leading match officials to take lucrative assignments in the UAE Pro League.

On 5 December 2023, Sheffield United became the first club to sack their manager, dismissing Paul Heckingbottom after their 5–0 defeat to fellow newly-promoted side Burnley. He was replaced by Chris Wilder, marking his return to the club since the 2020–21 season. At that time, Sheffield United were bottom of the league, having amassed only five points in 14 games.

On 16 December 2023, the match between Bournemouth and Luton Town was abandoned after 65 minutes with the score level at 1–1 as Luton captain Tom Lockyer suffered a cardiac arrest and collapsed on the pitch. Play was initially suspended, with the referee taking both sets of players off, midway through the second half, whilst medical personnel tended to Lockyer. He was eventually stretchered off and taken to hospital, where it was later announced that he was responsive, and in a stable condition. The game was replayed on 13 March 2024, with Luton taking a 3–0 lead at half-time, before Bournemouth fought back in the second half to win 4–3, in what was praised as one of the greatest comebacks in the history of the league.

On 19 December 2023, Nottingham Forest became the second club to sack their manager, dismissing Steve Cooper after Forest had won one game from 13 league games played. His last game in charge was a 2–0 home defeat to Tottenham Hotspur. He was replaced by former Wolverhampton Wanderers and Spurs coach Nuno Espírito Santo, whose first game in charge was a 3–2 home loss to Bournemouth, extending the club’s winless run to seven games. In his second game, Nuno ended Nottingham Forest's winless run with a 3–1 away win at Newcastle United, with Chris Wood scoring a hat-trick against his old club, having left in the January transfer window of the 2022–23 season.

On 26 January 2024, Liverpool manager Jürgen Klopp announced his intention to step down as manager at the end of the season after more than eight years in charge.

On 19 February 2024, Crystal Palace manager Roy Hodgson resigned from his role. Palace had lost ten of their previous 16 games and were 16th in the table, five points above the relegation zone. Hodgson, who had been taken ill at a team training session on 15 February, was replaced by former Eintracht Frankfurt manager Oliver Glasner.

On 27 April 2024, Sheffield United became the first team relegated to the Championship after a 5–1 away defeat at Newcastle United. The defeat left the Blades 10 points adrift of safety with three matches left to play. On 4 May, they also became the first Premier League side to concede 100 goals in a 38 game season, equalling the record of Swindon Town overall, who also conceded 100 goals in the 1993–94 season, consisting of 42 games. On 11 May, they broke the Premier League record, conceding a 101st goal in a 1–0 defeat to Everton, and by the end of the season had conceded a total of 104 goals, the most by a top flight team since Ipswich Town conceded 121 in the 1963–64 First Division.

On 6 May 2024, West Ham United announced that manager David Moyes would leave the club at the end of the season when his contract expired.

On 11 May 2024, Burnley became the second team to be relegated, following a 2–1 away defeat to Tottenham Hotspur. The defeat left them five points adrift of safety with one match left to play, having failed to move out of the relegation zone since the opening day of the season. On the same day, Luton Town lost 3–1 away to West Ham United, which left them three points adrift of safety with one match left to play, a result which whilst not mathematically confirming relegation, would have required a 13 goal swing on the last day of the season to beat 17th placed Nottingham Forest. Their relegation was confirmed on the final day as they lost 4–2 to Fulham, and Nottingham Forest beat Burnley 2–1.

On 18 May 2024, Brighton & Hove Albion announced that they had reached a mutual agreement with manager Roberto De Zerbi to terminate his contract following the conclusion of the season the following day.

On 19 May 2024, the final day of the season, Manchester City beat West Ham United 3–1 at home to secure the title with 91 points – two points ahead of their title rivals Arsenal, who defeated Everton 2–1 at home. Arsenal finished runners-up with 89 points, becoming the third-best second-placed team in the history of the Premier League.

This season saw the continued rise of Aston Villa under Unai Emery, with them securing a Champions League spot under the new 'league phase' format, and for the first time since 1983. Meanwhile, Manchester United suffered their worst season in Premier League history. After finishing third and winning the EFL Cup in Erik ten Hag's debut season, United recorded new lows in his second season, including their lowest finish in a season (eighth, previously seventh in 2013–14 under David Moyes), the most losses in a single Premier League season ever (14), a −1 goal difference and a total of 58 goals conceded (82 in all competitions), the most since the 1976–77 season. In spite of this, United salvaged their season by defeating Manchester City in the FA Cup final, denying them a league and cup double in successive seasons and securing a place in the Europa League league phase for the next season.

Chelsea, who finished 12th in the previous season, saw themselves back into European football after a year's absence under former Tottenham Hotspur manager Mauricio Pochettino, by finishing sixth after a season full of inconsistent results, confirming qualification for the Conference League playoff round for the next season on the final matchday. Meanwhile, Newcastle United finished seventh, above Manchester United on goal difference for the first time since the 1976–77 season. However, Manchester United's FA Cup win meant that they missed out on European football; had Manchester City won the FA Cup, Chelsea would have taken United's spot in the Europa League league phase, Newcastle would have qualified for the Conference League playoff round, and Manchester United would have missed out on European football altogether.

=== Developments ===
The new stoppage time rule was used in the league for the first time this season. In an effort to improve clamping down on time-wasting and to improve the accuracy of time added on, stoppage times were longer across matches. The new rule accounted for stoppages due to injuries, goal celebrations, yellow and red cards, and VAR reviews. Additionally, there were yellow/red card offences for dissent and time wasting, which contributed to a large increase in yellow and red cards this season. It was reported that the new rule also made the matches more chaotic and unpredictable, and increased the drama and spectacle of the competition with many goals scored in added time (many occurring after the 95th minute). In addition, increasing the stoppage time was considered a good move by some who argued that time wasting was no longer tolerable, while others (including some insiders) would have preferred a switch to actual time and more clarity and transparency about how long a match should last.

== Teams ==
Twenty teams competed in the league – the top seventeen teams from the previous season and the three teams promoted from the Championship. The promoted teams were Burnley, Sheffield United and Luton Town, who returned to the top flight after respective absences of one, two and thirty-one years. This was also Luton Town's first season in the Premier League. With their promotion, Luton Town were the first team to have been promoted from non-League (5th tier or lower within the English football league pyramid) to the top flight during the Premier League era. They replaced Leicester City, Leeds United and Southampton, who were relegated to the Championship after respective spells of nine, three and eleven years in the top flight.

=== Stadiums and locations ===
Locations of the 2023–24 Premier League teams
Greater London Premier League football clubs

Note: Table lists in alphabetical order.

Team	Location	Stadium	Capacity
Arsenal	London (Holloway)	Emirates Stadium	60,704
Aston Villa	Birmingham	Villa Park	42,657
Bournemouth	Bournemouth	Dean Court	11,307
Brentford	London (Brentford)	Brentford Community Stadium	17,250
Brighton & Hove Albion	Falmer	Falmer Stadium	31,876
Burnley	Burnley	Turf Moor	21,944
Chelsea	London (Fulham)	Stamford Bridge	40,173
Crystal Palace	London (Selhurst)	Selhurst Park	25,486
Everton	Liverpool (Walton)	Goodison Park	39,414
Fulham	London (Fulham)	Craven Cottage	24,500
Liverpool	Liverpool (Anfield)	Anfield	61,276
Luton Town	Luton	Kenilworth Road	12,000
Manchester City	Manchester (Bradford)	City of Manchester Stadium	53,400
Manchester United	Manchester (Old Trafford)	Old Trafford	74,031
Newcastle United	Newcastle upon Tyne	St James' Park	52,257
Nottingham Forest	West Bridgford	City Ground	30,404
Sheffield United	Sheffield	Bramall Lane	32,050
Tottenham Hotspur	London (Tottenham)	Tottenham Hotspur Stadium	62,850
West Ham United	London (Stratford)	London Stadium	62,500
Wolverhampton Wanderers	Wolverhampton	Molineux Stadium	31,750

=== Personnel and kits ===
Team	Manager	Captain	Kit manufacturer	Shirt sponsor (chest)	Shirt sponsor (sleeve)
Arsenal	(Spain) Mikel Arteta	(Norway) Martin Ødegaard	Adidas	Emirates	Visit Rwanda
Aston Villa	(Spain) Unai Emery	(Scotland) John McGinn	Castore	BK8	Trade Nation
Bournemouth	(Spain) Andoni Iraola	(Brazil) Neto	Umbro	Dafabet	DeWalt
Brentford	(Denmark) Thomas Frank	(Denmark) Christian Nørgaard	Umbro	Hollywoodbets	PensionBee
Brighton & Hove Albion	(Italy) Roberto De Zerbi	(England) Lewis Dunk	Nike	American Express	Snickers UK
Burnley	(Belgium) Vincent Kompany	(England) Jack Cork	Umbro	W88	Uphold
Chelsea	(Argentina) Mauricio Pochettino	(England) Reece James	Nike	Infinite Athlete	BingX
Crystal Palace	(Austria) Oliver Glasner	(England) Joel Ward	Macron	Cinch	Kaiyun Sports
Everton	(England) Sean Dyche	(Republic of Ireland) Séamus Coleman	Hummel	Stake.com	KICK
Fulham	(Portugal) Marco Silva	(Scotland) Tom Cairney	Adidas	SBOTOP	WebBeds
Liverpool	(Germany) Jürgen Klopp	(Netherlands) Virgil van Dijk	Nike	Standard Chartered	Expedia
Luton Town	(Wales) Rob Edwards	(Wales) Tom Lockyer	Umbro	Utilita	Free Now
Manchester City	(Spain) Pep Guardiola	(England) Kyle Walker	Puma	Etihad Airways	OKX
Manchester United	(Netherlands) Erik ten Hag	(Portugal) Bruno Fernandes	Adidas	TeamViewer	DXC Technology
Newcastle United	(England) Eddie Howe	(England) Jamaal Lascelles	Castore	Sela	Noon
Nottingham Forest	(Portugal) Nuno Espírito Santo	(England) Ryan Yates	Adidas	Kaiyun Sports	Ideagen
Sheffield United	(England) Chris Wilder	(Republic of Ireland) John Egan	Erreà	CFI Financial Group	Gtech
Tottenham Hotspur	(Australia) Ange Postecoglou	(South Korea) Son Heung-min	Nike	AIA	Cinch
West Ham United	(Scotland) David Moyes	(France) Kurt Zouma	Umbro	Betway	JD Sports
Wolverhampton Wanderers	(England) Gary O'Neil	(England) Max Kilman	Castore	AstroPay	6686 Sports

=== Managerial changes ===
Team	Outgoing manager	Manner of departure	Date of vacancy	Position in the table	Incoming manager	Date of appointment
Chelsea	(England) Frank Lampard	End of interim spell	28 May 2023	Pre-season	(Argentina) Mauricio Pochettino	29 May 2023
Tottenham Hotspur	(England) Ryan Mason	End of interim spell	28 May 2023	Pre-season	(Australia) Ange Postecoglou	6 June 2023
Bournemouth	(England) Gary O'Neil	Sacked	19 June 2023	Pre-season	(Spain) Andoni Iraola	19 June 2023
Wolverhampton Wanderers	(Spain) Julen Lopetegui	Mutual consent	8 August 2023	Pre-season	(England) Gary O'Neil	9 August 2023
Sheffield United	(England) Paul Heckingbottom	Sacked	5 December 2023	20th	(England) Chris Wilder	5 December 2023
Nottingham Forest	(Wales) Steve Cooper	Sacked	19 December 2023	17th	(Portugal) Nuno Espírito Santo	20 December 2023
Crystal Palace	(England) Roy Hodgson	Resigned	19 February 2024	16th	(Austria) Oliver Glasner	19 February 2024

== League table ==
Pos	Team	Pld	W	D	L	GF	GA	GD	Pts	Qualification or relegation
1	Manchester City (C)	38	28	7	3	96	34	+62	91	Qualification for the Champions League league phase
2	Arsenal	38	28	5	5	91	29	+62	89	Qualification for the Champions League league phase
3	Liverpool	38	24	10	4	86	41	+45	82	Qualification for the Champions League league phase
4	Aston Villa	38	20	8	10	76	61	+15	68	Qualification for the Champions League league phase
5	Tottenham Hotspur	38	20	6	12	74	61	+13	66	Qualification for the Europa League league phase
6	Chelsea	38	18	9	11	77	63	+14	63	Qualification for the Conference League play-off round (Note: Since the winners of the 2023–24 EFL Cup, Liverpool, qualified for the Champions League, the spot given to the League Cup winners (Conference League play-off round) was passed to the sixth-placed team.)
7	Newcastle United	38	18	6	14	85	62	+23	60	
8	Manchester United	38	18	6	14	57	58	−1	60	Qualification for the Europa League league phase (Note: Manchester United qualified for the Europa League league phase as the 2023–24 FA Cup winners.)
9	West Ham United	38	14	10	14	60	74	−14	52	
10	Crystal Palace	38	13	10	15	57	58	−1	49	
11	Brighton & Hove Albion	38	12	12	14	55	62	−7	48	
12	Bournemouth	38	13	9	16	54	67	−13	48	
13	Fulham	38	13	8	17	55	61	−6	47	
14	Wolverhampton Wanderers	38	13	7	18	50	65	−15	46	
15	Everton	38	13	9	16	40	51	−11	40 (Note: Everton were deducted eight points for breaching profitability and sustainability rules. They were originally deducted ten points but this was reduced to six after an appeal. The club were then deducted an additional two points for further PSR breaches.)	
16	Brentford	38	10	9	19	56	65	−9	39	
17	Nottingham Forest	38	9	9	20	49	67	−18	32 (Note: Nottingham Forest were deducted four points for breaching profitability and sustainability rules. The club appealed the decision but were unsuccessful.)	
18	Luton Town (R)	38	6	8	24	52	85	−33	26	Relegation to EFL Championship
19	Burnley (R)	38	5	9	24	41	78	−37	24	Relegation to EFL Championship
20	Sheffield United (R)	38	3	7	28	35	104	−69	16	Relegation to EFL Championship

Source: Premier League
Rules for classification: 1) Points; 2) Goal difference; 3) Goals scored; 4) If the champions, relegated teams or qualified teams for UEFA competitions cannot be determined by rules 1 to 3, rules 4.1 to 4.3 are applied – 4.1) Points gained in head-to-head record between such teams; 4.2) Away goals scored in head-to-head record between such teams; 4.3) Play-offs
(C) Champions; (R) Relegated

== Results ==
Home \ Away	ARS	AVL	BOU	BRE	BHA	BUR	CHE	CRY	EVE	FUL	LIV	LUT	MCI	MUN	NEW	NFO	SHU	TOT	WHU	WOL
Arsenal	—	0–2	3–0	2–1	2–0	3–1	5–0	5–0	2–1	2–2	3–1	2–0	1–0	3–1	4–1	2–1	5–0	2–2	0–2	2–1
Aston Villa	1–0	—	3–1	3–3	6–1	3–2	2–2	3–1	4–0	3–1	3–3	3–1	1–0	1–2	1–3	4–2	1–1	0–4	4–1	2–0
Bournemouth	0–4	2–2	—	1–2	3–0	2–1	0–0	1–0	2–1	3–0	0–4	4–3	0–1	2–2	2–0	1–1	2–2	0–2	1–1	1–2
Brentford	0–1	1–2	2–2	—	0–0	3–0	2–2	1–1	1–3	0–0	1–4	3–1	1–3	1–1	2–4	3–2	2–0	2–2	3–2	1–4
Brighton & Hove Albion	0–3	1–0	3–1	2–1	—	1–1	1–2	4–1	1–1	1–1	2–2	4–1	0–4	0–2	3–1	1–0	1–1	4–2	1–3	0–0
Burnley	0–5	1–3	0–2	2–1	1–1	—	1–4	0–2	0–2	2–2	0–2	1–1	0–3	0–1	1–4	1–2	5–0	2–5	1–2	1–1
Chelsea	2–2	0–1	2–1	0–2	3–2	2–2	—	2–1	6–0	1–0	1–1	3–0	4–4	4–3	3–2	0–1	2–0	2–0	5–0	2–4
Crystal Palace	0–1	5–0	0–2	3–1	1–1	3–0	1–3	—	2–3	0–0	1–2	1–1	2–4	4–0	2–0	0–0	3–2	1–2	5–2	3–2
Everton	0–1	0–0	3–0	1–0	1–1	1–0	2–0	1–1	—	0–1	2–0	1–2	1–3	0–3	3–0	2–0	1–0	2–2	1–3	0–1
Fulham	2–1	1–2	3–1	0–3	3–0	0–2	0–2	1–1	0–0	—	1–3	1–0	0–4	0–1	0–1	5–0	3–1	3–0	5–0	3–2
Liverpool	1–1	3–0	3–1	3–0	2–1	3–1	4–1	0–1	2–0	4–3	—	4–1	1–1	0–0	4–2	3–0	3–1	4–2	3–1	2–0
Luton Town	3–4	2–3	2–1	1–5	4–0	1–2	2–3	2–1	1–1	2–4	1–1	—	1–2	1–2	1–0	1–1	1–3	0–1	1–2	1–1
Manchester City	0–0	4–1	6–1	1–0	2–1	3–1	1–1	2–2	2–0	5–1	1–1	5–1	—	3–1	1–0	2–0	2–0	3–3	3–1	5–1
Manchester United	0–1	3–2	0–3	2–1	1–3	1–1	2–1	0–1	2–0	1–2	2–2	1–0	0–3	—	3–2	3–2	4–2	2–2	3–0	1–0
Newcastle United	1–0	5–1	2–2	1–0	1–1	2–0	4–1	4–0	1–1	3–0	1–2	4–4	2–3	1–0	—	1–3	5–1	4–0	4–3	3–0
Nottingham Forest	1–2	2–0	2–3	1–1	2–3	1–1	2–3	1–1	0–1	3–1	0–1	2–2	0–2	2–1	2–3	—	2–1	0–2	2–0	2–2
Sheffield United	0–6	0–5	1–3	1–0	0–5	1–4	2–2	0–1	2–2	3–3	0–2	2–3	1–2	1–2	0–8	1–3	—	0–3	2–2	2–1
Tottenham Hotspur	2–3	1–2	3–1	3–2	2–1	2–1	1–4	3–1	2–1	2–0	2–1	2–1	0–2	2–0	4–1	3–1	2–1	—	1–2	1–2
West Ham United	0–6	1–1	1–1	4–2	0–0	2–2	3–1	1–1	0–1	0–2	2–2	3–1	1–3	2–0	2–2	3–2	2–0	1–1	—	3–0
Wolverhampton Wanderers	0–2	1–1	0–1	0–2	1–4	1–0	2–1	1–3	3–0	2–1	1–3	2–1	2–1	3–4	2–2	1–1	1–0	2–1	1–2	—

Source: Premier League
Legend: Blue = home team win; Yellow = draw; Red = away team win.
For upcoming matches, an "a" indicates there is an article about the rivalry between the two participants.

== Season statistics ==
=== Top scorers ===
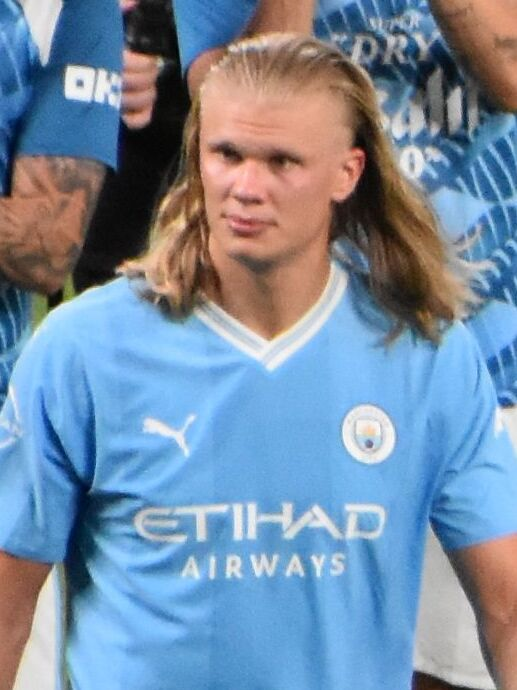
Erling Haaland won his second successive Premier League Golden Boot after scoring 27 goals for Manchester City.

Rank	Player	Club	Goals
1	(Norway) Erling Haaland	Manchester City	27
2	(England) Cole Palmer	Chelsea	22
3	(Sweden) Alexander Isak	Newcastle United	21
4	(England) Phil Foden	Manchester City	19
4	(England) Dominic Solanke	Bournemouth	19
4	(England) Ollie Watkins	Aston Villa	19
7	(Egypt) Mohamed Salah	Liverpool	18
8	(South Korea) Son Heung-min	Tottenham Hotspur	17
9	(England) Jarrod Bowen	West Ham United	16
9	(France) Jean-Philippe Mateta	Crystal Palace	16
9	(England) Bukayo Saka	Arsenal	16

==== Hat-tricks ====
Player	For	Against	Result	Date
(South Korea) Son Heung-min	Tottenham Hotspur	Burnley	5–2 (A)	2 September 2023
(Norway) Erling Haaland	Manchester City	Fulham	5–1 (H)	2 September 2023
(Republic of Ireland) Evan Ferguson	Brighton & Hove Albion	Newcastle United	3–1 (H)	2 September 2023
(England) Ollie Watkins	Aston Villa	Brighton & Hove Albion	6–1 (H)	30 September 2023
(England) Eddie Nketiah	Arsenal	Sheffield United	5–0 (H)	28 October 2023
(Senegal) Nicolas Jackson	Chelsea	Tottenham Hotspur	4–1 (A)	6 November 2023
(England) Dominic Solanke	Bournemouth	Nottingham Forest	3–2 (A)	23 December 2023
(New Zealand) Chris Wood	Nottingham Forest	Newcastle United	3–1 (A)	26 December 2023
(England) Elijah Adebayo	Luton Town	Brighton & Hove Albion	4–0 (H)	30 January 2024
(Brazil) Matheus Cunha	Wolverhampton Wanderers	Chelsea	4–2 (A)	4 February 2024
(England) Phil Foden	Manchester City	Brentford	3–1 (A)	5 February 2024
(England) Jarrod Bowen	West Ham United	Brentford	4–2 (H)	26 February 2024
(England) Phil Foden	Manchester City	Aston Villa	4–1 (H)	3 April 2024
(England) Cole Palmer	Chelsea	Manchester United	4–3 (H)	4 April 2024
(England) Cole Palmer^{4}	Chelsea	Everton	6–0 (H)	15 April 2024
(Norway) Erling Haaland^{4}	Manchester City	Wolverhampton Wanderers	5–1 (H)	4 May 2024
(France) Jean-Philippe Mateta	Crystal Palace	Aston Villa	5–0 (H)	19 May 2024

Note: ^{4} – player scored 4 goals

=== Clean sheets ===
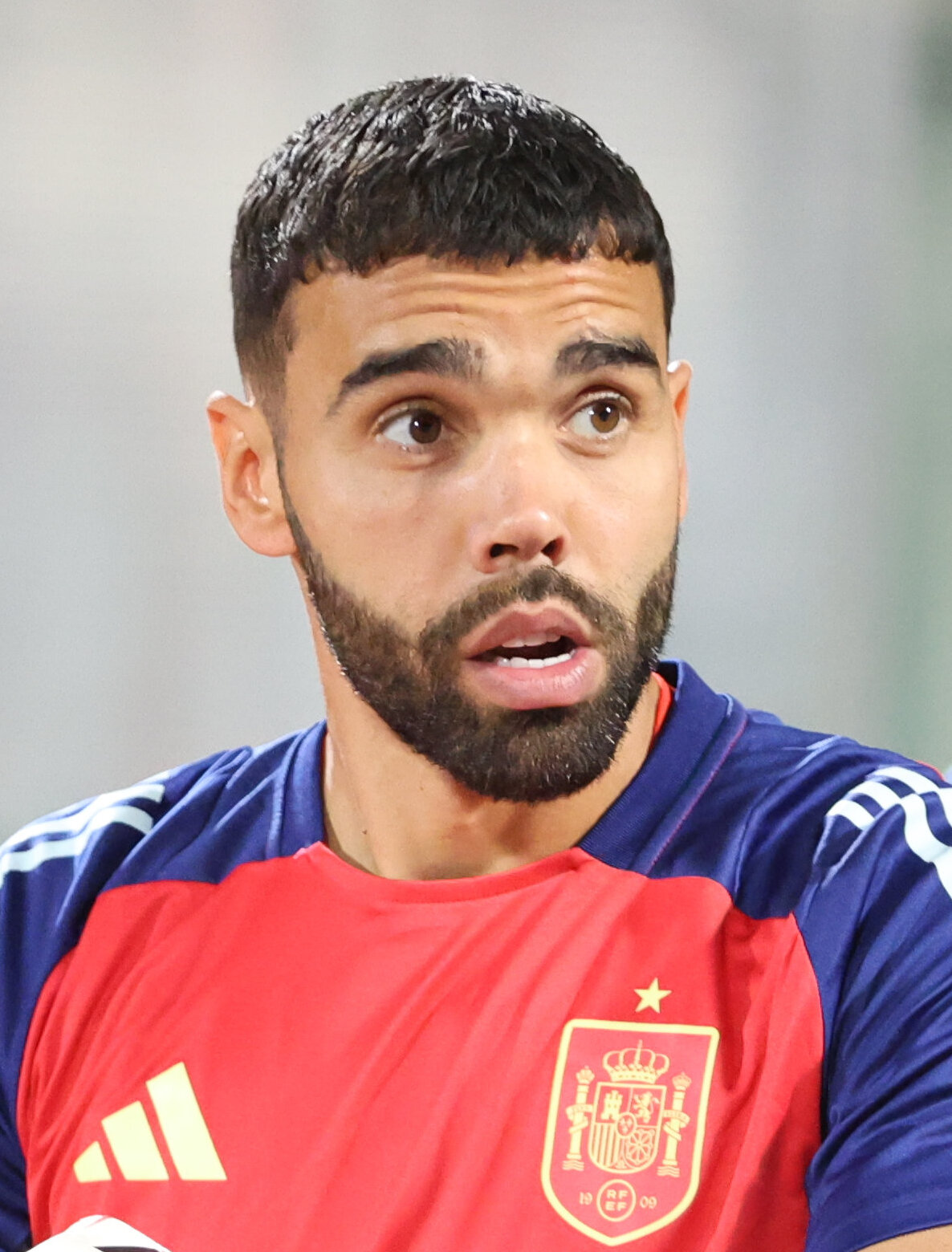
David Raya won his first Premier League Golden Glove after keeping 16 clean sheets for Arsenal.

Rank	Player	Club	Clean sheets
1	(Spain) David Raya	Arsenal	16
2	(England) Jordan Pickford	Everton	13
3	(Germany) Bernd Leno	Fulham	10
3	(Brazil) Ederson	Manchester City	10
5	(Cameroon) André Onana	Manchester United	9
6	(Brazil) Alisson	Liverpool	8
6	(Argentina) Emiliano Martínez	Aston Villa	8
8	(Netherlands) Mark Flekken	Brentford	7
8	(Brazil) Neto	Bournemouth	7
8	(Italy) Guglielmo Vicario	Tottenham Hotspur	7

=== Discipline ===
==== Player ====
- Most yellow cards: 13
  - (Portugal) João Palhinha (Fulham)
  - (Argentina) Marcos Senesi (Bournemouth)
- Most red cards: 2
  - (Mali) Yves Bissouma (Tottenham Hotspur)
  - (England) Reece James (Chelsea)
  - (Scotland) Oli McBurnie (Sheffield United)

==== Club ====
- Most yellow cards: 105
  - Chelsea
- Fewest yellow cards: 52
  - Manchester City
- Most red cards: 7
  - Burnley
- Fewest red cards: 0
  - Luton Town

== Awards ==
=== Monthly awards ===
Month	Manager of the Month		Player of the Month		Goal of the Month		Save of the Month		References
Month	Manager	Club	Player	Club	Player	Club	Player	Club	References
August	(Australia) Ange Postecoglou	Tottenham Hotspur	(England) James Maddison	Tottenham Hotspur	(Japan) Kaoru Mitoma	Brighton & Hove Albion	(Brazil) Alisson	Liverpool	
September	(Australia) Ange Postecoglou	Tottenham Hotspur	(South Korea) Son Heung-min	Tottenham Hotspur	(Portugal) Bruno Fernandes	Manchester United	(Spain) Robert Sánchez	Chelsea	
October	(Australia) Ange Postecoglou	Tottenham Hotspur	(Egypt) Mohamed Salah	Liverpool	(Iran) Saman Ghoddos	Brentford	(France) Alphonse Areola	West Ham United	
November	(Netherlands) Erik ten Hag	Manchester United	(England) Harry Maguire	Manchester United	(Argentina) Alejandro Garnacho	Manchester United	(Belgium) Thomas Kaminski	Luton Town	
December	(Spain) Unai Emery	Aston Villa	(England) Dominic Solanke	Bournemouth	(Argentina) Alexis Mac Allister	Liverpool	(England) Wes Foderingham	Sheffield United	
January	(Germany) Jürgen Klopp	Liverpool	(Portugal) Diogo Jota	Liverpool	(Norway) Oscar Bobb	Manchester City	(England) Jordan Pickford	Everton	
February	(Spain) Mikel Arteta	Arsenal	(Denmark) Rasmus Højlund	Manchester United	(England) Kobbie Mainoo	Manchester United	(Netherlands) Mark Flekken	Brentford	
March	(Spain) Andoni Iraola	Bournemouth	(Brazil) Rodrigo Muniz	Fulham	(England) Marcus Rashford	Manchester United	(Belgium) Matz Sels	Nottingham Forest	
April	(England) Sean Dyche	Everton	(England) Cole Palmer	Chelsea	(England) Cole Palmer	Chelsea	(Cameroon) André Onana	Manchester United	

=== Annual awards ===
PFA Team of the Year

Award	Winner	Club
Premier League Manager of the Season	(Spain) Pep Guardiola	Manchester City
Premier League Player of the Season	(England) Phil Foden	Manchester City
Premier League Young Player of the Season	(England) Cole Palmer	Chelsea
Premier League Goal of the Season	(Argentina) Alejandro Garnacho	Manchester United
Premier League Save of the Season	(Belgium) Thomas Kaminski	Luton Town
Premier League Game Changer of the Season	(England) Cole Palmer	Chelsea
Premier League Most Powerful Goal	(France) Moussa Diaby	Aston Villa
PFA Players' Player of the Year	(England) Phil Foden	Manchester City
PFA Young Player of the Year	(England) Cole Palmer	Chelsea
FWA Footballer of the Year	(England) Phil Foden	Manchester City

PFA Team of the Year
Goalkeeper	(Spain) David Raya (Arsenal)			
Defenders	(England) Kyle Walker (Manchester City)	(France) William Saliba (Arsenal)	(Netherlands) Virgil van Dijk (Liverpool)	(Brazil) Gabriel (Arsenal)
Midfielders	(Norway) Martin Ødegaard (Arsenal)		(England) Declan Rice (Arsenal)	(Spain) Rodri (Manchester City)
Forwards	(England) Ollie Watkins (Aston Villa)		(Norway) Erling Haaland (Manchester City)	(England) Phil Foden (Manchester City)

Premier League Fan Team of the Season
Goalkeeper	(Spain) David Raya (Arsenal)			
Defenders	(England) Ben White (Arsenal)	(France) William Saliba (Arsenal)	(Brazil) Gabriel (Arsenal)	(England) Trent Alexander-Arnold (Liverpool)
Midfielders	(England) Cole Palmer (Chelsea)	(Belgium) Kevin De Bruyne (Manchester City)	(Spain) Rodri (Manchester City)	(England) Phil Foden (Manchester City)
Forwards	(England) Ollie Watkins (Aston Villa)		(Norway) Erling Haaland (Manchester City)	

== Attendances ==
Manchester United drew the highest average home attendance in the 2023-24 edition of the Premier League.

#	Football club	Home games	Average attendance
1	Manchester United	19	73,534
2	West Ham United	19	62,464
3	Tottenham Hotspur	19	61,459
4	Arsenal FC	19	60,236
5	Liverpool FC	19	55,989
6	Manchester City	19	53,075
7	Newcastle United	19	52,150
8	Aston Villa	19	41,858
9	Chelsea FC	19	39,576
10	Everton FC	19	39,042
11	Brighton & Hove Albion	19	31,586
12	Wolverhampton Wanderers	19	31,029
13	Sheffield United	19	30,011
14	Nottingham Forest	19	29,386
15	Crystal Palace	19	24,932
16	Fulham FC	19	24,301
17	Burnley FC	19	21,184
18	Brentford FC	19	17,082
19	Luton Town	19	11,244
20	AFC Bournemouth	19	11,103
