= Ifton Meadows =

Nature reserve in Shropshire, England

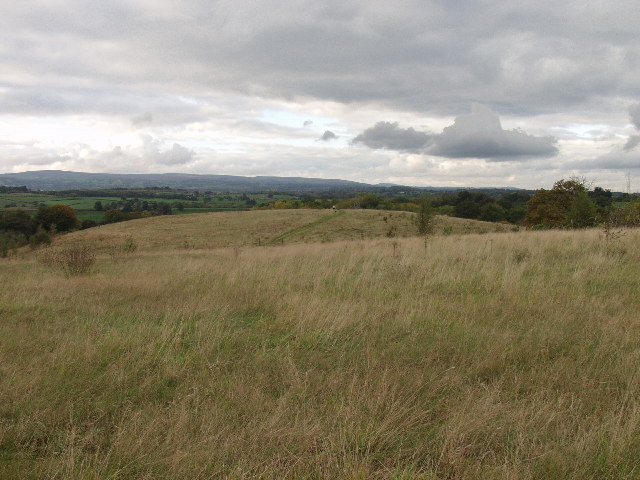

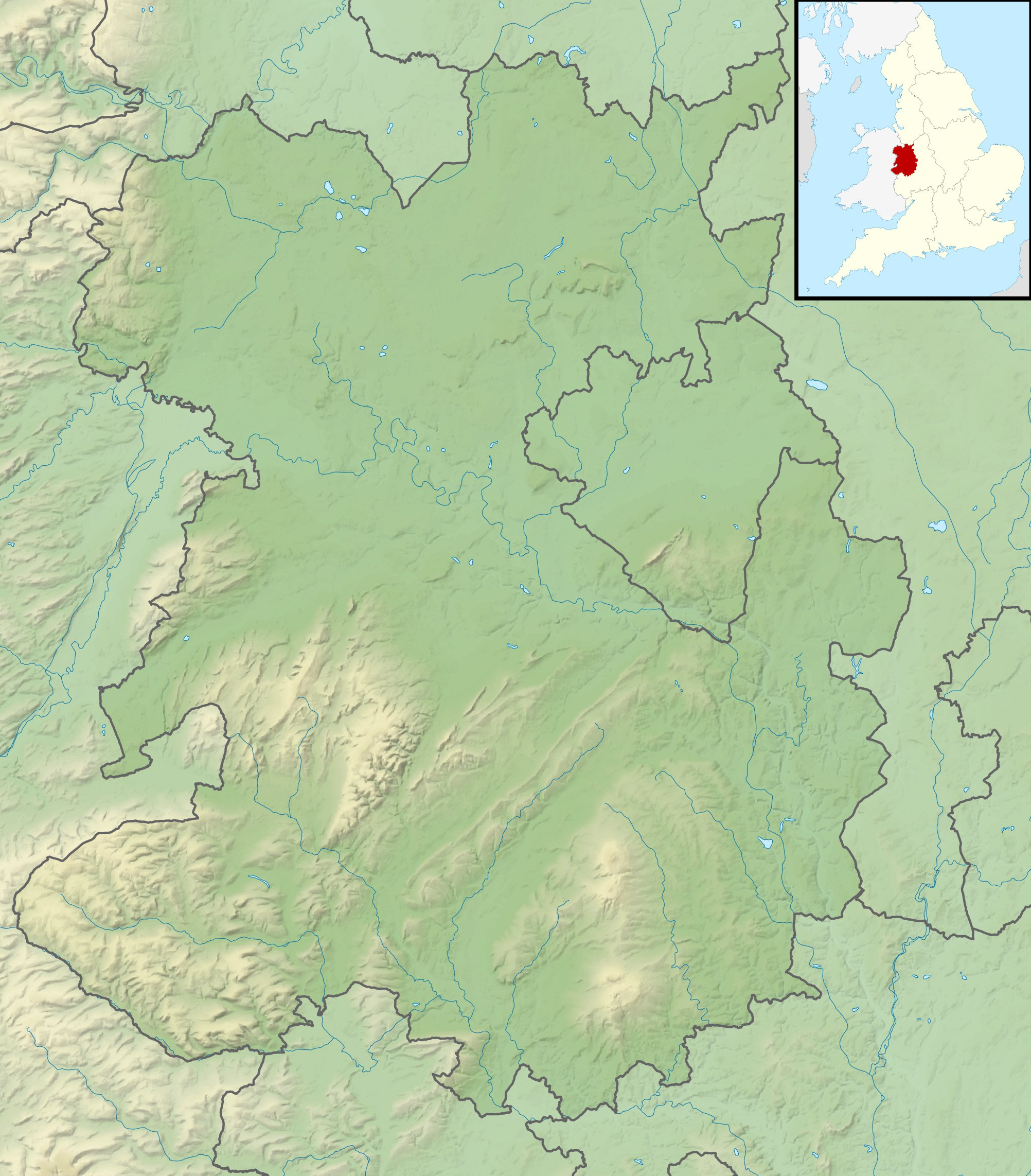
- Location within Shropshire
- Coordinates: 52°55′52″N 3°01′04″W
- Area: 20 hectares (49 acres)
- Established: 2005
- Governing body: Shropshire Council
- Website: www.stmartins-online.org.uk/ifton_meadows_home.html

Ifton Meadows is a Local Nature Reserve north of Oswestry in the county of Shropshire, England.

== Location ==
The reserve is near St Martin's north of Oswestry at SJ319375. Some parking is available, but the Arriva Midlands bus route 53 to St Martins and a short walk of half a mile will also lead to the site.

== Wildlife ==
Ifton Meadows was once a colliery spoil, but over time has become a valuable wildlife habitat. As a result, in 2005 the site was designated as a Local Nature Reserve.

The 20-hectare (49-acre) site includes many different habitats such as woodland, streams, grassland and pools.

The site supports includes woodland wildflowers, birds such as skylarks and woodpeckers, bats, dragonflies, adders and the grizzled skipper butterfly. Because of this wildlife, visitors are told to keep dogs on leads and to stick to the pathway, particularly during the skylark breeding season in April to July.

== History ==
For 400 years this area was mined for coal, but in 1968 the Ifton Colliery closed, and the spoil tips were covered, reopening to the public in 1978.

== Recreational activities ==
Walking routes provided range from an easy pathway suitable for wheelchairs and pushchairs, to steeper pathways through the woodland. For some pathways good footwear is recommended as it can get muddy. For wheelchair users, a radar key is needed to open the entrance gate to gain access. Refreshments and toilets are available locally in St Martins.
