= Listed buildings in St Martin's, Shropshire =

St Martin's is a civil parish in Shropshire, England. It contains 22 listed buildings that are recorded in the National Heritage List for England. Of these, one is listed at Grade I, the highest of the three grades, and the others are at Grade II, the lowest grade. The parish contains the village of St Martin's and smaller settlements, and is otherwise rural. Most of the listed buildings are farmhouses, farm buildings, houses and associated structures. The other listed buildings include a church, a sundial in the churchyard, two bridges, two lodges, a war memorial, and an animal pound.

== Key ==
Grade	Criteria
I	Buildings of exceptional interest, sometimes considered to be internationally important
II	Buildings of national importance and special interest

== Buildings ==
Name and location	Photograph	Date	Notes	Grade
St Martin's Church; 52.91986°N 3.00904°W		13th century	The church was altered and extended through the centuries, it was restored in 1841, and the east wall of the chancel was rebuilt in 1869. The church is built in conglomerate and sandstone, and it has slate roofs. It consists of a nave and a chancel in one cell, a north aisle, a south porch, a northeast vestry and a west tower. The tower has three stages, stepped diagonal buttresses, a west doorway, a clock face on the west side, a moulded cornice with carved heads and a gargoyle, an embattled parapet, and an integral stair turret.	I
Ew'r-Esgob Farmhouse; 52.91883°N 3.03218°W	—	14th or 15th century	The farmhouse was remodelled in the 18th century and later altered and extended. It is timber framed with cruck construction, mainly rebuilt in painted and rendered brick, with a dentilled eaves cornice and a slate roof. There are two storeys, three bays, and a lower former dairy at the left. On the front is a gabled porch, the windows are casements, and in the right gable end are pigeon holes and ledges.	II
Plas Wigginton; 52.91421°N 2.99224°W	—	14th or 15th century (probable)	A farmhouse, later a private house, it was remodelled in the 17th century and later altered and extended. It is timber framed with painted brick infill, largely rendered, and with a slate roof. There are two storeys, and the house consists of a two-bay hall range, a later two-bay gabled cross-wing projecting to the rear, and a single-storey rear extension. On the front is a gabled porch, and the windows are casements, some with segmental heads.	II
Ifton Hall Farmhouse; 52.93883°N 3.00263°W	—	Late 16th or early 17th century (probable)	The farmhouse was later altered and extended. It is in roughcast timber framing, with extensions in red brick, and slate roofs. There is a front range with one storey and an attic, and parallel rear wings with two storeys. In the centre is a gabled porch, which is flanked by bow windows, and above are gabled half-dormers with moulded bressumers. Inside there is some exposed wattle and daub infill.	II
Pen-y-bryn; 52.91295°N 3.00562°W	—	16th or 17th century (probable)	The farmhouse is in roughcast timber framing and has slate roofs. It has an L-shaped plan, with a front range of one storey and an attic, and two bays, and a range of similar length at right angles to the rear, with two storeys. The windows are casements, and there is a gabled half-dormer.	II
Cross Lanes Farmhouse; 52.91943°N 3.00260°W	—	Early 17th century	The farmhouse was later extended. It is in roughcast timber framing, the extension is in red brick, and the roof is slated. There is one storey and an attic, and an L-shaped plan with a front range, a gabled extension at the rear, and a lean-to dairy in the angle. The windows are casements with segmental heads, and there is a gabled eaves dormer. Inside the rear range is an inglenook fireplace.	II
Rhos-y-Llan Farmhouse; 52.91979°N 3.01686°W	—	Early 17th century	The farmhouse was later altered and extended. It is in roughcast timber framing, partly clad or rebuilt in red brick, and it has a slate roof. There are two storeys and an attic, and an L-shaped plan, consisting of a three-bay hall range, and a two-bay cross-wing projecting to the right. The windows are casements, there is a full-height lean-to porch with a gabled hood, and above it is flat-roofed dormer.	II
19 Rhyn; 52.93035°N 3.02576°W	—	17th century	A timber framed cottage with plastered infill on a plinth, and with a slate roof. There are two bays, casement windows, and a rustic porch.	II
Barn, Plas Wigginton; 52.91457°N 2.99215°W		17th century	The barn is timber framed with red brick infill on a sandstone plinth, there is some rebuilding in red brick, and it has a corrugated iron roof. There are two levels, and the barn contains double and single doors, eaves hatches, and vents in various patterns.	II
Barn, Pen-y-bryn; 52.93965°N 3.01186°W	—	Late 17th century	The barn was extended in the 18th century. It is timber framed with red brick infill on a gritstone plinth, with some gritstone at the rear, the front largely rebuilt in red brick, and a corrugated iron roof with crow-stepped gables. There are two levels and four bays, and it contains two eaves hatches and three doorways.	II
Wigginton Hall and wall 52.91254°N 2.99087°W		1683	The house probably incorporates earlier material. It is in red brick on a plinth, with a rendered left gable end, a moulded string course, carved wooden corbels, and a slate roof. There are two storeys and an attic, and an L-shaped plan, consisting of main block with three bays divided by pilasters, and a rear range. The central doorway has a moulded surround, the windows are casements, above the door is a datestone in the shape of a shield, and over that is a slate-hung gabled dormer. Attached to the right of the house is a red brick wall with sandstone coping about 30 metres (98 ft) long.	II
1–4 Church Terrace; 52.92008°N 3.00982°W		1698	A row of almshouses, converted into a school in 1810, and later into four cottages. They are in red brick with angle quoins, a moulded eaves cornice, and a hipped slate roof. There is a single storey, and eight bays, the middle two bays projecting slightly under a pediment. The doorways have fanlights, and the windows are casements. In the pediment is a datestone of 1810, and there is a datestone of 1698 in the right end wall.	II
Sundial; 52.91974°N 3.00915°W	—	1729	The sundial, which was restored in 1778 and again in 1841, is in the churchyard of St Martin's Church. It is in sandstone, and consists of a baluster-like column with a moulded plinth and capping, standing on three circular steps. On the top step is an inscription.	II
Brookhouse Bridge; 52.91555°N 3.03654°W	—	1795	The bridge carries a road over the Morlas Brook. It is in sandstone with a red brick parapet, and consists of three segmental arches. The bridge has a string course, projecting keystones, a coped parapet, square corner piers, and two cutwaters on the west side.	II
Chirk Bridge; 52.92778°N 3.05701°W		c. 1798	The bridge was designed by Thomas Telford, it was widened in the 1920s, and carries the B5070 road over the River Ceiriog. The bridge is in sandstone, and consists of a single segmental arch. It has a projecting keystone, rusticated voussoirs, a flat string course, pilasters, a coped parapet, and rectangular corner piers.	II
Village pound 52.91953°N 3.00759°W		Late 18th or early 19th century	The pound is in sandstone, the interior is rendered, and it has a coped parapet. There is a square plan, and the entrance is on the north side.	II
Lady's Bridge, gate piers, gates and railings 52.93181°N 3.03126°W	—	c. 1808 (probable)	The bridge carries a track over the River Ceiriog. It is in sandstone and consists of a single elliptical arch. The bridge has rusticated voussoirs, keystones, a flat string course, pilasters, and an embattled parapet. On the east side are sandstone gate piers with a square section, moulded panels and capping, and pyramidal caps. The gates and railings are in wrought iron.	II
Lady's Bridge Lodge; 52.93183°N 3.03097°W	—	c. 1808–12	The lodge is built with cobblestones and tree trunks, and has a slate roof with fretted bargeboards and carved pendants. There is a single storey, a U-shaped plan, and a lean-to at the rear. The doorway has a pointed arch, the windows have ogee heads, and some are latticed. The lean-to is in limestone with some cobblestones.	II
Summerhouse near Lady's Bridge Lodge; 52.93142°N 3.02926°W	—	c. 1808–12	The summerhouse is in red brick with sandstone dressings, a moulded cornice, an embattled parapet, a pediment with a blind quatrefoil, and a corrugated iron roof, and is in Gothic style. It has a polygonal plan, and three pointed arches with pilasters with ornamental finials.	II
Bryngwilla Lodge; 52.92020°N 3.03794°W		Early 19th century	The lodge, later used for other purposes, is in sandstone, it has an embattled parapet and a slate roof, and is in Gothic style. In the centre is an arched entrance flanked at the front and the rear by octagonal turrets with spike finials. Outside this are single-bays ranges with cornices, also with corner turrets, and with flanking side walls. The archway contains decorative wrought iron gates.	II
Barn, Ifton Hall Farm; 52.93902°N 3.00301°W	—	Mid 19th century	The barn incorporates a 14th or 15th-century cruck truss. It is in red brick and stone, and has a corrugated iron roof and two levels. The barn contains four eaves hatches, three segmental-headed doorways, and rectangular air vents. Inside is a true cruck truss.	II
War memorial 52.92453°N 3.00759°W		1923	The war memorial stands in a square enclosure on a concrete platform surrounded by metal railings, and is in sandstone. It consists of a Celtic cross with knotwork design on the cross head, on a tapered shaft and plinth, and a base of two steps. There is an inscription on the lower part of the shaft, and on the plinth and on the top step are the names of those lost in the two World Wars. There is also a marble plaque commemorating the anniversaries of VE and VJ Days.	II
