= Listed buildings in Weston Rhyn =

Weston Rhyn is a civil parish in Shropshire, England. It contains 21 listed buildings that are recorded in the National Heritage List for England. Of these, three are listed at Grade II*, the middle of the three grades, and the others are at Grade II, the lowest grade. The parish contains the village of Weston Rhyn and the surrounding countryside. The Llangollen Canal passes through the parish and the listed structures associated with it are an aqueduct and a road bridge. Many of the other listed buildings are houses and associated structures, farmhouses and farm buildings, the earliest of which are timber framed or have timber framed cores. The other listed buildings include a road bridge, two sets of limekilns, three milestones, a bee bole, a viaduct, a folly in the form of a stone circle, a church, a Sunday school, and a war memorial.

== Key ==
Grade	Criteria
II*	Particularly important buildings of more than special interest
II	Buildings of national importance and special interest

== Buildings ==
Name and location	Photograph	Date	Notes	Grade
Weston Hall; 52.90857°N 3.06499°W	—	15th century	A manor house, later a farmhouse, the original part is timber framed with cruck construction, consisting of a three-bay single-storey hall, the outer walls later replaced in brick. In the late 16th century a cross-wing was added. This is timber framed with rendered and painted brick infill, and has two storeys and an attic. In the 17th century a further wing was added at right angles to the cross-wing; this is in rendered timber framing. There are later lean-tos, and all the roofs are slated. The cross-wing has a jettied upper storey and attic, with chamfered bressumers, and the windows are casements. Inside there are cruck trusses.	II*
Berllandeg Farmhouse; 52.92067°N 3.05111°W	—	17th century	The farmhouse was remodelled in the 18th century, and has been altered since. It is partly timber framed with red brick infill, and partly in red brick, on a high chamfered stone plinth, with a band and slate roofs, hipped to the front. There are two storeys, and a U-shaped plan, with a three-bay range, two rear gabled ranges, and a brick outshut on the right rear range. In the centre is a doorway with a rectangular fanlight, the windows are sashes, and there is a wedge-shaped illegible datestone.	II
Preesgweene Hall; 52.91782°N 3.05533°W	—	Mid 17th century	The hall was remodelled in 1834. It is in roughcast brick on a stone plinth, probably with a timber framed core, and has a coped parapet with pointed corner finials, and a slate roof. There are three storeys, a main range with three bays, and a two-bay rear range. The windows are sashes with shaped plastered lintels, those in the middle floor with carvings of human heads and leaves. On the front is a hip roofed verandah, two French windows, and a central doorway with an open stone Roman Doric pedimented porch with metopes and triglyphs. Above the door is a fanlight with fluted corner spandrels.	II
Moreton Hall and walls 52.91397°N 3.04869°W		Mid to late 17th century	A manor house, later a farmhouse, and then part of a school, it was extended in the 19th century. The building is in red brick with sandstone dressings, angle quoins, a moulded string course, a modillion eaves cornice, and a hipped tile roof. There are two storeys and an attic, and an H-shaped plan consisting of a hall range of three bays, and two-bay cross-wings. The central doorway has a moulded surround and a cambered arch, and the windows are mullioned or mullioned and transomed. Attached to each sides of the house are red brick walls with sandstone coping, both of which are about 60 metres (200 ft) long.	II
High Gables; 52.92584°N 3.04632°W	—	Late 17th century (probable)	The farmhouse was later altered, and extended in about 1890. It is in roughcast timber framing with a slate roof. The farmhouse consists of a hall range with one storey and an attic and two bays, a single-bay gabled cross-wing slightly projecting to the right, a later two-storey extension to the left, and a lean-to dairy at the rear. The windows are a mix of casements, cross windows and sashes, and there are gabled half-dormers and a flat-roofed dormer.	II
Fron Farmhouse; 52.91000°N 3.09301°W	—	1692	The farmhouse has been altered and it was extended in 1905. It is in limestone with angle quoins and slate roofs. The original part has an L-shaped plan, and the extension is on the left. There are two storeys, with an attic in the cross-wing. The doorway has a lean-to hood, and most of the windows are casements.	II
Tyn-y-Rhos Hall; 52.91730°N 3.08450°W	—	1711	A farmhouse, later a private house, it is a remodelling of an earlier house. The house is built in rendered timber framing, limestone and brick, and has slate roofs. There are two storeys, and an attic on the cross-wing. On the front are four gables and five bays, and the windows are mullioned and transomed in moulded surrounds. There is a canted bay window, the gables have cusped bargeboards and pointed finials, and the left three bays have imitation angle quoins. On the front is an open lean-to porch with fluted Doric columns, in the left bay is a doorway with a pedimented hood containing carving a sea monsters, and in the right bay is another doorway with a pedimented hood.	II
Pont-Faen Bridge; 52.92625°N 3.07221°W		Late 18th century	The bridge carries a road from Wales into Shropshire over the River Ceiriog. It is in limestone and consists of a single segmental arch. The bridge has a flat string course and a parapet.	II
Chirk Aqueduct; 52.92815°N 3.06204°W		1795–1801	The aqueduct carries the Llangollen Canal over the valley of the River Ceiriog, and was designed by William Jessop and Thomas Telford. It is in limestone with a cast iron trough, and consists of ten round-headed arches with keystones and imposts divided by pilaster strips. The aqueduct is about 70 feet (21 m) high and 696 feet (212 m) long, with curving walls to the north and south. On the east side are cast iron railings.	II*
Chirkbank Bridge; 52.92681°N 3.05453°W		c. 1800	This in bridge No. 21 over the Llangollen Canal, carrying Quinta Bank over the canal. It is in limestone, and consists of a single cambered arch. The bridge has a string course, a parapet, a lintel and a projecting keystone. There are rectangular corner piers with shallow pyramidal caps.	II
Limekilns at NGR SJ 2650 3742; 52.92902°N 3.09463°W	—	Early 19th century	The limekilns are in limestone, and consist of two round arches to the left and two segmental arches to the right. Between the pairs of arches is a buttress, and to the rear are the remains of the kilns.	II
Limekilns at NGR SJ 2539 3506; 52.90775°N 3.11052°W	—	Early 19th century	The limekilns are in limestone, and have a segmental-headed arch to the left and an elliptical arch to the right.	II
Milestone at NGR SJ 2746 3656; 52.92147°N 3.08012°W	—	Early 19th century (probable)	The milestone is on the north side of the road, and is in limestone. It is rectangular with a rounded top and a cast iron plate. The milestone is partly buried and the only legible inscription is the distance in miles to Ellesmere.	II
Milestone at NGR SJ 2955 3707; 52.92645°N 3.04941°W		1826–27	The milestone is on the north side of the B5070 road. It is in limestone, and has a slightly recessed cast iron plate inscribed with the distances to Holyhead, and to "SALOP" (Shrewsbury).	II
Milestone at NGR SJ 29977 35737; 52.91436°N 3.04270°W		1826–27	The milestone is on the west side of the A5 road. It is in limestone, and has a slightly recessed cast iron plate inscribed with the distances to Holyhead, and to "SALOP" (Shrewsbury).	II
Bee bole, Preesgweene Hall; 52.91794°N 3.05559°W	—	c. 1834 (probable)	The bee bole is in red brick with stone coping, and is in Gothic style. There are two tiers of three pointed arches with stone shelves over two rectangular openings. In the corners are chamfered piers with blind mock gun-loops and coped gables. To the rear is a stone shed with an embattled parapet.	II
Chirk Viaduct; 52.92810°N 3.06237°W		1848	The viaduct was built by the Shrewsbury and Chester Railway to carry its line over the valley of the River Ceiriog. It is in limestone with some yellow engineering brick, and consists of 16 elliptical arches. The central arches have pointed voussoirs, projecting keystones and moulded imposts, a modillioned cornice, and a plain parapet. The abutments have shallow pediments on corbelled cornices, and round-headed niches with moulded impost bands and projecting moulded keystones. The viaduct is about 106 feet (32 m) high and 2,049 feet (625 m) long.	II*
Stone Circle; 52.91982°N 3.07156°W		c. 1850–60	A folly in the form of a limestone circle, mimicking Stonehenge. There is an outer circle of orthostats with a continuous lintel, and inside are trilithons in a U-shape, some paired. The circle is partly ruinous.	II
Quinta Congregational Church; 52.91632°N 3.07084°W		1858	The church is in sandstone and has a banded slate roof with coped verges and ornamental cresting, and is in Decorated style. It consists of a nave with a south porch, a north aisle, a chancel and north vestry, and a southwest steeple. The steeple has an octagonal open bell stage, and a spire with a weathervane.	II
Sunday School; 52.91687°N 3.06841°W		1882	The school is in Ruabon brick and red terracotta, and has tile roofs with ceramic cresting and finials. There is one storey and an attic. At the roadside corner is a circular drum tower with a conical roof and an elaborate cast iron finial, and below the cone is continuous horizontal slit window. Most of the windows are mullioned, and there are gabled dormers. In the gable ends are glazed ceramic panels, and there is an oval medallion.	II
War memorial 52.91381°N 3.06690°W		1921	The war memorial is by a road junction and is in Darley Dale stone. It consists of a Celtic-style wheel-head cross on a rectangular tapering shaft on an octagonal plinth. There are plaques with inscriptions and the names of those lost in the two World Wars. The base of the memorial incorporates four stone seats and is surrounded by a circular dark grey stone decorative paved area.	II
