= Sas Metcalfe =

Music industry executive

- Origin: British
- Occupation: Music industry executive
- Years active: 1982–present
- Labels: Kobalt Music, EMI Records, Warner Chappell Music, Arista Records

Sas Metcalfe is President, Global Creative, of Kobalt Music and has been at the company since it was founded in 2001. She is a British music executive, based in Los Angeles, who has worked her entire career in the music industry, for a number of music publishers and record labels signing artists such as Radiohead, Bjork, Snow Patrol, Alt-J, David Gray, Kelly Clarkson, Paul McCartney and Childish Gambino.

Metcalfe was honoured in Billboard's Women In Music awards in 2015 and 2016.

== Early life and career ==
Sas Metcalfe (née Cooke) was born in Wales, United Kingdom, and studied at Moreton Hall after which she studied at Cardiff University, then moved to West London to pursue a career in the music industry.

Her first job was as a secretary at CBS Records in London which led to an A&R Scout position at newly formed independent label, Rocking Horse Records. In 1986, she became an A&R Manager at Arista Records, a position she held for three years. She then spent eight years as Head of A&R at Warner/Chappell, before moving to EMI for the same role, which she occupied for another three years.

In 1989, Metcalfe moved into music publishing and spent eight years at Warner Chappell Music UK, where she worked her way up from A&R Manager to Head of A&R. During her time at Warner Chappell she signed artists such as Radiohead, David Gray and EMF. From 1997 to 2000 she was an A&R Manager at EMI Records in London working with artists including Vanessa Mae and Damage.

== Kobalt Music ==
Metcalfe was the first person to be employed when Kobalt Music was founded by Willard Ahdritz in 2001. Her first signing was artist Badly Drawn Boy. Metcalfe has built Kobalt into a major publishing company, representing over 600,000 songs and with a 40% share of the Top 100 hits in the UK and US.

After 12 years of helping to build the company from its London offices, Metcalfe moved to Los Angeles in August 2012 to develop and manage Kobalt's LA office whilst continuing her role as President, Global Creative.

Since her first signing, Mercury Prize winner, Badly Drawn Boy she has been instrumental in bringing a long list of talented writers and artists to Kobalt such as Max Martin, Dr Luke, Ryan Tedder, Lindy Robbins, Dave Grohl, Paul McCartney, Pearl Jam, Kelly Clarkson and Maroon 5

== Personal life ==
In October 1988, Metcalfe married her husband, Simon. They have two daughters, Lily and Alice.
