= Bronygarth =

Village in Shropshire, England

Coordinates: 52.925°N 3.090°W

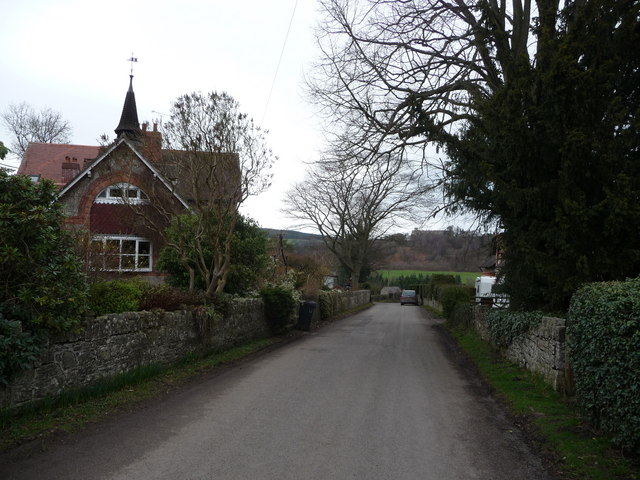
- Part of the village street at Bronygarth

- Location within Shropshire
- OS grid reference: SJ268370
- Civil parish: Weston Rhyn
- Unitary authority: Shropshire
- Ceremonial county: Shropshire
- Region: West Midlands
- Country: England
- Sovereign state: United Kingdom
- Post town: OSWESTRY
- Postcode district: SY10
- Dialling code: 01691
- Police: West Mercia
- Fire: Shropshire
- Ambulance: West Midlands
- UK Parliament: North Shropshire

Bronygarth is a small village in the Ceiriog Valley near Oswestry in Shropshire, England at grid reference SJ268370. The village is on the England–Wales border with some buildings in Wales in the Glyntraian local government community.

== History ==
Bronygarth lies on Offa's Dyke, the massive earthwork constructed in the late 8th century by Offa, King of Mercia, as a boundary between Saxon Mercia and Celtic Wales. The section of the dyke between Castle Mill and Craignant remains well preserved. Although the dyke passed directly through Bronygarth, the area remained strongly Welsh in culture, customs and language. Settlements were mainly in the valley, along the banks of the River Ceiriog, but with a small number of farms extending higher up the mountainside.

Two Celtic carved stone heads were uncovered at Well Cottage in Bronygarth and are now on display at the British Museum.

The name Bronygarth appears in documents as far back as the 12th Century and translates into English as "Breast of the Hill" and is thought to have formed part of a hunting estate.

Bronygarth became part of the Traian in the Lordship of Oswestry which was associated with the Fitzalan dynasty for many centuries. Throughout the later Middle Ages the area was dominated by Chirk Castle and the Myddleton family.

In 1536, the Act of Union of England and Wales placed all of the Lordship of Oswestry within the county of Shropshire in England.

Bronygarth was formerly part of the ancient Parish of St. Martin's. However, in 1870, the neighbouring townships of Weston Rhyn and Bronygarth were formed into the new Parish of Weston Rhyn.

The first school was built in Bronygarth in 1872. Close by the school stands a toll house on the Bronygarth and Wern turnpike road, which connected to the main Cardiff to Chester highway at Pontfaen. Also opposite the 'Old school' is a house which was occupied by the headmaster until it was sold privately

The area was highly dependent on agriculture but limestone was also quarried. Lime kilns are still present and can be seen along the road through the village.

The village does not have a village hall. In 2004 the villagers built two Mongolian yurts from local timber. The coverings were supplied by the local Hot Air Balloon company, Lindstrand Hot Air Balloons. The yurts are used for village parties and private functions for the residents. The party to celebrate their completion was attended by the Mongolian ambassador, His Excellency Dalrain Davaasambuu.

== Leisure ==
Bronygarth lies on both the Offa's Dyke long-distance footpath and the shorter Ceiriog Trail.

== Sources ==
- G. G. Lerry, "Collieries of Denbighshire", 1968
- C. Neville Hurdsman, "A History of the Parishes of St. Martin's & Weston Rhyn" 2003
