= Charles Conde =

Welsh footballer

Personal information
- Date of birth: 1859
- Place of birth: Chirk, Denbighshire, Wales
- Date of death: March 1936 (aged 76–77)
- Place of death: Weston Rhyn, Shropshire, England
- Position: Half back

Senior career*
Years	Team	Apps	(Gls)
1878-1886	Chirk		

International career
1884	Wales	3	(0)
- * Club domestic league appearances and goals

Charles Conde (1859 – March 1936) was a Welsh international footballer. He was part of the Wales national football team, playing 3 matches. He played his first match on 9 February 1884 against Ireland and his last match on 29 March 1884 against Scotland.

== See also ==
- List of Wales international footballers (alphabetical)
