= Ludlow College =

Sixth form college in Ludlow, Shropshire, England

Coordinates: 52.3673°N 2.7217°W

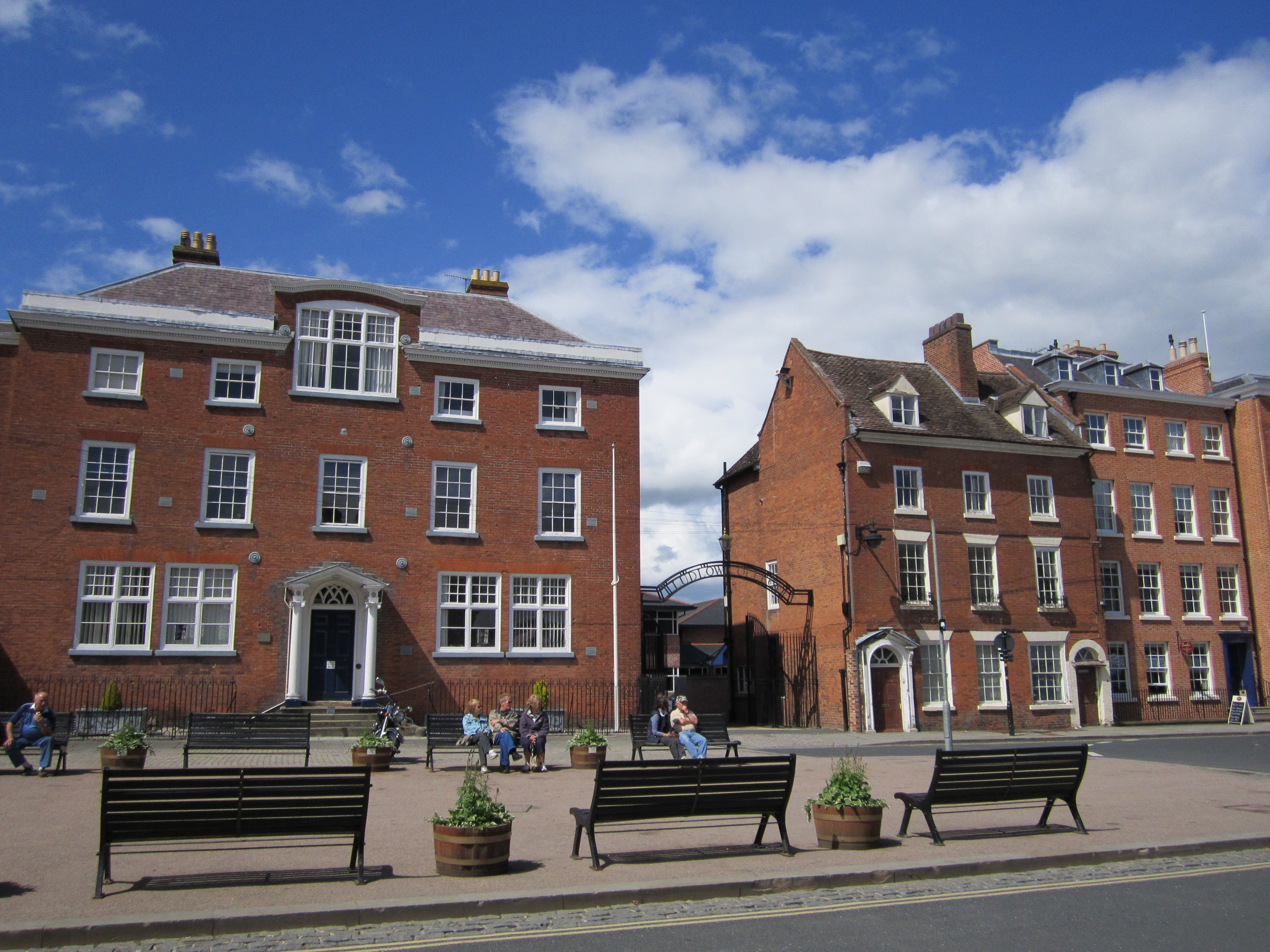
The college buildings on Castle Square.

Ludlow College is a sixth form college situated in the heart of Ludlow, Shropshire, England. It now forms part of the Herefordshire and Ludlow College, though retains its own identity.

== History ==
Its history traces back to the reign of King John in 13th century. After centuries of being an exclusively boys school, in 1967 the then Ludlow Grammar School merged with Ludlow Girls High School, the whole retaining the name Ludlow Grammar School. A peculiarity of the boys Grammar School was that there was no 1st year, with new boys entering in the 2nd year. Ludlow Grammar School was founded c. 1200, making it one of the oldest educational institutions in England. In 1977 the (merged) grammar school became Ludlow College, with secondary education in the town instead being provided only by the Ludlow Church of England School.

== Campus ==
The original boys school is in ancient stone and brick buildings at the bottom of Mill Street, including the Palmers Hall, a Grade II* listed building. The girls school was founded in an expansive Georgian red-brick mansion at the top of Mill Street/on Castle Square. Today three sites are used by the college – Castle Square (the former girls school), Mill Street (the former boys school) and Lower Mill Street.

== Notable alumni ==
=== Ludlow Grammar School ===
- Wynn Normington Hugh-Jones – diplomat, administrator and Liberal Party official
- P. D. James – novelist and life peer
- Adrian Jones – sculptor and painter
- Keith Jones – former Dean of York
- John Marston – founder of Sunbeam Cycles
- Richard Stanley Hawks Moody – distinguished British Army Colonel and military historian
- Thomas Wright – writer, scholar, and antiquarian

=== Ludlow College ===
- Lark Atkin-Davies - women's rugby player
- Nicholas Grey – founder of Grey Technology (Gtech) design and manufacturing company
- Justin Pearson - stuntman

== See also ==
- Grade II* listed buildings in Shropshire Council (H–Z)
- Listed buildings in Ludlow (northern area)
