= St Martin's School, Shropshire =

St Martin's School

Location
- Moors Bank; St Martin's, Shropshire, SY10 7BD; England; 52°55′06″N 3°01′18″W

Information
- Type: Academy
- Motto: Selfless, Self Assured & Successful.
- Established: 1st September 2012
- Local authority: Shropshire Council
- Department for Education URN: 143142 Tables
- Ofsted: Reports
- Head Teacher: Alison Pope
- Age: 3 to 16
- Enrolment: 723 as of September 2025
- Houses: Ifton, Heath, Rhyn, Moors.
- Colours: Purple, silver, green and black
- Publication: The Link
- Website: www.stmartins3-16.org

St. Martin's School 3-16 Learning Community (formerly Rhyn Park School and Performing Arts College) is a mixed all-through school situated in St. Martin's, near Oswestry in the county of Shropshire, England. The school educates students from the ages of 3–16.

St. Martins School was previously awarded specialist status as a Performing Arts College, supplying facilities and education in creative arts to students from around the county. The school was known as Rhyn Park School and Performing Arts College from 1958 to 2011. In September 2016 the school converted to academy status.

== Facilities ==
There is a theater with stage lighting and sound. There are three ICT suites and a suite of Apple Mac computers in the music room. A sound recording and editing suite is available.

The school has three science laboratories with specialist equipment for practical sessions and a food technology kitchen. There is a resistant materials room complete with power tools. There are also generic classrooms for other subjects.

== Refurbishment ==
Through the school year of 2013–2014, the school underwent refurbishment and re-build, which saw a library and reception area (jointly named the "Hub") being built along the front of the school, replacing the former reception and administration offices. There was also a large area built for the primary school, with the Humanities subject area and old library being converted into classrooms for the younger pupils.

=== Secondary buildings ===
Work began in the summer of 2013, which saw the completion of an extended car park near the sports hall, new toilets and complete refurbishment of the languages subject area. In February of the following year, the "Hub" was finished and opened to the students. This area incorporates the library, meeting room, admin offices and reception in an open-plan area. A new courtyard was completed over the following months and is situated to the rear of the library.

=== Primary buildings ===
New buildings were built to accommodate the primary school and nursery. The humanities subject areas were shut off and converted into primary classrooms, while the old library was converted into corridors and a larger classroom. Each classroom is equipped with a fully interactive touchscreen monitor, books and other learning resources.

=== Fire incident ===
On 21 September 2025, a major fire broke out at St Martin's School. The incident began around 5 pm, with multiple fire engines attending. The school informed parents that the blaze may have been linked to its solar panels and was not believed to be deliberate. No casualties were reported. As a result of the fire, the school announced closure for all pupils the following day while damage was assessed.
