= Weston Rhyn =

Village in Shropshire, England

Coordinates: 52.914°N 3.067°W

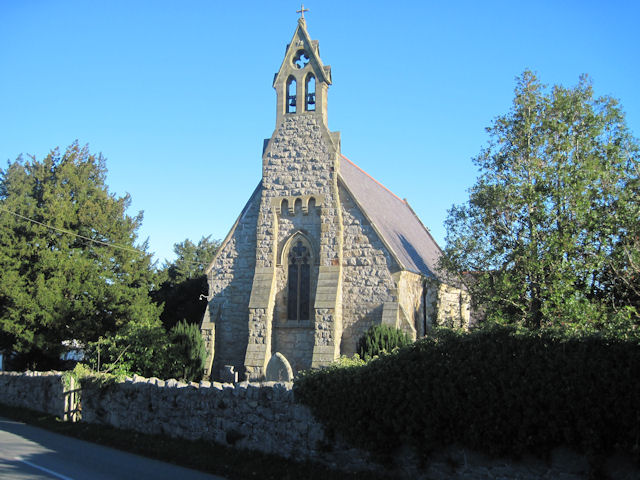
- St John's church, Weston Rhyn

- Location within Shropshire
- Population: 2,850 (2011)
- OS grid reference: SJ282357
- Civil parish: Weston Rhyn
- Unitary authority: Shropshire
- Ceremonial county: Shropshire
- Region: West Midlands
- Country: England
- Sovereign state: United Kingdom
- Post town: OSWESTRY
- Postcode district: SY10
- Dialling code: 01691
- Police: West Mercia
- Fire: Shropshire
- Ambulance: West Midlands
- UK Parliament: North Shropshire

Weston Rhyn is a large village and civil parish in Shropshire, England. It lies between the towns of Chirk, in Wales, and Oswestry, in England.

The civil parish, which also includes Bronygarth, Pentre-Newydd and a number of small hamlets, had a total population of 2,668 at the 2001 census, rising to 2,850 at the 2011 Census.

== Etymology ==
Tun or ton means a settlement or hamlet, the origin of the name 'Rhyn' appears to start from the Welsh names for Rome and Roman (as a person), Rhufain and Rhufon, leading to Rhun or/and Rhyn as "the proper name of a man" and Rhyon as a soldier.

== History ==
In 1086 Weston Rhyn was recorded as Westune in the Domesday Book. Listed as a small settlement, it was within the hundred of Merset and the county of Shropshire.

Originally the townships of Weston Rhyn and Bronygarth were in the Parish of St. Martins. In 1870 they were formed into a separate ecclesiastical district known as “the Lodge” (the inn still bears its name), and then in 1898 into the civil parish of Weston Rhyn.

== Transport, facilities ==
The village is on the Shrewsbury to Chester railway line, but has no station. Its former station of Preesgweene (later known as Weston Rhyn) closed in 1960. The nearest stations today are Chirk and Gobowen. Train services are provided by Transport for Wales. The village lies to the west of the A5 trunk road.

It is surrounded by beautiful countryside, the Welsh hills and Offa's Dyke to the west, and the River Ceiriog to the north. Originally a mining village, the pits have long since closed. Despite this, the village has in recent years expanded, with people working locally or commuting as far as Chester, Shrewsbury, Liverpool, Birmingham and Manchester.

Weston Rhyn has two churches (Quinta Independent Evangelical Church and St John's Church of England), two pubs, Chinese takeaway/chip shop, village hall, primary school, Sunday School and general store. Close to Weston Rhyn is the Quinta Christian Centre, a conference centre and home to the missionary organisation Operation Mobilisation.

== Notable people ==
- Allan Heywood Bright (1862-1941), Liberal politician, lived at Weston Rhyn when he served as M.P. for Oswestry 1904-1906
- Charles Conde (1859-1936), Wales international footballer, died at Weston Rhyn
- Dr Frederick William Price FRSE (1873-1957) cardiologist and medical author, born at Weston Rhyn
- Glyn James (1941- ) professional footballer, played for Blackpool and as a Wales international, grew up in Weston Rhyn.

== Sport ==
AFC Weston Rhyn were formed in 2023, and are based in Weston Rhyn. They currently compete in North East Wales Football League.

== See also ==
- Listed buildings in Weston Rhyn

== Sources ==
- G. G. Lerry, "Collieries of Denbighshire", 1968
- C. Neville Hurdsman, "A History of the Parishes of St. Martin's & Weston Rhyn" 2003
