= Moreton Hall School =

Moreton Hall

Location
- Weston Rhyn; Oswestry, Shropshire, SY11 3EW; England
- Coordinates: 52.9140°N 3.0486°W

Information
- Type: Private day and boarding school
- Motto: Embrace, Achieve, Enjoy
- Established: 1913
- Founder: Ellen Lloyd-Williams
- Local authority: Shropshire
- Department for Education URN: 123604 Tables
- Principal: Michael Brewer
- Staff: 220~
- Gender: Girls (6 months–18), boys (6 months–11)
- Age: 6 months to 18
- Enrolment: 490~
- Houses: Calvert, Norton, Roberts, Vincent
- Colour: Blue
- Former pupils: Old Moretonians
- School Song: Gaude Plebs Redemptionis
- Website: www.moretonhall.org

Moreton Hall is a private boarding and day school for girls aged 6 months to 18 and boys aged 6 months to 11, situated in North Shropshire four miles from the market town of Oswestry. Founded in 1913, Moreton Hall celebrated its centenary in 2012/13. Much of the early history of the school is unrecorded, but Michael Charlesworth, chairman of the Governors for twelve years, wrote the "Story of Moreton Hall" to mark the ninetieth anniversary.

== History ==
=== Beginnings ===
Ellen Augusta Crawley Lloyd-Williams was left with a family of two sons and nine daughters to care for on the death of her husband, John Jordan Lloyd-Williams, who had been headmaster of Oswestry School. She had already addressed the problem of educating her family by setting up a small school in 1913, in Lloran house, which was once a boarding house for Oswestry School. Among the boarders were her three youngest daughters, some of their cousins and friends. There were also two boys on the rolls. Elder sisters Grace and Mary joined the teaching staff. Ellen bought Moreton Hall in 1919.

=== Development ===
Ellen died in 1940. She was succeeded by her daughter, Mary, a musician. Mary died in 1945 at a relatively young age and was commemorated by a bronze sculpture by Karel Vogel depicting three pupils playing musical instruments. Her sister Bronwyn Lloyd-Williams had trained at the Bedford College of Physical Training and was a freelance journalist in London. She had frequently visited Moreton Hall, choreographing dance productions, teaching lacrosse (she had captained Wales) and cricket and leading rambles in the surrounding countryside. She left her career to take on the headship and continued in this role until her resignation, soon followed by her death in 1973. This ended the "family" period of the school which continued its development as an educational trust. Roger Goolden (1933–2014), appointed by Bronwen Lloyd-Williams in 1963, held the position of Clerk of Works until 1993. He oversaw a significant extension of the school buildings, including a boarding block and swimming pool.

=== Present day ===
The school, a private limited company, is set in 100 acres (40 ha) of parkland on the Shropshire/Wrexham border, four miles from the market town of Oswestry and an hour from Manchester Airport and Birmingham Airport. The school is made up of two parts: Moreton Hall Prep (the Junior School) for boys and girls aged 3–11 and the senior school for girls aged 11 and over. First Steps Nursery opened in 2007 for 1- to 3-year-olds. The Principal is Michael Brewer and the Head of Moreton Hall Prep, Deborah Speakman. Michael Brewer was appointed the new Principal of Moreton Hall as of September 2023.

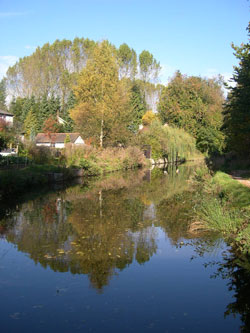
Shropshire countryside

== Academics ==
Moreton Hall offers a range of subjects at both GCSE and A Level.

The Midyis Value Added League Table produced by Durham University in 2010 and again in 2011 ranks Moreton Hall as the top school nationally in value added ratings.

== Extra-curricular ==
=== Music ===
Moreton Hall has a music department offering a wide range of musical activities to GCSE and A Level. The school has a range of musical groups and ensembles for all ages and abilities.

=== Sport ===
Lacrosse and hockey are the principal winter sports; regularly girls are selected from the senior teams to represent the Junior Midlands Lacrosse team at the national territorial tournament. The school 2nd team are the current Welsh Lacrosse Association Rally champions. The School's first team recently became national lacrosse champions in 2024.

Hockey is also played, with at least one team every year representing Shropshire at the Midland Regional Hockey Association Finals. Cross-country is another key winter sport, with many junior and senior girls being selected to represent the county and in 2010 the Junior team qualified for the English Schools' Cross Country National Finals. Fourteen outdoor courts and one county-size indoor court are available for tennis. Athletics continues to grow as a major sport at Moreton during the summer term. Students have the opportunity to train at a track in Wrexham.

=== Drama and public speaking ===
Performing arts activities include music, drama, verse speaking, public speaking and debating. The Senior and Middle School put on two major plays/musicals every year and the Junior School put on plays throughout the year. Students regularly take part in speaking and debating competitions such as the Business and Professional Women's Public Speaking Competition, the Shropshire Festival of Verse and Prose and Thomas Cranmer Awards.

=== Moreton Enterprises ===
Moreton Enterprises is a business venture which was established at the school 25 years ago. There are seven retail businesses and two service based businesses (Events Management and Environmental Services). The businesses are all managed by the Lower Sixth (Year 12) girls. An early Enterprise was the re-opening of nearby Gobowen railway station, headed by geography teacher David Lloyd and pupils at the school. David Lloyd is remembered by having a locomotive of the former Wrexham & Shropshire Railway company named after him.

== Noted Old Moretonians ==
- Lois Baxter - actress
- Zanny Minton Beddoes – editor of The Economist
- Dame Linda Dobbs – high court judge
- Sas Metcalfe – President, Global Creative, of Kobalt Music
- Thea Musgrave – composer and musician
- Sheila Reid – actress
- Kyffin Williams – landscape painter
- Amanda Milling - Conservative politician
- Jugnu Mohsin – Pakistani journalist

== See also ==
- Listed buildings in Weston Rhyn
