= Ludlow Church of England School =

Location
- Ludlow; Shropshire, SY8 1GJ; England
- Coordinates: 52.377°N 2.728°W

Information
- Type: Academy
- Motto: Excellence Together
- Religious affiliation: Church of England
- Local authority: Shropshire Council
- Department for Education URN: 144435 Tables
- Ofsted: Reports
- Headteacher: Michael Stoppard
- Gender: coeducational
- Age: 11 to 16
- Enrolment: 800
- Houses: St. Giles, St. John, St. Laurence and St. Peter
- Website: http://www.ludlowschool.com/

Ludlow Church of England School is a coeducational Church of England secondary school located in Ludlow, Shropshire, England.

The school achieved the Technology College specialisation in 2003, which later also led to it becoming a Sports College, holding the Sportsmark award.

The 2006 Ofsted described it as "a happy school which is improving well," and rated the progress of special education students as "exceptional". It was judged Good in its 2015 inspection. In 2008 the school achieved 56% of students with 5 A*-C grades (including English and maths) on their GCSEs.

Originally a voluntary controlled school administered by Shropshire Council, Ludlow Church of England School converted to academy status in April 2017. It is now sponsored by the Diocese of Hereford Academy Trust.

== See also ==
- Ludlow College
