= St Martin's, Shropshire =

Village and civil parish in Shropshire, England

Coordinates: 52.919°N 3.008°W

St Martin's
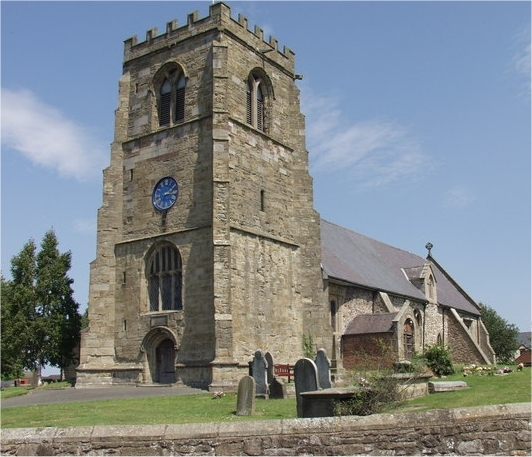
- St Martin's Parish Church

- Location within Shropshire
- OS grid reference: SJ322362
- Civil parish: St Martin's
- Unitary authority: Shropshire
- Ceremonial county: Shropshire
- Region: West Midlands
- Country: England
- Sovereign state: United Kingdom
- Post town: OSWESTRY
- Postcode district: SY11
- Dialling code: 01691
- Police: West Mercia
- Fire: Shropshire
- Ambulance: West Midlands
- UK Parliament: North Shropshire
- Website: stmartinsparish.org.uk

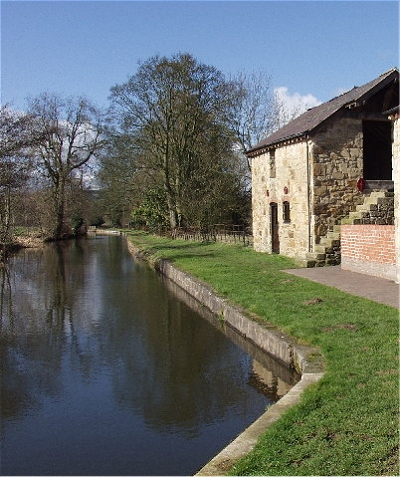
The Llangollen Canal at St. Martin's Moor

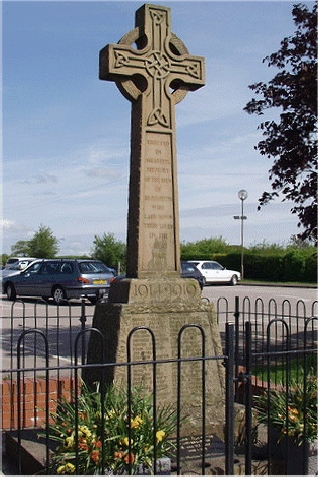
The First World War Memorial at St. Martin's

St Martin's (Welsh: Llanfarthin) is a village and civil parish in Shropshire, England, just north of Oswestry and east of Chirk, Wales on the England–Wales border.

== History ==
The ancient Parish of St Martin's was made up of the townships of Ifton, Wiggington, Bronygarth and Weston Rhyn. Each of these townships bordered Wales, with the River Ceiriog and the River Dee forming the border. However, in 1870, the townships of Weston Rhyn and Bronygarth were formed into the new Parish of Weston Rhyn.

The church at St Martin's is dedicated to St Martin of Tours and the parish was part of the Welsh Diocese of St Asaph until 1920 when it was transferred to the English Diocese of Lichfield under the Welsh Church Act 1914.

The area was, for centuries, under the influence of nearby Chirk Castle and, later, the Trevor family of Brynkinallt (Welsh: Bryncunallt) in Chirk.

== Governance ==
Although the population of the parish involved can be found under Ellesmere Rural an electoral ward still exists in its own name. The population of this ward at the 2011 Census was 4,333.

== Transport ==
Around the 16th century, a bridge was built across the River Ceiriog at Pontfaen as part of the Chester to Cardiff highway. Later the A5, the London-Shrewsbury-Holyhead trunk road was constructed by Thomas Telford through the parish of St Martin's, crossing into Wales via the bridge at Chirk Bank.

The Glyn Valley Tramway ran from Chirk through Pontfaen into the Ceiriog Valley.

In the 19th century a canal was constructed through St Martin's Moor by Thomas Telford linking the industrial areas around Ruabon to the canal network. This now forms part of the Llangollen Canal.

By 1848 the Chester to Ruabon railway line had been extended south to Shrewsbury, but only one station, Preesgweene (Welsh: Preesgwyn) (later known as Weston Rhyn), was built in St Martin's parish. Later however, branch lines were built to link the collieries in the area to the main rail network.

== Industry ==
Although predominantly an agricultural area, coal was mined in St Martin's for several centuries. The collieries at Ifton, Chirk Bank, Quinta, Trehowell, Moreton Hall and Preesgweene were, geologically, an extension of the Denbighshire coalfield. Coal production ceased in the area with the closure of the last remaining colliery in the area at Ifton in 1968. Ifton was the largest colliery in Shropshire and its workings crossed the border into Wales, linking up to the coal seams of the former collieries at Brynkinallt and Black Park.

== Education ==
St Martin's School is a primary and secondary school located in St Martin's.

== Sport ==
The village is represented in association football by St Martins FC who currently compete in the Shropshire County League Division One. They currently play at Park Hall in nearby Oswestry, groundsharing with Cymru Premier side The New Saints. There is also a Sunday league side The Keys FC that play their home games at the playing field.

== Notable people ==
Francis Williams, Editor of the Daily Herald and Governor of the BBC, (later life peer Baron Francis-Williams) born at St Martin's.

Ian Woosnam, Professional Golfer, grew up on his family's farm in St Martin's.

== See also ==
- Listed buildings in St Martin's, Shropshire
