= Grey Technology =

British company

Grey Technology (Gtech)
- Type: Private
- Industry: Technology
- Founded: 2001; 25 years ago
- Founder: Nick Grey
- Headquarters: Worcester, Worcestershire, United Kingdom
- Area served: Worldwide
- Key people: Nick Grey (Owner), Jothie Walford (Managing Director)
- Products: Vacuum cleaners, floor sweepers, grass trimmers, hedge trimmers, power tools
- Owner: Nick Grey
- Number of employees: 160 (2023)
- Website: gtech.co.uk

Grey Technology Ltd, which uses the trade mark Gtech, is an independent British company designing and manufacturing cordless home and garden appliances such as vacuum cleaners, floor sweepers, grass trimmers, lawn mowers, hedge trimmers and power tools.

The company is based in Worcester, Worcestershire.

== History ==
Gtech was founded by Nick Grey, who had previously worked at vacuum cleaner brand VAX. Working initially from his Worcestershire home, Nick Grey developed the world's first cordless floor sweeper, the SW01 cordless floor sweeper, in 2002. Since then Gtech have launched more floorcare products such as Multi, Pro and HyLite, as well as an eBike range, a garden range, and even an automated massage bed. Gtech has also designed several products on a 'white-label' basis for other brands.

In November 2012, Grey revealed that Gtech has been subject to several corporate espionage attempts from rival manufacturers.

Following success in the UK and Europe, Gtech is expanding to the USA, with products such as the AirRAM.

=== Founder ===
Nick Grey (born 12 July 1968) is the British designer and inventor who founded Grey Technology. Grey was born in Spetchley, Worcestershire, and attended Aston Fields Middle School. The Grey family spent three years in Roscommon, Ireland, before resettling in Worcestershire in 1979. Grey studied at Ludlow College. Grey and Gtech are based in Worcestershire.

Grey won the Insider Media Limited award for innovation in 2011. He has been profiled by British newspapers, and has been interviewed in the UK press about issues facing start-ups and his own experiences with Gtech.

== Products ==
- SW02 and SW22 Cordless Carpet Sweepers
- AirRAM, AirRAM K9, AirRAM Platinum and AirRAM 3 Cordless Vacuum Cleaners
- Multi, Multi K9 and Multi Platinum Cordless Handheld Vacuum Cleaners
- Pro 2 and Pro 2 K9 Cordless Bagged Vacuum Cleaner
- HyLite 2 Cordless Lightweight Vacuum Cleaner
- Orca Cordless Wet and Dry Vacuum
- AirFOX Stick Cordless Bagless Vacuum Cleaner
- CLM50 Cordless Lawn Mower and SLM50 Small Cordless Lawn Mower
- GT50 Cordless Grass Trimmer
- HT50 and LHT50 Cordless Hedge Trimmers
- Combi Drill, Impact Driver, Multi Tool, Task Light and Flood Light Cordless Power Tools
- HeatWave Outdoor Heater
- Dirt Monster cordless commercial vacuum

== Media coverage and awards ==
Gtech's cordless vacuum, the AirRAM, has been reviewed in The Daily Telegraph, The Sunday Times, and Which?. In addition, the Good Housekeeping Institute has approved the AirRAM, and the Gtech-designed Bissell Versus cordless vacuum was a winner in its 2009 VIP (Very Innovative Products) Awards.

Gtech won awards for Excellence in Innovation and Business of the Year at the 2013 Herefordshire and Worcestershire Chamber of Commerce Business Awards.

Gtech was awarded the Queen's Award for Innovation in 2015, with the launch of the AirRAM MK2 cordless vacuum.

Gtech's AirRAM Platinum was awarded the T3 Platinum award, and described as "probably the best upright cordless vac ever."

== Sponsorship ==
On 28 July 2022, Grey Technology announced a 10-year partnership with football club Brentford F.C. which included naming rights to their stadium, which immediately became the Gtech Community Stadium.
