= Brentford Community Stadium =

Football stadium in Brentford, London, England

Coordinates: 51°29′27″N 0°17′19″W

Gtech Community Stadium

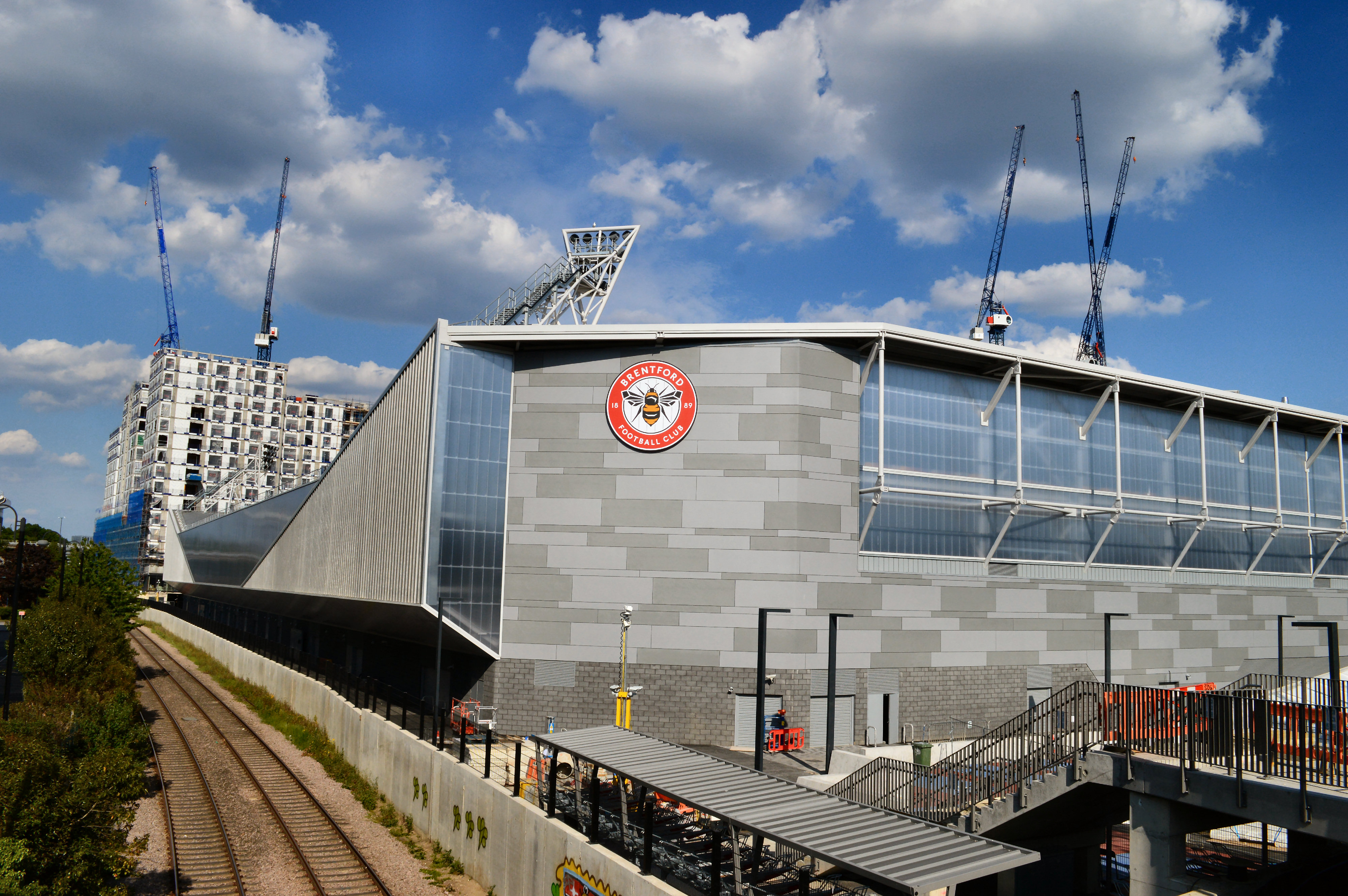
- View from the exterior of the stadium (2020)
- Interactive map of Gtech Community Stadium
- Full name: Gtech Community Stadium
- Address: 166 Lionel Road South
- Location: Brentford; London, England; TW8 0RU
- Owner: Brentford F.C.
- Operator: Brentford
- Capacity: 17,250
- Surface: Desso Grassmaster
- Record attendance: 17,232 (Brentford vs Liverpool, 17 October 2026)
- Field size: 105 x 68 m (association football); 110 x 66m (rugby union)
- Public transit: Kew Bridge

Construction
- Groundbreaking: 25 March 2017
- Built: Spring 2018–Summer 2020
- Opened: 1 September 2020
- Cost: £71 million
- Architect: AFL Architects
- Structural engineer: Arup

Tenants
- Brentford (2020–present); London Irish (2020–2023)

The Brentford Community Stadium, currently known as the Gtech Community Stadium for sponsorship reasons, is a football stadium in Brentford, West London that is the home of Premier League football club Brentford. The stadium has a capacity of 17,250 and is suitable for use for both association football and rugby union matches. Opened in 2020, the stadium is at the heart of plans to regenerate the surrounding area, including new homes and commercial opportunities. It was used during the UEFA Women's Euro 2022 (Euros), which was held in England.

== History ==
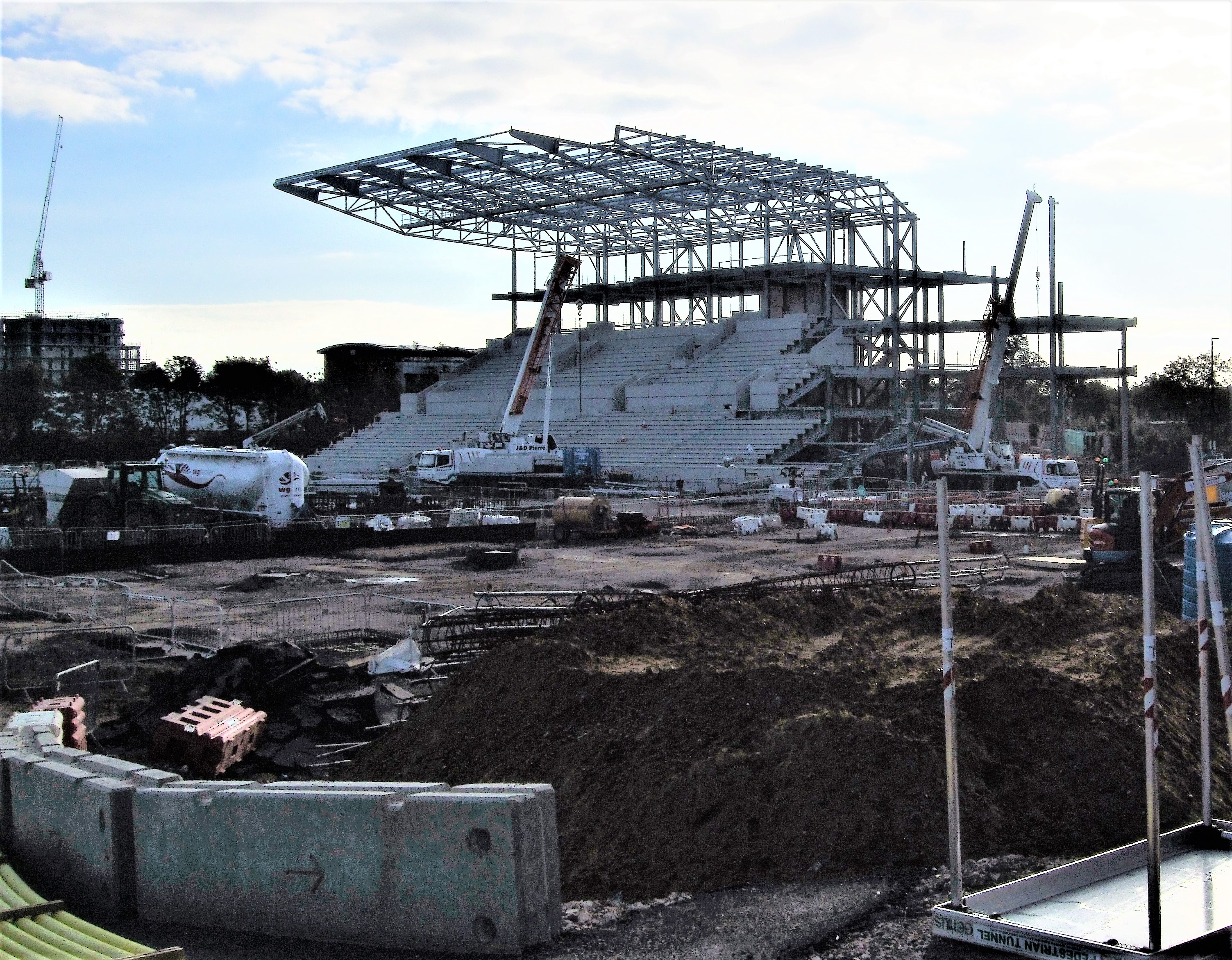
The stadium under construction in September 2018

In October 2002, while still playing at Griffin Park, following several years of speculation about a possible relocation, Brentford announced plans to move to a 20,000-capacity stadium near Kew Bridge. This included an ambitious monorail proposal, which was later dropped from the scheme. After several years of uncertainty, the project was suddenly brought back to public attention in late 2007 when the club announced that it had secured an option on the site.

This was followed up in February 2008 when a partnership deal with Barratt Homes to develop the site was announced.

The club's plan to move to a new community stadium took a massive step forward when, on 28 June 2012, the club bought the 7.6-acre (31,000 m^{2}) site in Lionel Road, Brentford, from Barratt Homes who had originally acquired the site in January 2008. The club aimed to build a 20,000-capacity stadium on the land in time for the 2016–17 season, with the option of extending to 25,000 seats. In December 2013, the club was given approval for the new stadium by Hounslow Council with further approval sought and received from the Mayor of London and the government in December 2013.

Attention then shifted to acquiring the remaining land, required for the enabling development of flats, and completing the development agreement. A Compulsory Purchase Order was approved for the remaining land in the summer of 2014 and although negotiations continued, a number of objections to the CPO resulted in a further hearing in September 2015. The development agreement was signed with Willmott Dixon in December 2014. The CPO was approved in April 2016 and the process completed on 1 September 2016.

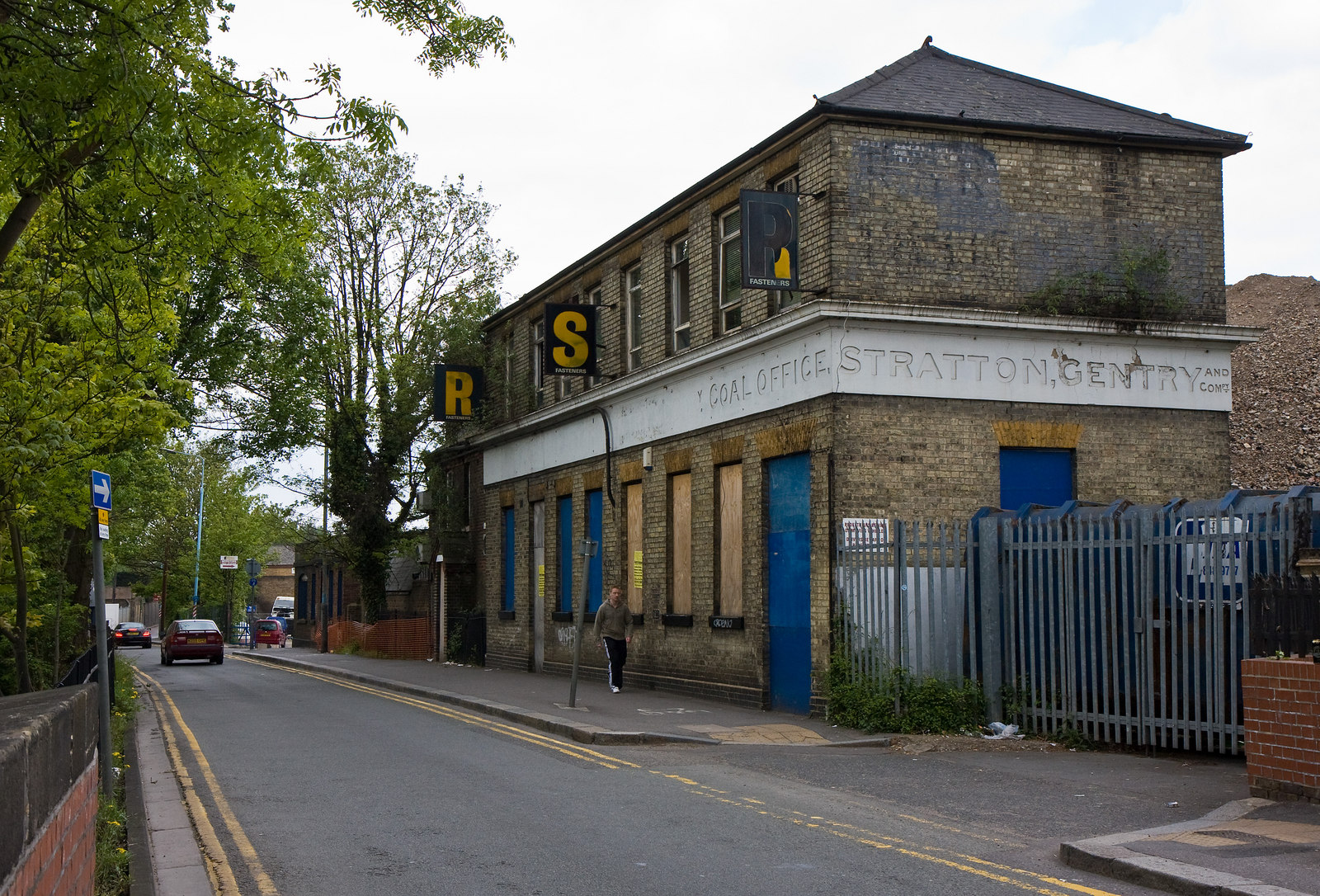
The former Stratton Gentry Coal Works building on Lionel Road South, demolished in 2017 to make way for the stadium.

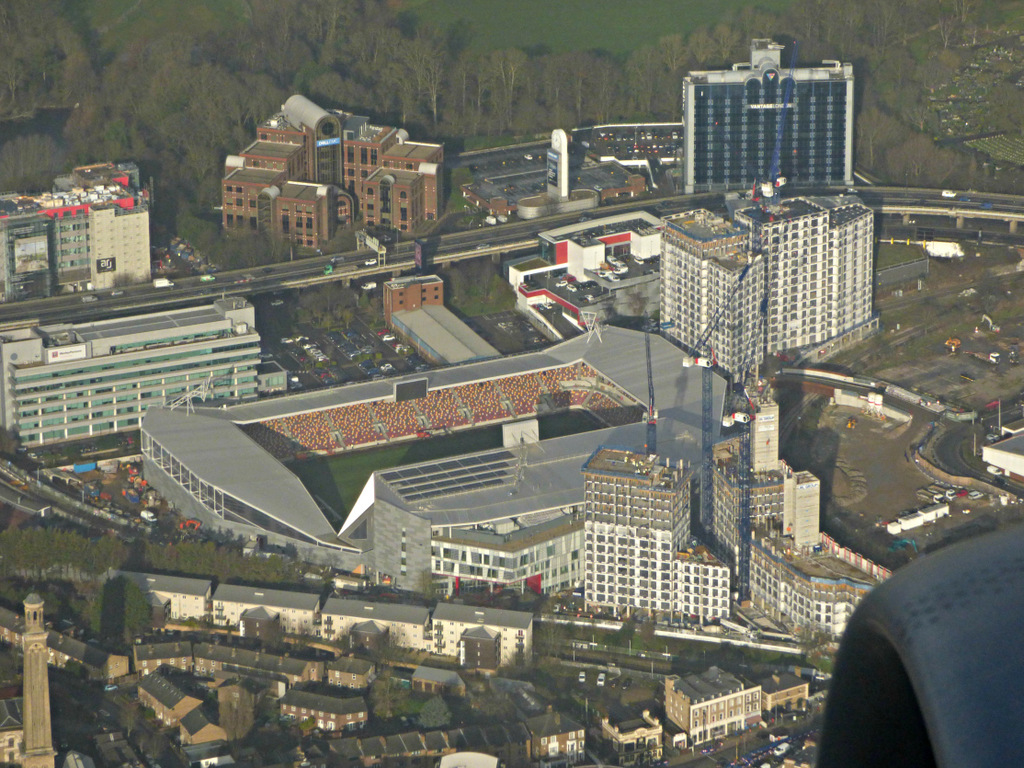
The stadium was built within a railway wye.

Work on the new stadium officially started on 24 March 2017 with site clearance and preliminary works. The main works began in spring 2018. On 30 August 2020, Brentford confirmed that the stadium was complete and ready to host football matches.

During the summer of 2022, the entire West Stand and the north east corner of the stadium were converted to rail-seating to allow safe-standing during matches. This was made possible following a change by the government to allow licensed safe-standing after a successful government-commissioned trial held during the previous season. On 28 July 2022, Brentford announced a ten-year partnership with British technology manufacturer Grey Technology, which included naming rights to the stadium; it immediately became known as the Gtech Community Stadium.

== Footballing history ==
The first football match at the stadium took place on 1 September 2020 when Brentford drew 2–2 against Oxford United in a pre-season friendly. Sergi Canos scored both Brentford goals to give the home side a 2–0 lead before Oxford United staged a late comeback. The first competitive match took place on 6 September when Brentford hosted Wycombe Wanderers in the first round of the EFL Cup. The match finished 1–1 after normal time, with Brentford's Ethan Pinnock opening the scoring. It took a penalty shoot-out to decide the match, which Brentford won 4–2. The first league game to take place at the stadium was a 3–0 win over Huddersfield Town on 19 September, with goals coming from Josh Dasilva, Bryan Mbeumo and Marcus Forss.

=== International football ===
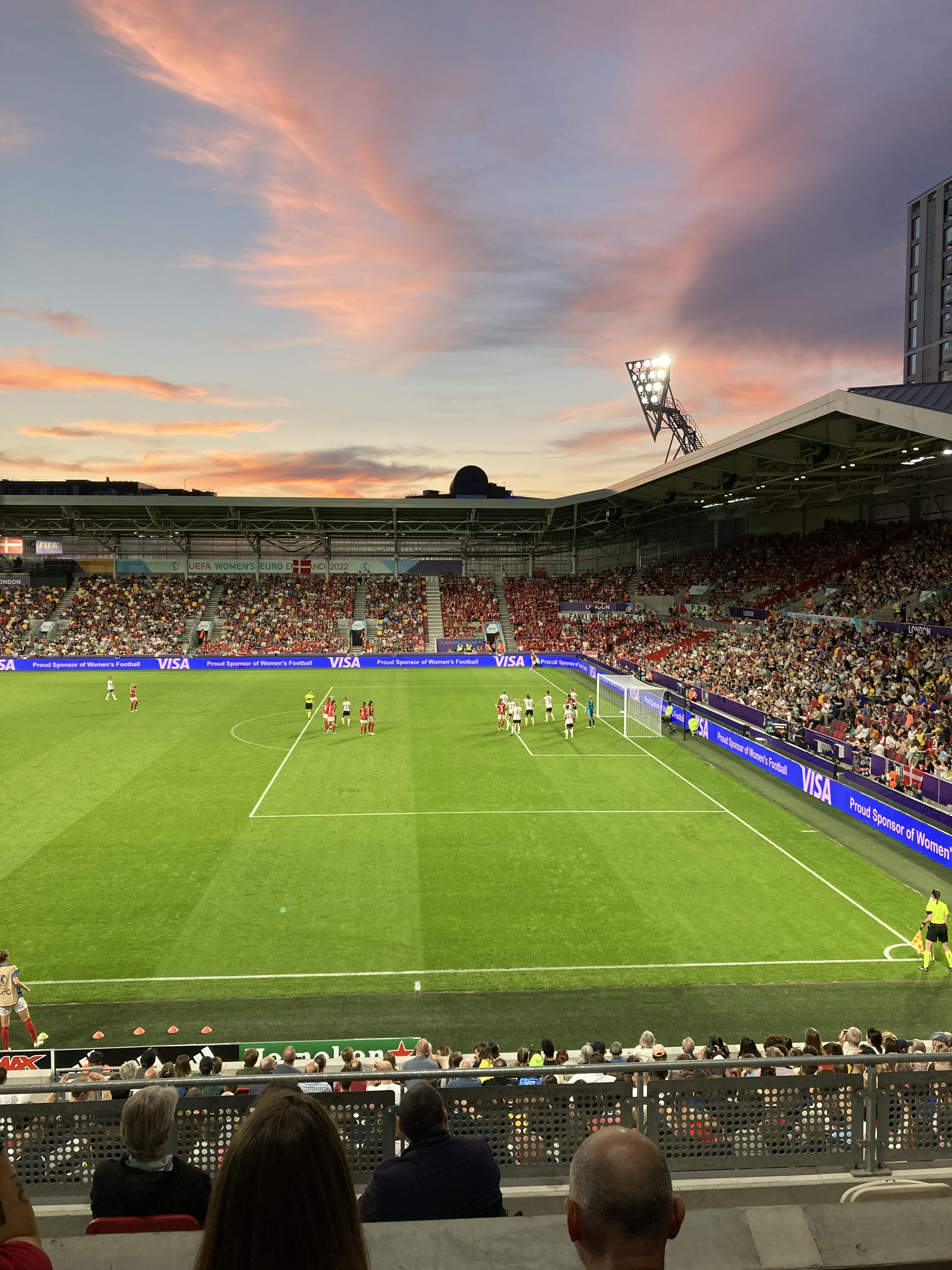
Germany vs Denmark, Women's Euros, 8 July 2022

The stadium was selected as one of several venues for the UEFA Women's Euro 2022 tournament. It hosted Group B fixtures Germany vs Denmark (8 July 2022), Germany vs Spain (12 July 2022) and Denmark vs Spain (16 July 2022) as well as Germany vs Austria in the quarter-final (21 July 2022).

Date	Home	Away	Result	Attendance	Stage
8 July 2022	Germany	Denmark	4–0	15,736	UEFA Women's Euro 2022 Group B
12 July 2022	Germany	Spain	2–0	16,037	UEFA Women's Euro 2022 Group B
16 July 2022	Denmark	Spain	0–1	16,041	UEFA Women's Euro 2022 Group B
21 July 2022	Germany	Austria	2–0	16,025	UEFA Women's Euro 2022 Quarter-final

England hosted Australia in a women's international friendly match (11 April 2023). In 2025, the stadium hosted the Unity Cup, featuring Ghana, Jamaica, Nigeria and Trinidad and Tobago. The cup was won by Nigeria, following a penalty shoot-out. Two Brentford players played in the final representing Nigeria, Benjamin Frederick and Frank Onyeka.

Date	Home	Away	Result	Attendance	Competition
11 April 2023	England	Australia	0–2	14,489	Friendly (Women)
17 October 2023	Australia	New Zealand	2–0	5,761	Friendly (Men)
27 May 2025	Jamaica	Trinidad and Tobago	3–2	Unknown	Unity Cup Semi-final
28 May 2025	Nigeria	Ghana	2–1	Unknown	Unity Cup Semi-final
31 May 2025	Trinidad and Tobago	Ghana	0–4	Unknown	Unity Cup Third place play-off
31 May 2025	Jamaica	Nigeria	2–2 (4–5)	Unknown	Unity Cup Final

== Rugby union ==
On 15 August 2016, rugby union club London Irish announced that discussions were ongoing with the borough for a move to the new stadium as tenants of Brentford. Irish played in Reading, Berkshire, but were hoping to move back to the capital. An amended application to use the stadium for rugby in addition to its main purpose of hosting football was passed on 9 February 2017, effectively allowing London Irish to play at the stadium. The move to Brentford from its opening season was later confirmed.

London Irish played their inaugural match at the stadium on 29 November 2020, when they beat Leicester Tigers 22–9. The first try was scored by Curtis Rona of London Irish. London Irish were suspended from the league ahead of the 2023–24 Premiership Rugby season and subsequently entered administration, meaning that their future remains uncertain.

== Location ==
The stadium is located on a 7.6 acres (31,000 m^{2}) site off Lionel Road, adjacent to Kew Bridge railway station. It stands in the middle of a triangle of railway lines, some used for freight. There are proposals to re-open a passenger rail route from Willesden and Brent Cross through to Hounslow via a station at Lionel Road using one of these freight lines (the 'West London Orbital' scheme). Outline planning documents suggest a station could be built to serve the stadium on the Lionel Road site. The nearest station on the Transport for London network is Gunnersbury, served by the London Underground District line and the recently named Mildmay Line on the London Overground (Stratford to Richmond route). Kew Bridge railway station is adjacent to the stadium.
