= Waterloo Bridge, Betws-y-Coed =

Bridge across the River Conwy, Wales

Waterloo Bridge
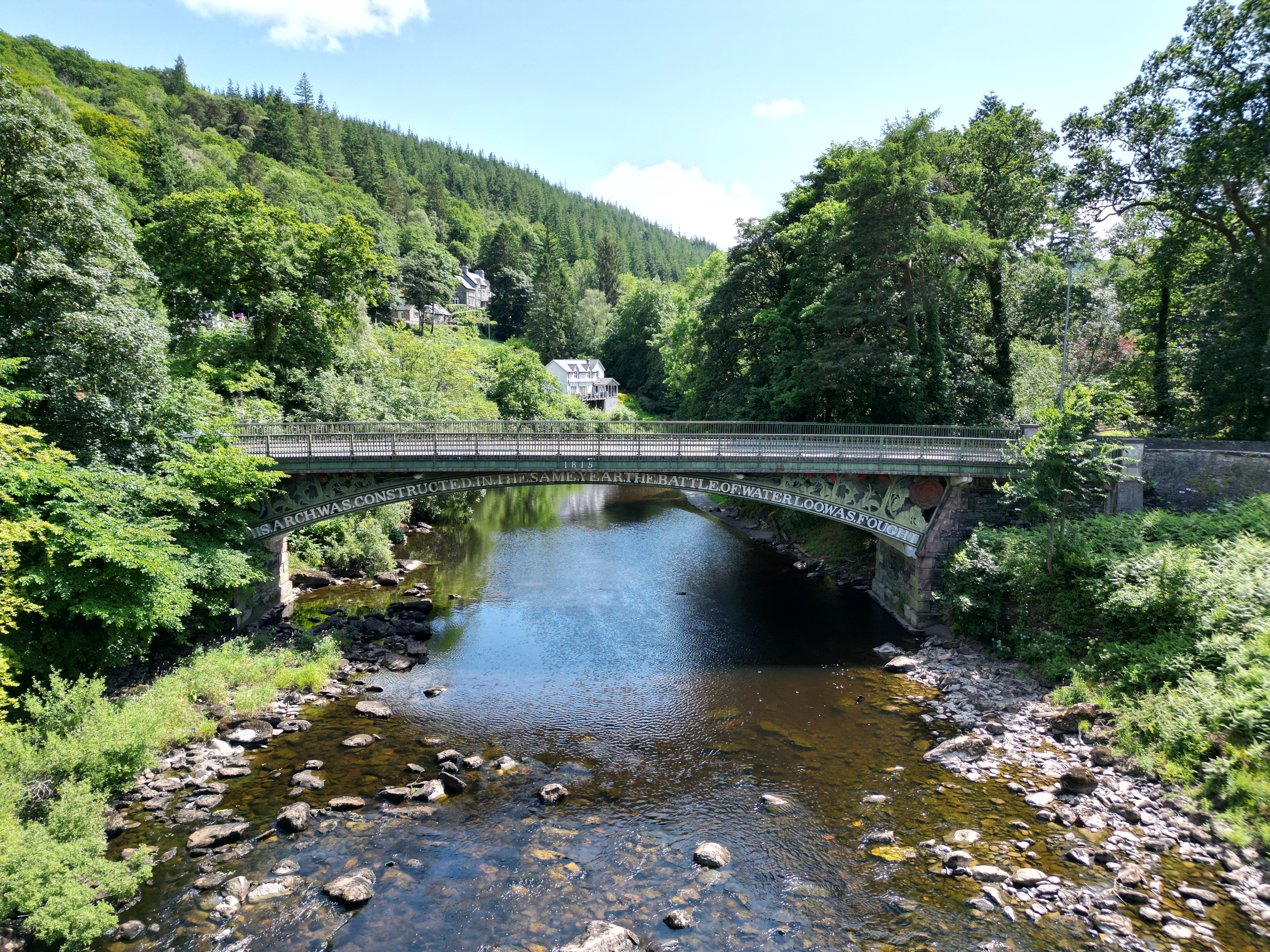
- Coordinates: 53.0852°N 3.7953°W
- Carries: Motor vehicles (2 lanes); Pedestrians
- Crosses: River Conwy
- Locale: Betws-y-Coed

Characteristics
- Design: Arch bridge
- Material: Cast iron
- Longest span: 32 metres (105 ft)
- No. of spans: 1

History
- Designer: Thomas Telford
- Construction end: 1815

Location
- Interactive map of Waterloo Bridge

Waterloo Bridge (Welsh: Pont Waterloo) is an early cast iron bridge, spanning the River Conwy at Betws-y-Coed, in Conwy County Borough, north-west Wales.

== Background ==
Following the Acts of Union 1800, which united Great Britain (England, Wales and Scotland) with Ireland, communications with the sea port at Holyhead—about 40 miles (64 kilometres) west of Betws-y-Coed—drastically increased in importance. The civil engineer Thomas Telford was commissioned to improve the London to Holyhead coaching road to allow faster journey for the mail coaches which, at the turn of the 19th century, could take 46 hours to reach the port from London. The route through northern Wales was particularly poor and required extensive engineering works. It crossed the River Conwy at Betws-y-Coed. This section was the first to be improved, and work began in 1815. Waterloo Bridge is one of six cast-iron arches designed by Telford; the only one to survive with no modification is the Galton Bridge near Birmingham. Bonar Bridge in the Scottish Highlands was destroyed; like Waterloo Bridge, the others (Mythe Bridge in Gloucestershire, Holt Fleet Bridge in Worcestershire, and Craigellachie Bridge in Scotland) remain but have all been strengthened with modern materials. Waterloo Bridge is possibly the seventh major cast-iron arch bridge in the world.

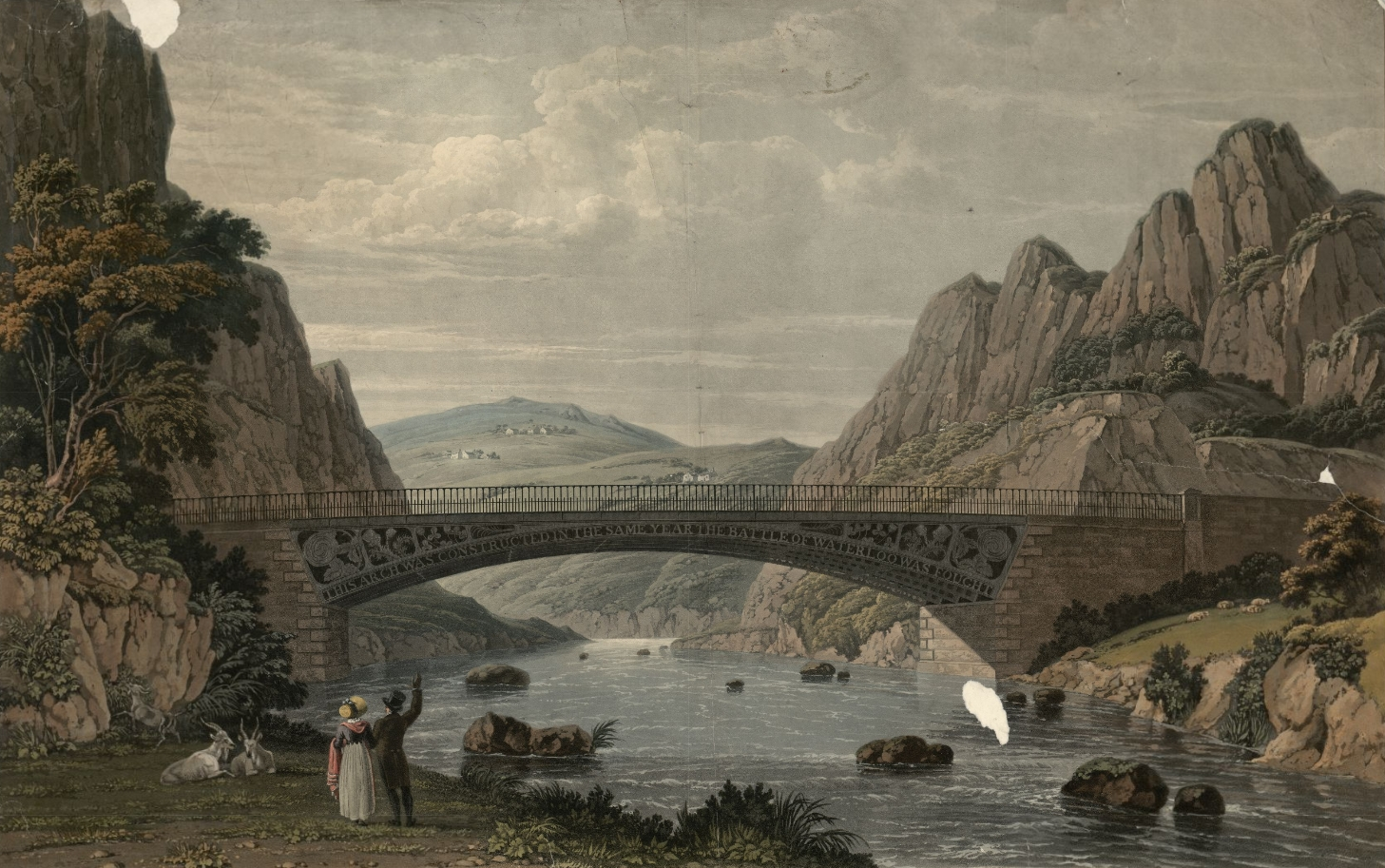
A view of the Waterloo Bridge c.1815

== Description ==
The bride was originally entirely in cast iron, supported by stone abutments on the riverbanks. It has a single span of 105 feet (32 metres), which is made up of five segments (or ribs) at five-foot (1.5-metre) intervals. The ribs support the deck plate, which was also cast iron. In the spandrels (the space between the top of the arch and the bridge deck) are cast a rose, shamrock, thistle, and leek, the national symbols of England, Ireland, Scotland, and Wales. The symbols are partly polychromed. On the outer ribs of the arch in cast lettering is an inscription commemorating the Battle of Waterloo, which ended the Napoleonic Wars and resulted in a wave of patriotism in Britain: "this arch was constructed in the same year the Battle of Waterloo was fought". The date 1815 also appears above, though the bridge did not open until the following year. Telford's name and those of the iron founder and works foreman appear in raised lettering on the outside of the bridge deck.

== Later history ==
Restoration work was carried out in 1923. The abutments were refurbished and strengthened, and the inner three ribs of the arch were encased in concrete to provide reinforcement. The cast-iron bridge deck was supplemented with a seven-inch (180-millimetre) deep reinforced concrete deck, which was cantilevered over the sides to allow for the road to be widened. The cantilevered parts now carry footpaths. Further remedial work was carried out in 1978 which included replacing the reinforced concrete deck. The cast iron parapet railings were re-erected on the outsides of the footpaths but protected with additional railings.

In May 1996, the bridge was designated a Grade I listed building, a status which affords it legal protection. Its list entry calls it "a highly important and imaginatively-designed iron road bridge by Thomas Telford, engineer, a significant example of early iron technology".

== See also ==
- List of bridges in Wales
