= Galton Bridge =

Cast-iron bridge in West Midlands, England

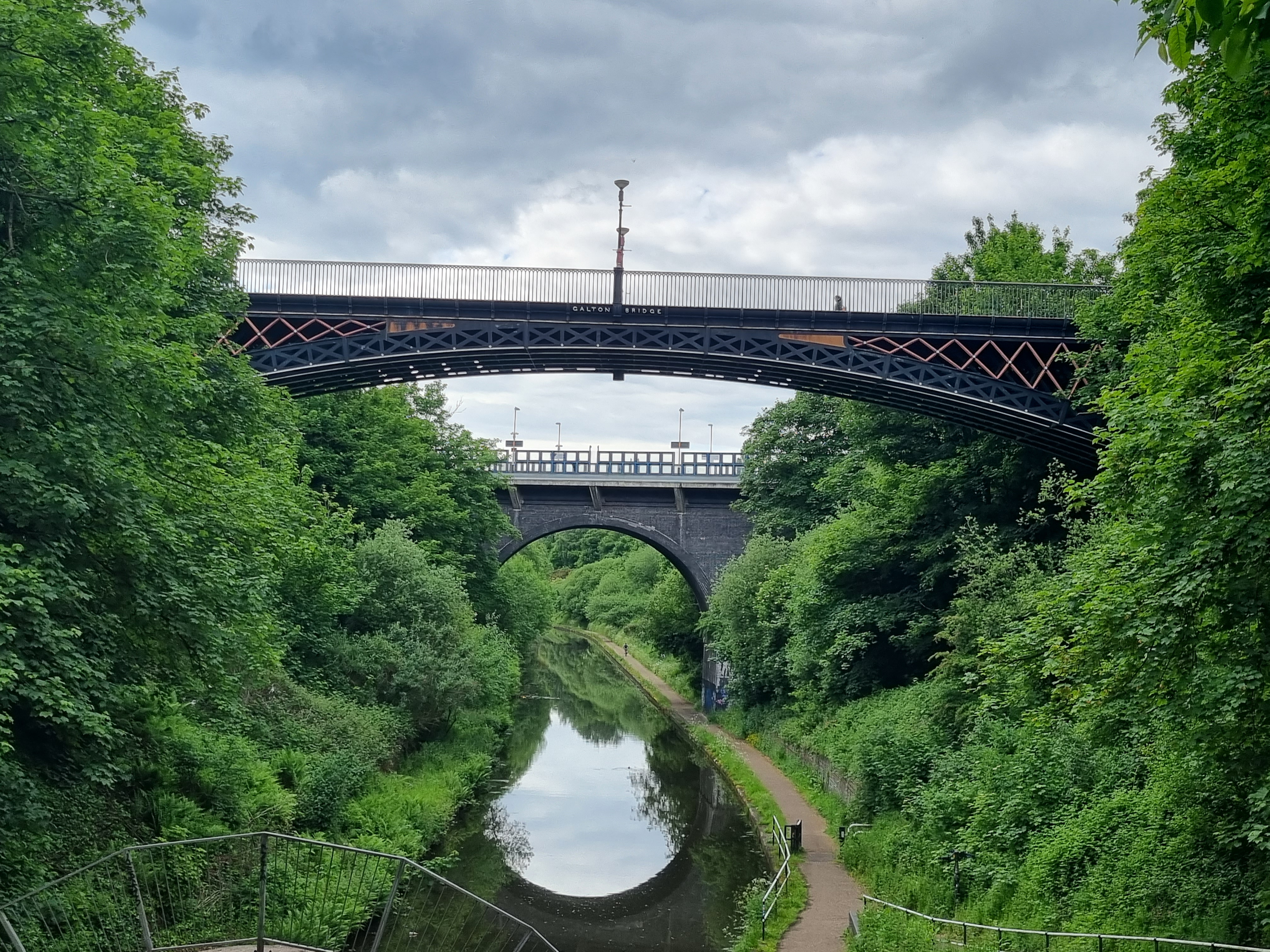
- The Galton Bridge (foreground) from the west
- Coordinates: 52.5019°N 1.9794°W
- Carries: Roebuck Lane
- Crosses: Birmingham Canal New Main Line
- Locale: Smethwick, West Midlands, England
- Maintained by: Canal and River Trust
- Heritage status: Grade I listed building

Characteristics
- Material: Cast iron
- Total length: 150 ft (46 m)
- Width: 26 ft (7.9 m)
- Height: 70 ft (21 m)
- No. of spans: 1

History
- Constructed by: Thomas Telford
- Opened: 1829

Location
- Interactive map of Galton Bridge

The Galton Bridge is a cast-iron bridge in Smethwick, Sandwell, in the West Midlands of England. Opened in 1829 as a road bridge, the structure has been pedestrianised since the 1970s. It was built by Thomas Telford to carry a road across the new main line of the Birmingham Canal, which was built in a deep cutting. The bridge is 70 feet (21 metres) above the canal, making it reputedly the highest single-span arch bridge in the world when it was built, 26 feet (7.9 metres) wide, and 150 feet (46 metres) long. The iron components were fabricated at the nearby Horseley Ironworks and assembled atop the masonry abutments. The design includes decorative lamp-posts and X-shaped bracing in the spandrels.

In the 1840s, a railway bridge was built from one of the abutments, with a parapet in keeping with the original. The Galton Bridge carried traffic for over 140 years until it was bypassed by a new road, named Telford Way, in the 1970s, and now carries only pedestrians and cyclists. The bridge is one of six built by Telford that share common design features and the only one still standing without modification. It underwent minor repair work in the 1980s, after which it was repainted from its original black into a colour scheme intended to enhance its features. It is maintained by the Canal and River Trust and lends its name to the nearby Smethwick Galton Bridge railway station. It is a Grade I listed building.

== Background ==
The original Birmingham Canal was built from the late 1760s along a meandering route, connecting Birmingham to Wolverhampton via the Black Country coalfields in the modern-day West Midlands. One of the major obstacles on the route was a patch of high ground at Smethwick, roughly 4 miles (6.4 kilometres) north-west of Birmingham. The engineers had originally planned to tunnel through, but discovered that the ground conditions were not suitable. Thus, the canal was carried over the hill by a flight of locks.

By the 1820s canal traffic had grown enormously and its narrowness was causing congestion. The summit at Smethwick was short and bordered by locks at each end; as a result, it was common for long queues of boats to form at either end and fights often broke out among boat crews. Improvements had been mooted for years, though the immediate catalyst for investment was a proposal for a railway connecting Birmingham to Liverpool via Wolverhampton. The canal proprietors consulted Thomas Telford, the most eminent canal engineer of the day, and he designed a new, straighter route (known as the New Main Line, the original canal becoming the Old Main Line) which significantly reduced the length of the canal. This scheme involved the excavation of an artificial valley through the high ground in Smethwick. The bridge was named after Samuel Tertius Galton, a local businessman and major investor in the Birmingham Canal Company.

Three local roads were severed by the work, two of which were replaced with traditional masonry bridges, but Roebuck Lane was to cross the cutting at its widest and deepest point. Like all the bridges on the new route, it needed to span the canal without obstructing the waterway or the towpaths. Hence, Telford considered a lighter structure was necessary. Telford was a pioneer in the use of cast iron and became famed for his bridges and aqueducts using the material, which he discovered could be used to create wider spans than had previously been possible using brick or stone. Cast iron is brittle under tension but strong under compression; in bridge construction, it tended to be used in arch form. The world's first iron bridge opened in Shropshire fifty years before the Galton Bridge. Engineers including Telford spent the rest of the 18th century and much of the 19th refining the construction methods.

== Design ==
The bridge is a single span of 150 ft (46 m), 26 ft (8 m) wide and 70 ft (20 m) above the canal. It consists of six cast-iron ribs, each made of seven segments, bolted together. The bridge is supported by tall brick abutments built into the valley sides. The deck plate is supported by X-shaped bracing in the spandrels. Telford added a decorative parapet and lamp-posts, also in cast iron. When built, it was believed to be the longest bridge over a canal and the highest single-span arch bridge in the world; Telford wrote in his memoirs "At the place of greatest excavation is erected the largest canal bridge in the world; it is made of iron." All the ironwork was cast by Horseley Ironworks at its canal-side factory in nearby Tipton. The name "Galton Bridge" is cast into the centre of the structure, below the parapet, on both sides and "Horseley Iron Works 1829" is cast below both spandrels on both sides.

In his memoirs, published posthumously, Telford described the Galton Bridge as an "extraordinary span". He explained that his decision to build such a high bridge and to build it in cast iron, then still a novel material, was one of "safety, combined with economy". A masonry bridge tall enough to reach the top of the banks of the cutting would require substantial abutments which risked the stonework becoming waterlogged and bulging during heavy rain, whereas an iron span was lighter and required smaller abutments. Telford wrote that "the proportion of masonry is small, and produces variety by its appearance of lightness, which agreeably strikes every spectator."

The Galton Bridge is the last of a series of six cast-iron arch bridges built by Telford to a similar design. The first was at Bonar Bridge in the Scottish Highlands, built in 1810, which became the prototype. Others include the Mythe Bridge at Tewkesbury, built three years before the Galton Bridge, and the Holt Fleet Bridge in Worcestershire, completed in 1828. The Galton Bridge is the only one of the six surviving without later modification; Bonar Bridge was washed away in a flood and Mythe and Holt Fleet bridges were both strengthened with modern materials in the 20th century. The others are Craigellachie Bridge (1814) in north-eastern Scotland, and Waterloo Bridge (1816) in Betws-y-Coed, North Wales, both also strengthened in the 20th century.

The Galton Bridge originally held commanding views of the valley on either side, but these are now obstructed. The bridge is hemmed in between the Smethwick Station Bridge, a railway bridge built in the 1860s, on the west (Wolverhampton) side, and a partial infill of the cutting where a 1970s road scheme crosses the canal on the east (Birmingham) side.

== History ==
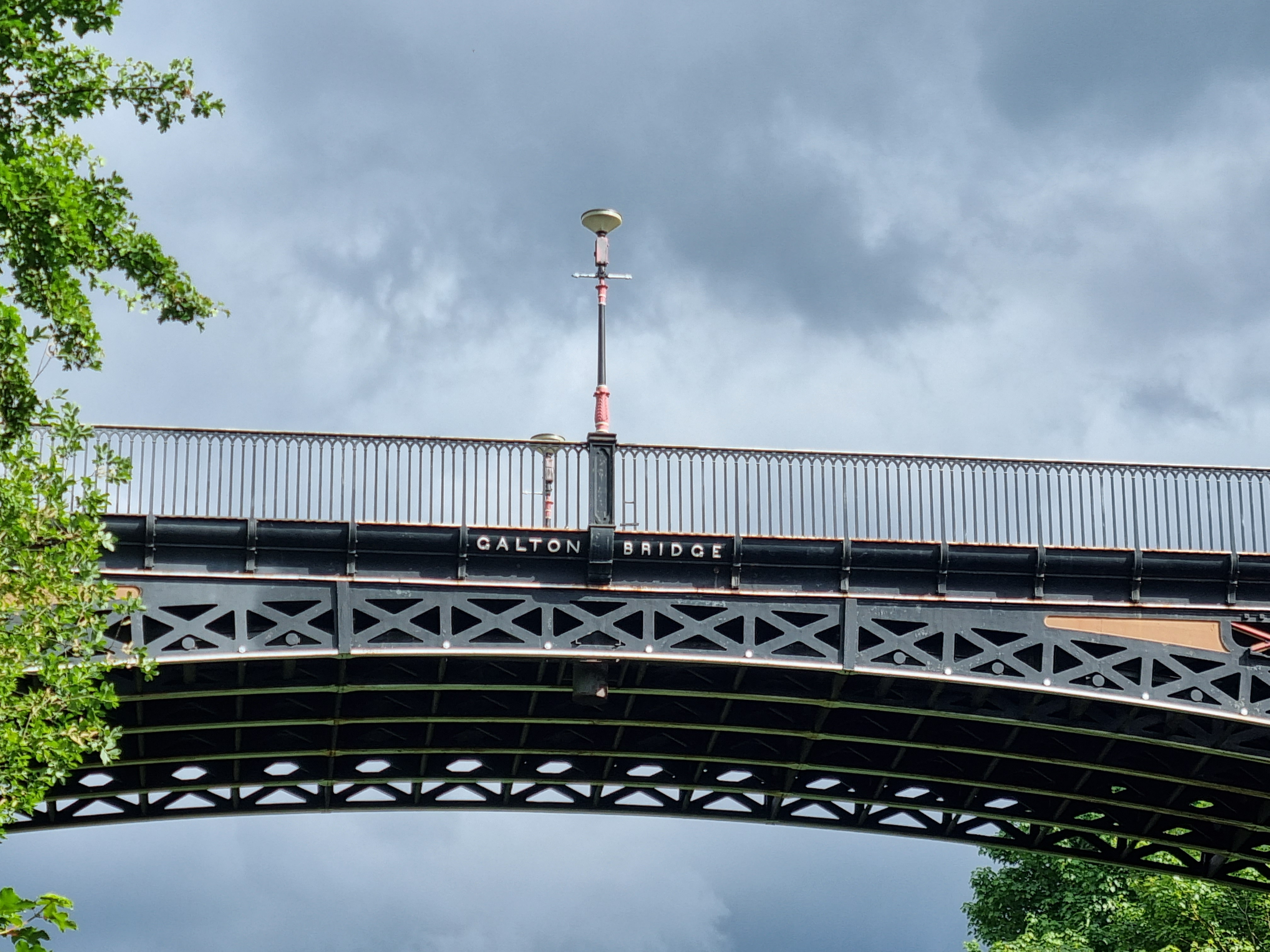
The centre of the bridge, showing one of the lamp-posts and the name cast into the metalwork

Construction work on the cutting began in 1827. It and the bridge opened in December 1829. Isambard Kingdom Brunel, then a young engineer, visited it the following year and described it as "prodigious". In the 1840s to 1850s, the Stour Valley Railway built its Wolverhampton–Birmingham line along a route mostly parallel to the new main line canal. The railway company built an adjacent bridge to take its tracks under the road using one of the abutments from the canal bridge. The span is a masonry arch but the railway company built an iron parapet in keeping with the Galton Bridge.

The bridge carried increasingly heavy vehicles for almost 150 years until the 1970s, when Roebuck Lane (the road which crosses the Galton Bridge and the adjacent Summit Bridge) was bypassed by a road improvement scheme. A much wider road (the A4252) was built and the Galton Bridge was closed to vehicles but continues to carry pedestrians and cyclists. Instead of constructing a new bridge, the 1970s engineers partly filled in the cutting and built a concrete tunnel for the canal, which was reduced in width. The new road, which runs parallel to the Galton Bridge, was named Telford Way and the canal tunnel named Galton Tunnel. The area around the bridge is sometimes known as the Galton Valley. The structure lends its name to the nearby Smethwick Galton Bridge railway station.

The bridge underwent minor structural repair work in 1987 and was repainted in colour to enhance its features; before this, it had always been painted black. An inspection using ropes to access the underside in the 2000s established that the bridge was in excellent condition and that the 1980s paint work had survived well. The bridge is the responsibility of the Canal and River Trust (formerly British Waterways). It has been a Grade I listed building, the highest of three grades, since 1971. Listed building status provides legal protection from demolition or modification. The list entry explicitly includes the attached span across the railway.

== See also ==
- Engine Arm Aqueduct, another Telford cast-iron structure on the same canal
- Grade I listed buildings in the West Midlands
- List of bridges in the United Kingdom
