= William Hazledine =

English ironmaster (1763–1840)

- Born: Shawbury, Shropshire, England
- Died: Shrewsbury, Shropshire, England
- Spouse: Miss Brayne
- Engineering career
- Discipline: Ironmaster; Structural engineer
- Projects: Chirk Aqueduct; Menai Bridge

William Hazledine (1763 – 26 October 1840) was an English ironmaster. Establishing large foundries, he was a pioneer in casting structural ironwork, most notably for canal aqueducts and early suspension bridges. Many of these projects were collaborations with Thomas Telford, including the Pontcysyllte Aqueduct and the Menai Suspension Bridge.

Telford called him "the Arch conjuror himself, Merlin Hazledine".

== Early life and career ==
Hazledine was born in Shawbury in 1763, one of several children of William Hazledine, a millwright; when he was young the family moved to Sowbatch, near Moreton Corbet. He and his brother John were trained as millwrights by their uncle. (Later, John and younger brothers Robert and Thomas set up an ironworks in Bridgnorth, Shropshire).

About 1780 William supervised the erection of machinery at Upton Forge near Shrewsbury. (Several years later he leased the forge; it became an important source of wrought iron for later projects.) He moved to Shrewsbury, and about 1787 entered into partnership with Robert Webster, a clockmaker and inventor. They set up a foundry in Cole Hall, near the Welsh Bridge in Shrewsbury. In 1789 he joined the Freemasons; he met there a fellow member, Thomas Telford. Hazledine's earliest recorded ironwork was in 1792 for St Chad's Church, Shrewsbury, built by John Simpson, a friend of Hazledine and associate of Telford: cast iron columns were made to support the upper gallery of the church.

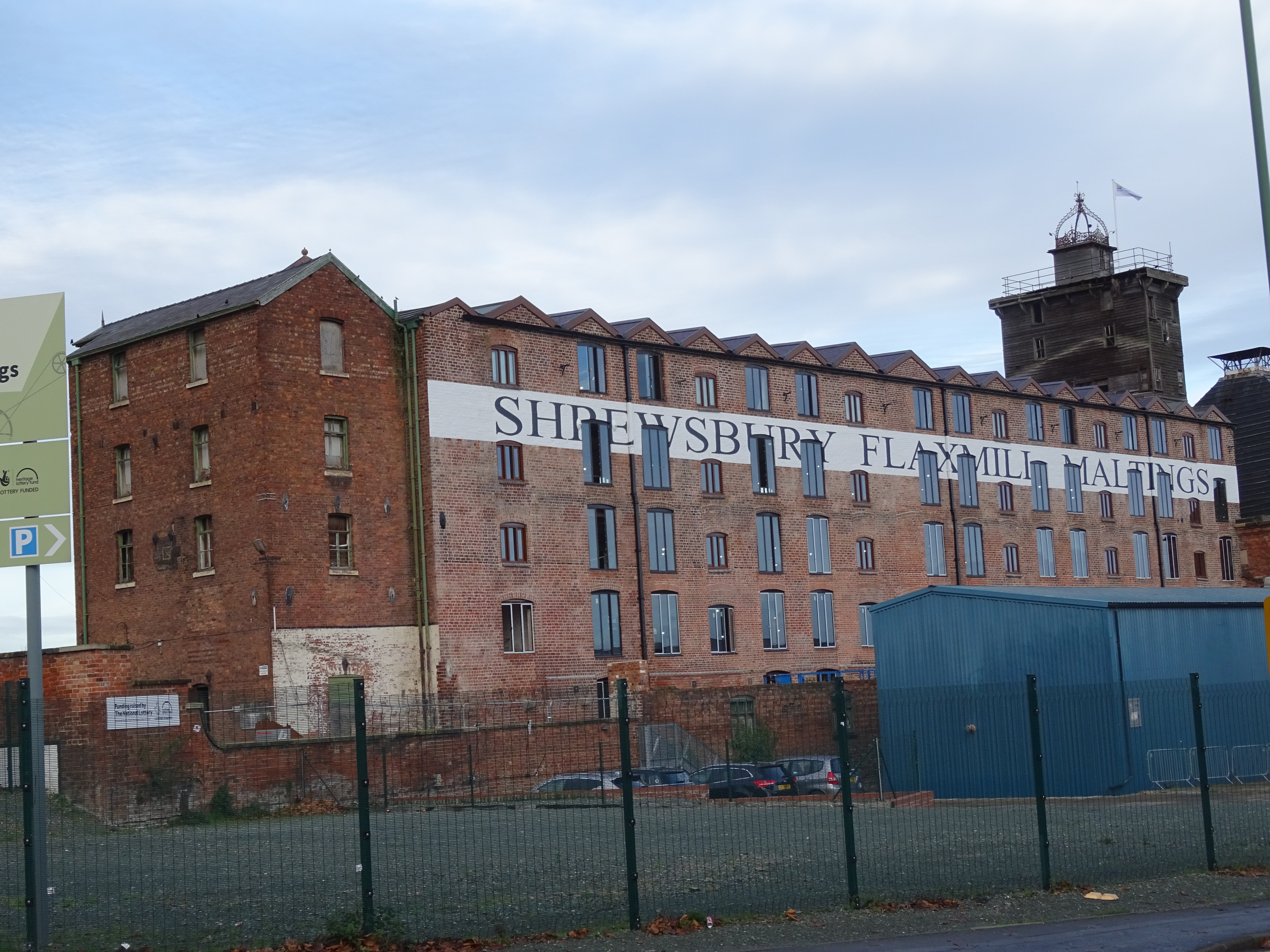
Shrewsbury Flaxmill-Maltings ironwork supplied by Hazledine

The partnership with Webster was dissolved, and in 1793 he purchased land at Coleham in Shrewsbury, where he set up a larger foundry with steam-powered equipment. The foundry eventually employed nearly 500 workers. In 1796 he cast the frame for the Ditherington Flax Mill designed by Charles Bage. It was the world's first iron-framed building.

== Projects with Thomas Telford ==
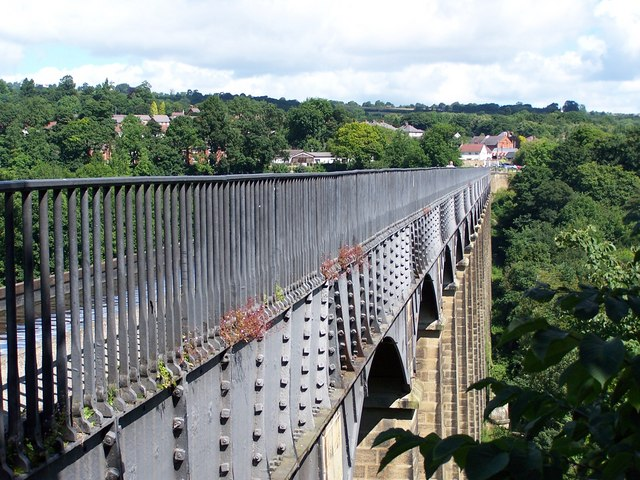
Pontcysyllte Aqueduct (1805), designed by Telford, ironwork supplied by Hazledine

In the following years Hazledine supplied ironwork for many projects of Thomas Telford.

He made the iron deck for the Chirk Aqueduct, completed in 1802. He built a large foundry at Plas Kynaston, Cefn Mawr, where he made the iron deck for the nearby Pontcysyllte Aqueduct, completed in 1805.

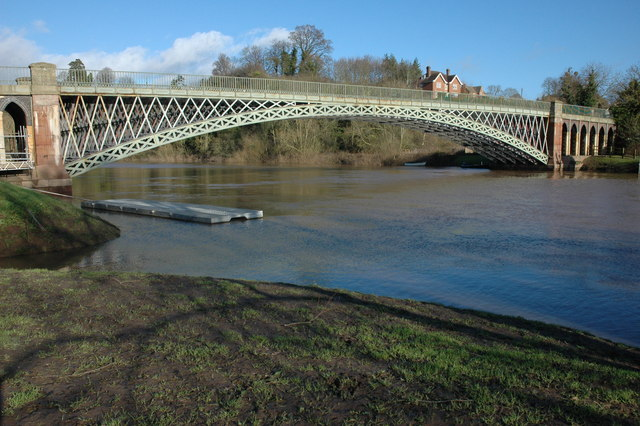
Mythe Bridge, Tewkesbury (1826), designed by Telford, ironwork supplied by Hazledine

The Bonar Bridge in Scotland, an innovative design by Telford with a central span of 150 feet (46 m), was built in 1811–12; The ironwork was cast at Plas Kynaston, and Hazledine supervised its erection. There were several more bridges of this design, including the Mythe Bridge, with a span of 170 feet (52 m), at Tewkesbury (1823–26).

From about 1815 to 1820 he supplied and fitted lock gates for the western half of Telford's Caledonian Canal.

In 1821 Hazledine contracted to supply the wrought iron and cast iron for the Menai Suspension Bridge. The bridge, designed by Telford, was completed in 1826. He also supplied the ironwork for Telford's Conwy Suspension Bridge, completed the same year. The tensile strength of the wrought iron chains, made at Upton Forge, was important to these suspension bridges.

== Other business interests, and later years ==
In 1817 he took over Calcutts Ironworks, in Ironbridge Gorge; pig iron was produced, and wrought and cast iron made. It was not successful, and he gave up the lease in 1831. Other business interests included a limeworks at Llanymynech, property in Shrewsbury, and timber-yards and brickyards.

He was mayor of Shrewsbury from 1835 to 1836.

Hazledine died in 1840 at his home, Newport House, in Dogpole, Shrewsbury, and was buried at St Chad's Church. There is a memorial, with a bust of Hazledine by James Heffernan whilst working under Francis Leggatt Chantrey, in the church. Note - Gunnis states the monument is by local sculptor John Carline which is more likely.

== Structures ==
Hazledine's legacy is a range of spectacular structures including:

- Ditherington Flax Mill, Shrewsbury, England (1797)
- Pontcysyllte Aqueduct, Froncysyllte, Wales (1795-1805)
- Chirk Aqueduct, Chirk, Wales (1799)
- Craigellachie Bridge, Scotland (1812–1814)
- Menai Suspension Bridge, Wales (1819–1826)
- Mythe Bridge, Tewkesbury, England (1823–1826)
- Aldford Iron Bridge, Eaton Hall, Cheshire, England (1824)
- Conwy Suspension Bridge, Wales (1824–1826)
- Cleveland Bridge, Bath, Somerset, England (1826)
- Stretton Aqueduct, Staffordshire, England (1832–3)

== Namesakes ==
In Coleham, "Hazeldine (sic) Crescent" and "Hazledine Court" were named for him, as were "Hazledine Way", part of Shrewsbury's later 20th century inner ring road, linking Reabrook housing estate to Meole Brace.
