= Thomas Telford =

Scottish civil engineer (1757–1834)

Thomas Telford FRS FRSE
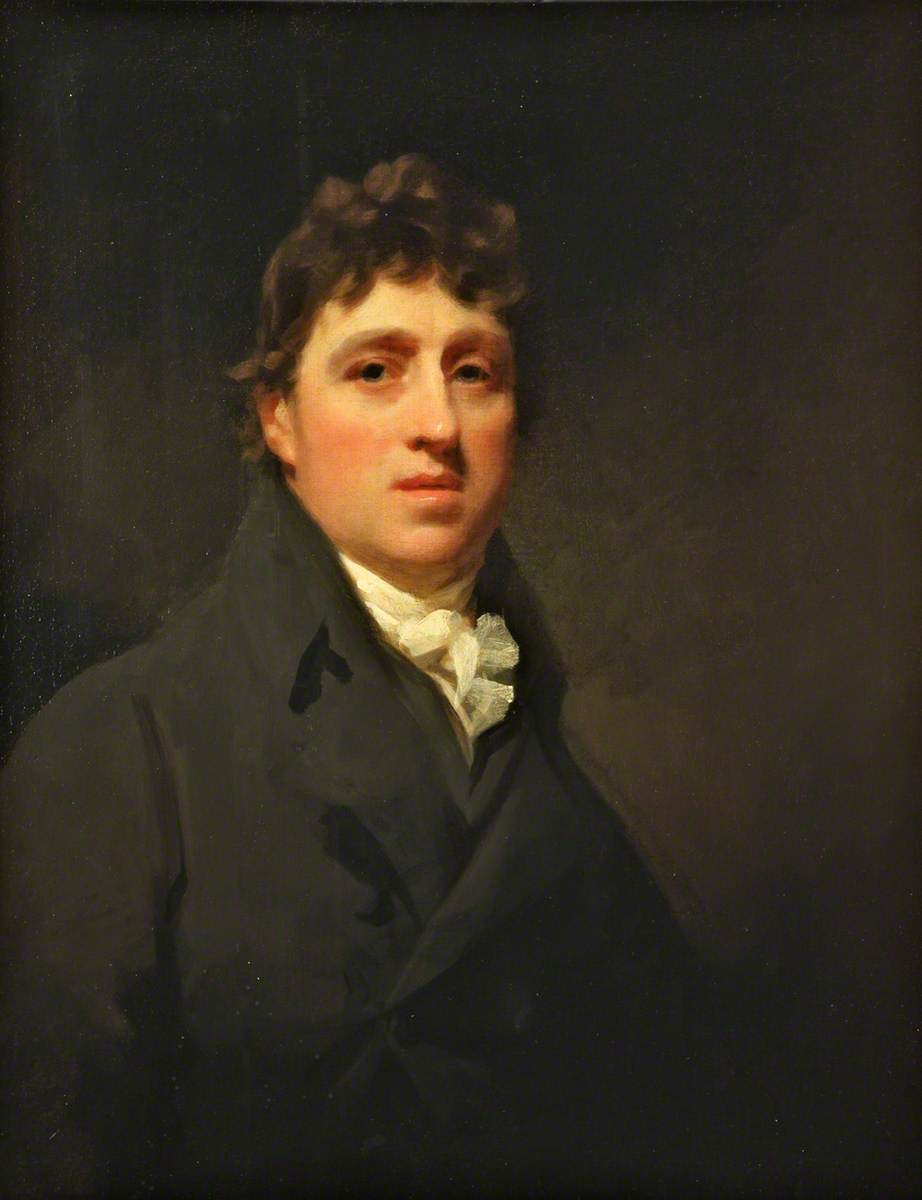
- c. 1803 portrait of Telford by Henry Raeburn
- Born: 9 August 1757; Glendinning, Westerkirk, Eskdale, Dumfriesshire, Scotland
- Died: 2 September 1834 (aged 77); Westminster, London, England
- Engineering career
- Discipline: Civil
- Institutions: Founder and first President of the Institution of Civil Engineers (1818)
- Projects: Caledonian Canal; Göta Canal; Ellesmere Canal; Pontcysyllte Aqueduct; Shrewsbury Canal; Menai suspension bridge; A5 road

Signature
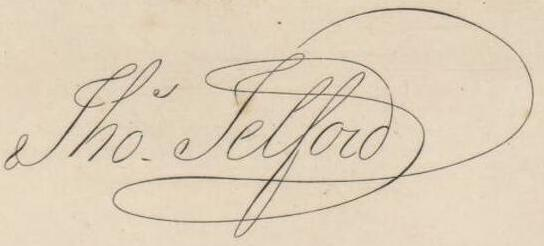

Thomas Telford (9 August 1757 – 2 September 1834) was a Scottish civil engineer. After establishing himself as an engineer of road and canal projects in Shropshire, he designed numerous infrastructure projects in his native Scotland, as well as harbours and tunnels. Such was his reputation as a prolific designer of highways and related bridges, he was dubbed the 'Colossus of Roads' (a pun on the Colossus of Rhodes), and, reflecting his command of all types of civil engineering in the early 19th century, he was elected as the first president of the Institution of Civil Engineers, a post he held for 14 years until his death. The town of Telford in Shropshire was named after him.

== Early career ==
Telford was born on 9 August 1757, at Glendinning, a hill farm three miles (five kilometres) east of Eskdalemuir Kirk, in the rural parish of Westerkirk, in Eskdale, Dumfriesshire. His father John Telford, a shepherd, died soon after Thomas was born. Thomas was raised in poverty by his mother Janet Jackson (died 1794).

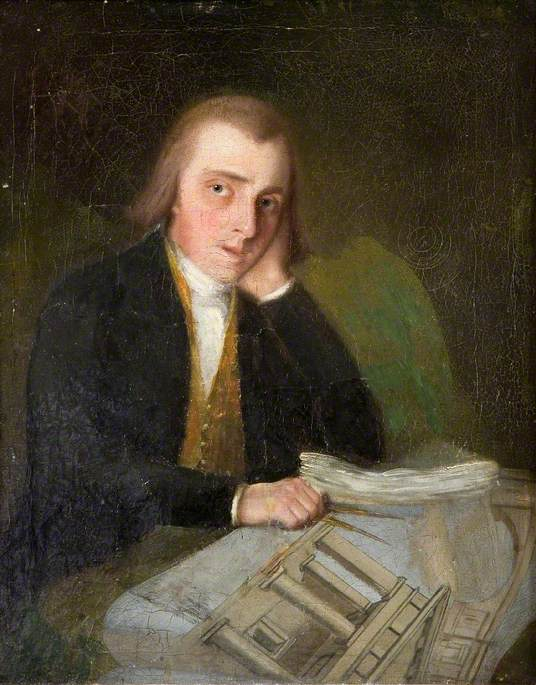
1792 portrait of Telford

At the age of 14, he was apprenticed to a stonemason, and some of his earliest work can still be seen on the bridge across the River Esk in Langholm in Dumfries and Galloway. He worked for a time in Edinburgh and in 1782 he moved to London where, after meeting architects Robert Adam and Sir William Chambers, he was involved in building additions to Somerset House there. Two years later he found work at Portsmouth dockyard and – although still largely self-taught – was extending his talents to the specification, design and management of building projects.

In 1787, through his wealthy patron William Pulteney, he became Surveyor of Public Works in Shropshire. His projects included renovation of Shrewsbury Castle, the town's prison (during the planning of which he met leading prison reformer John Howard), the Church of St Mary Magdalene, Bridgnorth and another church, St Michael's, in Madeley. Called in to advise on a leaking roof at St Chad's Church, Shrewsbury in 1788, he warned the church was in imminent danger of collapse; his reputation was made locally when it collapsed three days later, but he was not the architect for its replacement.

As the Shropshire county surveyor, Telford was also responsible for bridges. In 1790 he designed Montford Bridge carrying the London–Holyhead road over the River Severn at Montford, the first of some 40 bridges he built in Shropshire, including major crossings of the Severn at Buildwas, and Bridgnorth. The bridge at Buildwas was Telford's first iron bridge. He was influenced by Abraham Darby's bridge at Ironbridge, and observed that it was grossly over-designed for its function, and many of the component parts were poorly cast. By contrast, his bridge was 30 ft (9 m) wider in span and half the weight, although it now no longer exists. He was one of the first engineers to test his materials thoroughly before construction. As his engineering prowess grew, Telford was to return to this material repeatedly.

In 1795, the bridge at Bewdley in Worcestershire was swept away in the winter floods and Telford was responsible for the design of its replacement. The same winter floods saw the bridge at Tenbury also swept away. This bridge across the River Teme was the joint responsibility of both Worcestershire and Shropshire and the bridge has a bend where the two counties meet. Telford was responsible for the repair to the northern (Shropshire) end of the bridge.

== Ellesmere Canal ==
Telford's reputation in Shropshire led to his appointment in 1793 to manage the detailed design and construction of the Ellesmere Canal, linking the ironworks and collieries of Wrexham via the north-west Shropshire town of Ellesmere, with Chester, utilising the existing Chester Canal, and then the River Mersey.

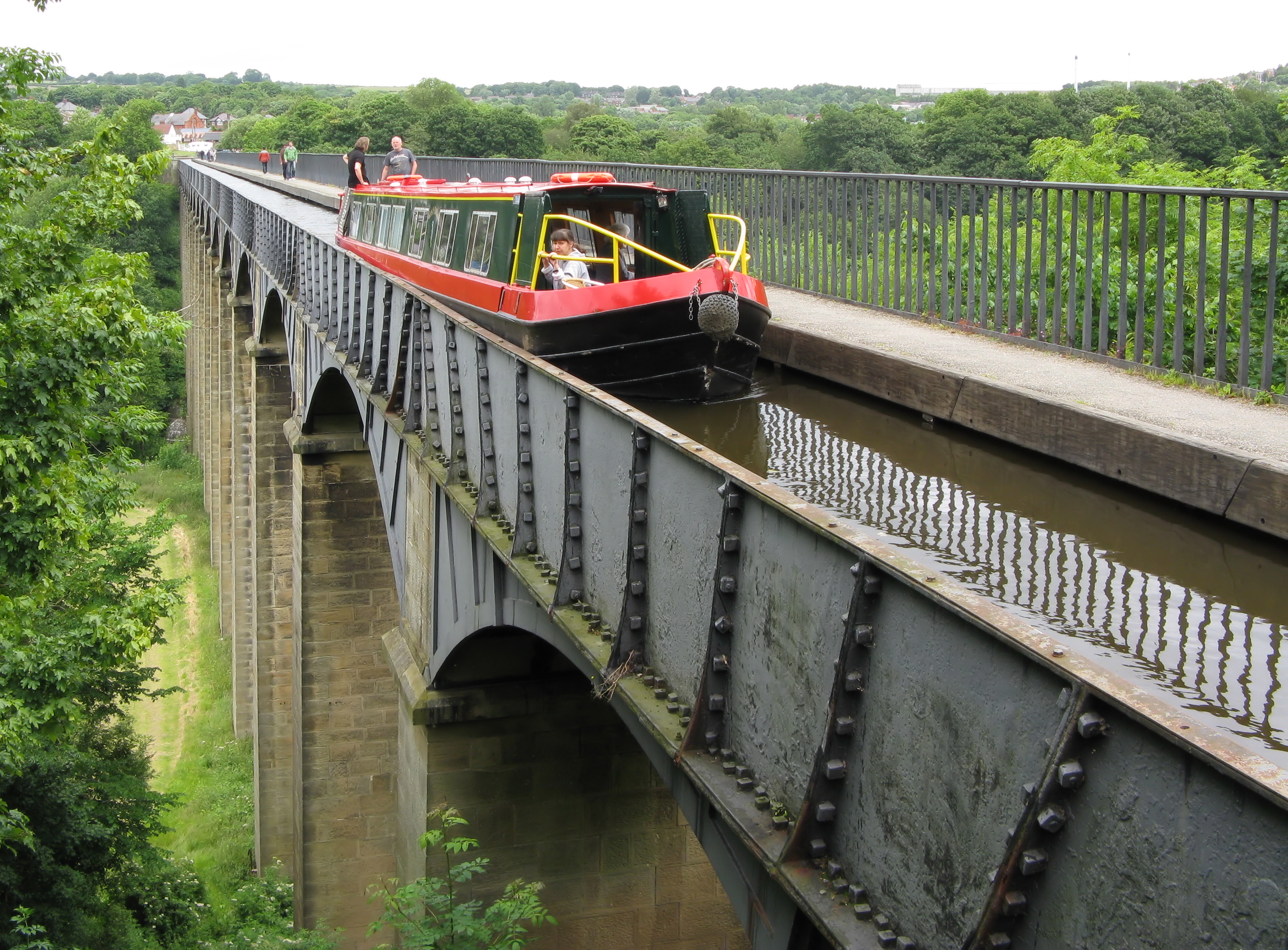
A canal boat traverses the Pontcysyllte aqueduct in North Wales

Among other structures, this involved the spectacular Pontcysyllte Aqueduct over the River Dee in the Vale of Llangollen, where Telford used a new method of construction consisting of troughs made from cast iron plates and fixed in masonry. Extending for over 1,000 feet (300 metres) with a height of 126 ft (38 m) above the valley floor, the Pontcysyllte Aqueduct consists of nineteen arches, each with a 45 ft (14 m) span. Being a pioneer in the use of cast-iron for large scaled structures, Telford had to invent new techniques, such as using boiling sugar and lead as a sealant on the iron connections. Canal engineer William Jessop oversaw the project but left the detailed execution of the project in Telford's hands. The aqueduct was designated a UNESCO World Heritage Site in 2009.

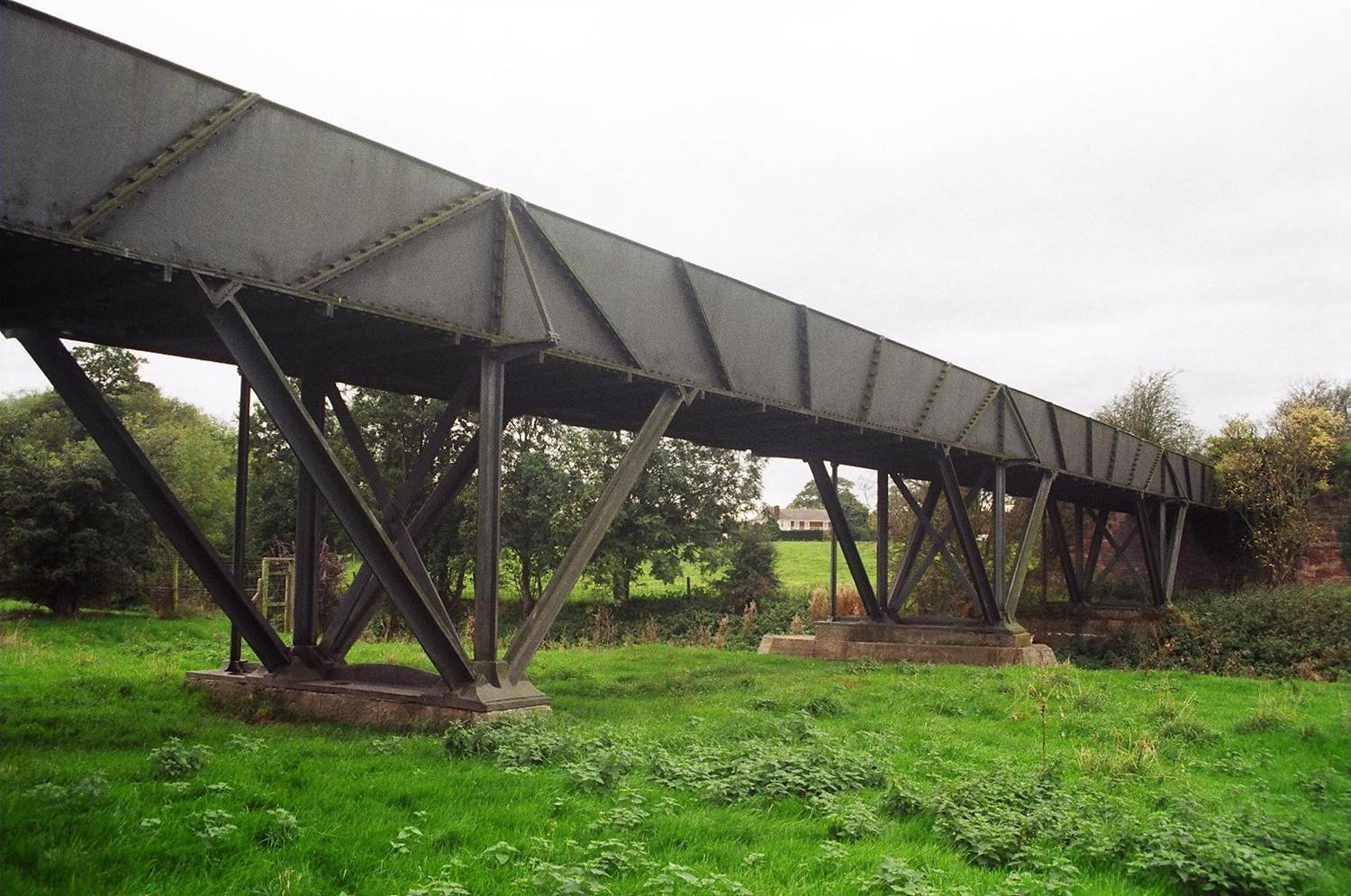
Longdon-on-Tern Aqueduct in Shropshire

The same period also saw Telford involved in the design and construction of the Shrewsbury Canal. When the original engineer, Josiah Clowes, died in 1795, Telford succeeded him. One of Telford's achievements on this project was the design of Longdon-on-Tern Aqueduct, the cast-iron aqueduct at Longdon-on-Tern, pre-dating that at Pontcysyllte, and substantially bigger than the UK's first cast-iron aqueduct, built by Benjamin Outram on the Derby Canal just months earlier. The aqueduct is no longer in use, but is preserved as a distinctive piece of canal engineering.

The Ellesmere Canal was left uncompleted in 1805 because it failed to generate the revenues needed to finance the connecting sections to Chester and Shrewsbury. However, alongside his canal responsibilities, Telford's reputation as a civil engineer meant he was constantly consulted on numerous other projects. These included water supply works for Liverpool, improvements to London's docklands and the rebuilding of London Bridge (c. 1800).

Most notably (and again William Pulteney was influential), in 1801 Telford devised a master plan to improve communications in the Highlands of Scotland, a massive project that was to last some 20 years. It included the building of the Caledonian Canal along the Great Glen and redesign of sections of the Crinan Canal, some 920 miles (1,480 km) of new roads, over a thousand new bridges (including the Craigellachie Bridge), numerous harbour improvements (including works at Aberdeen, Dundee, Peterhead, Wick, Portmahomack and Banff), and 32 new churches.

Telford also undertook highway works in the Scottish Lowlands, including 184 miles (296 km) of new roads and numerous bridges, ranging from a 112 ft (34 m) span stone bridge across the Dee at Tongueland in Kirkcudbright (1805–06) to the 129 ft (39 m) tall Cartland Crags bridge near Lanark (1822).

In 1809, Telford was tasked with improving the Howth Road in Dublin, to connect the new harbour at Howth to the city of Dublin as part of wider plan to improve communication between Dublin and London. The milestones that are a feature of this route from Howth to the GPO on O'Connell Street still mark the route. He also drafted the first design of the Ulster Canal. Irish engineer, William Dargan, was trained by Telford.

Telford was consulted in 1806 by the King of Sweden about the construction of a canal between Gothenburg and Stockholm. His plans were adopted and construction of the Göta Canal began in 1810. Telford travelled to Sweden at that time to oversee some of the more important initial excavations.

Many of Telford's projects were undertaken due to his role as a member of the Exchequer Bill Loan Commission, an organ set up under the Public Works Loans Act 1817 (57 Geo. 3. c. 34), to help finance public work projects that would generate employment.

== The 'Colossus of Roads' ==
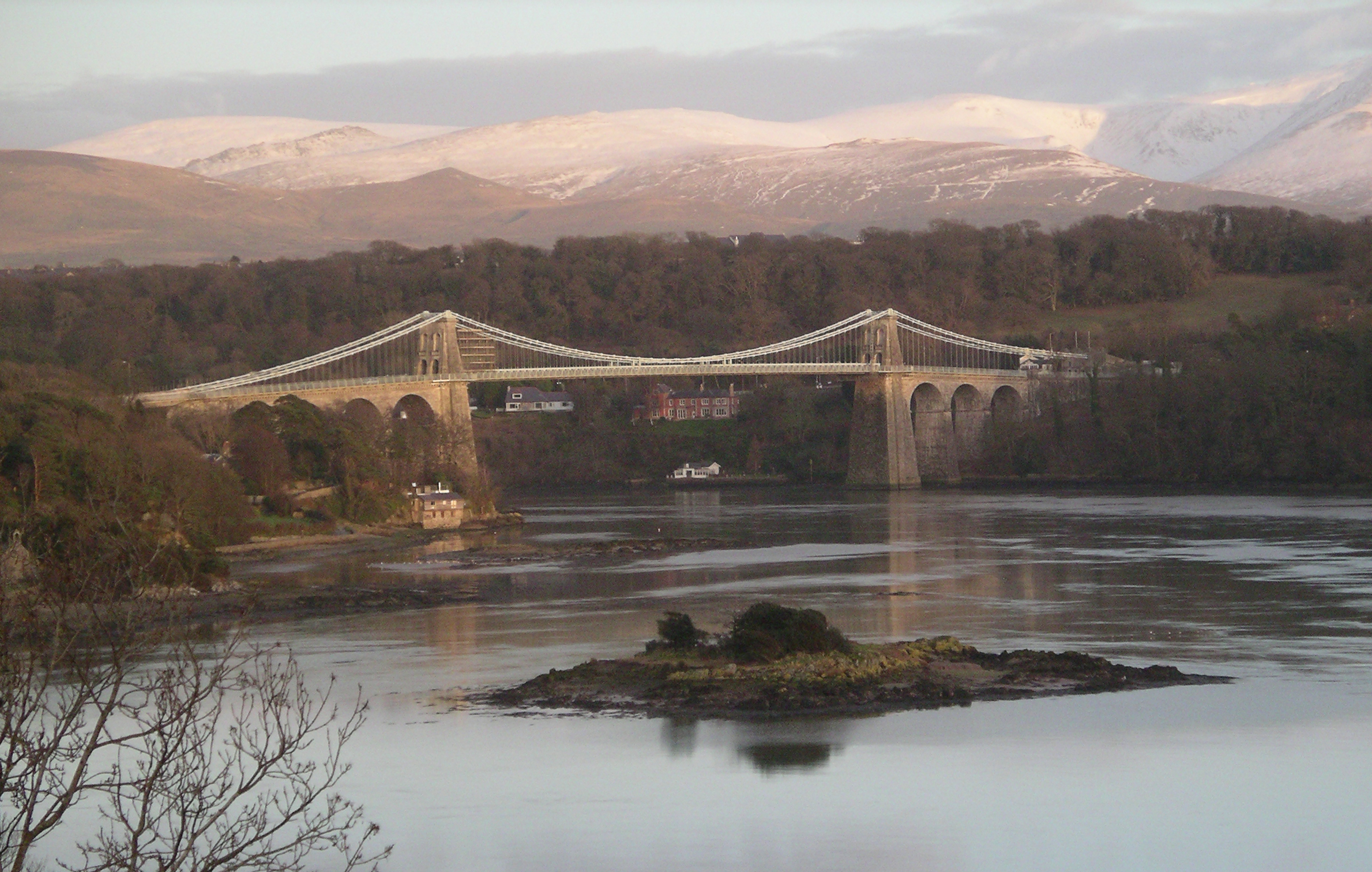
Menai Suspension Bridge

During his later years, Telford was responsible for rebuilding sections of the London to Holyhead road, a task completed by his assistant of ten years, John MacNeill; today, much of the route is the A5 trunk road, although the Holyhead Road diverted off the A5 along what is now parts of A45, A41 and A464 through the cities of Coventry, Birmingham and Wolverhampton. Between London and Shrewsbury, most of the work amounted to improvements. Beyond Shrewsbury, and especially beyond Llangollen, the work often involved building a highway from scratch. Notable features of this section of the route include the Waterloo Bridge across the River Conwy at Betws-y-Coed, the ascent from there to Capel Curig and then the descent from the pass of Nant Ffrancon towards Bangor. Between Capel Curig and Bethesda, in the Ogwen Valley, Telford deviated from the original road, built by Romans during their occupation of this area.

On the island of Anglesey a new embankment across the Stanley Sands to Holyhead was constructed, but the crossing of the Menai Strait was the most formidable challenge, overcome by the Menai Suspension Bridge (1819–26). Spanning 580 feet (180 m), this was the longest suspension bridge of the time. Unlike modern suspension bridges, Telford used individually linked 9.5-foot (2.9 m) iron eye bars for the cables.

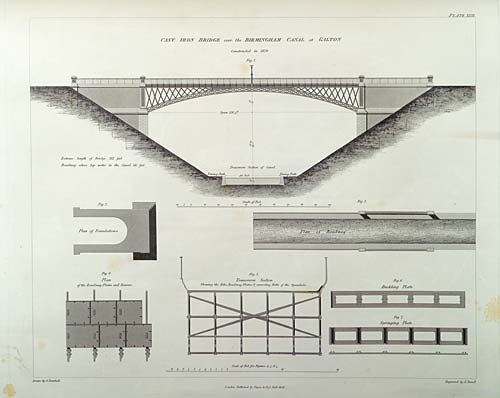
Galton Bridge

Telford also worked on the North Wales coast road between Chester and Bangor, including another major suspension bridge at Conwy, opened later the same year as its Menai counterpart.

Further afield Telford designed a road to cross the centre of the Isle of Arran. Named the 'String road', this route traverses bleak and difficult terrain to allow traffic to cross between east and west Arran avoiding the circuitous coastal route. His work on improving the Glasgow – Carlisle road, later to become the A74, has been described as "a model for future engineers."

Telford improved on methods for the building of macadam roads by improving the selection of stone based on thickness, taking into account traffic, alignment and slopes.

The punning nickname 'Colossus of Roads' was given to Telford by his friend, the eventual Poet Laureate, Robert Southey.

In 1821, he was elected a foreign member of the Royal Swedish Academy of Sciences.

== The 'Telford Church' ==
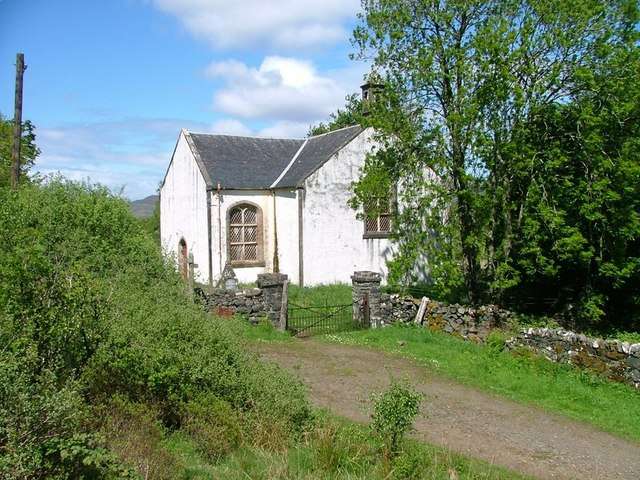
A 'Telford church' on Ulva (1827/8) in the Inner Hebrides

An Act of Parliament in 1823 provided a grant of £50,000 for the building of up to 40 churches and manses in communities without any church buildings (hence the alternative name: 'Parliamentary Church' or 'Parliamentary Kirk'). The total cost was not to exceed £1500 on any site and Telford was commissioned to undertake the design. He developed a simple church of T-shaped plan and two manse designs – a single-storey and a two-storey, adaptable to site and ground conditions, and to brick or stone construction, at £750 each. Of the 43 churches originally planned, 32 were eventually built around the Scottish highlands and islands (the other 11 were achieved by redoing existing buildings). The last of these churches was built in 1830. Some have been restored and/or converted to private use.

== Late career ==
Other works by Telford include the St Katharine Docks (1824–28) close to Tower Bridge in central London, where he worked with the architect Philip Hardwick, the Gloucester and Berkeley Ship Canal (today known as the Gloucester and Sharpness Canal), Over Bridge near Gloucester, the second Harecastle Tunnel on the Trent and Mersey Canal (1827), and the Birmingham and Liverpool Junction Canal (today part of the Shropshire Union Canal) – started in May 1826 but finished, after Telford's death, in January 1835. At the time of its construction in 1829, Galton Bridge was the longest single span in the world. Telford surveyed and planned the Macclesfield Canal, which was completed by William Crosley (or Crossley). He also built Whitstable harbour in Kent in 1832, in connection with the Canterbury and Whitstable Railway with an unusual system for flushing out mud using a tidal reservoir. He also completed the Grand Trunk after James Brindley died due to being over-worked.

In 1820, Telford was appointed the first President of the recently formed Institution of Civil Engineers, a post he held until his death.

== Freemasonry ==
He was a founder member of Phoenix Lodge, No. 257 (in Portsmouth). Telford designed a room within the George Inn for the lodge. In 1786 he became an affiliate member of Salopian Lodge, No. 262 (Shrewsbury, England).

== Telford's death ==
Telford's young draughtsman and clerk 1830–34 George Turnbull in his diary states:

On the 23rd [August 1834] Mr Telford was taken seriously ill of a bilious derangement to which he had been liable ... he grew worse and worse … [surgeons] attended him twice a day, but it was to no avail for he died on the 2nd September, very peacefully at about 5pm. … His old servant James Handscombe and I were the only two in the house [24 Abingdon Street, London] when he died. He was never married. Mr Milne and Mr Rickman were, no doubt, Telford's most intimate friends. ... I went to Mr Milne and under his direction … made all the arrangements about the house and correspondence. ... Telford had no blood relations that we knew of. The funeral took place on the 10th September [in Westminster Abbey]. ... Mr Telford was of the most genial disposition and a delightful companion, his laugh was the heartiest I ever heard; it was a pleasure to be in his society.

Thomas Telford was buried in the nave of Westminster Abbey; a statue was erected to him nearby, in St Andrew's Chapel adjoining the north transept.

Throughout his life Telford had a great affection for his birthplace of Eskdale and its people and in his will left legacies to the two local libraries at Westerkirk and Langholm.

== Honours ==
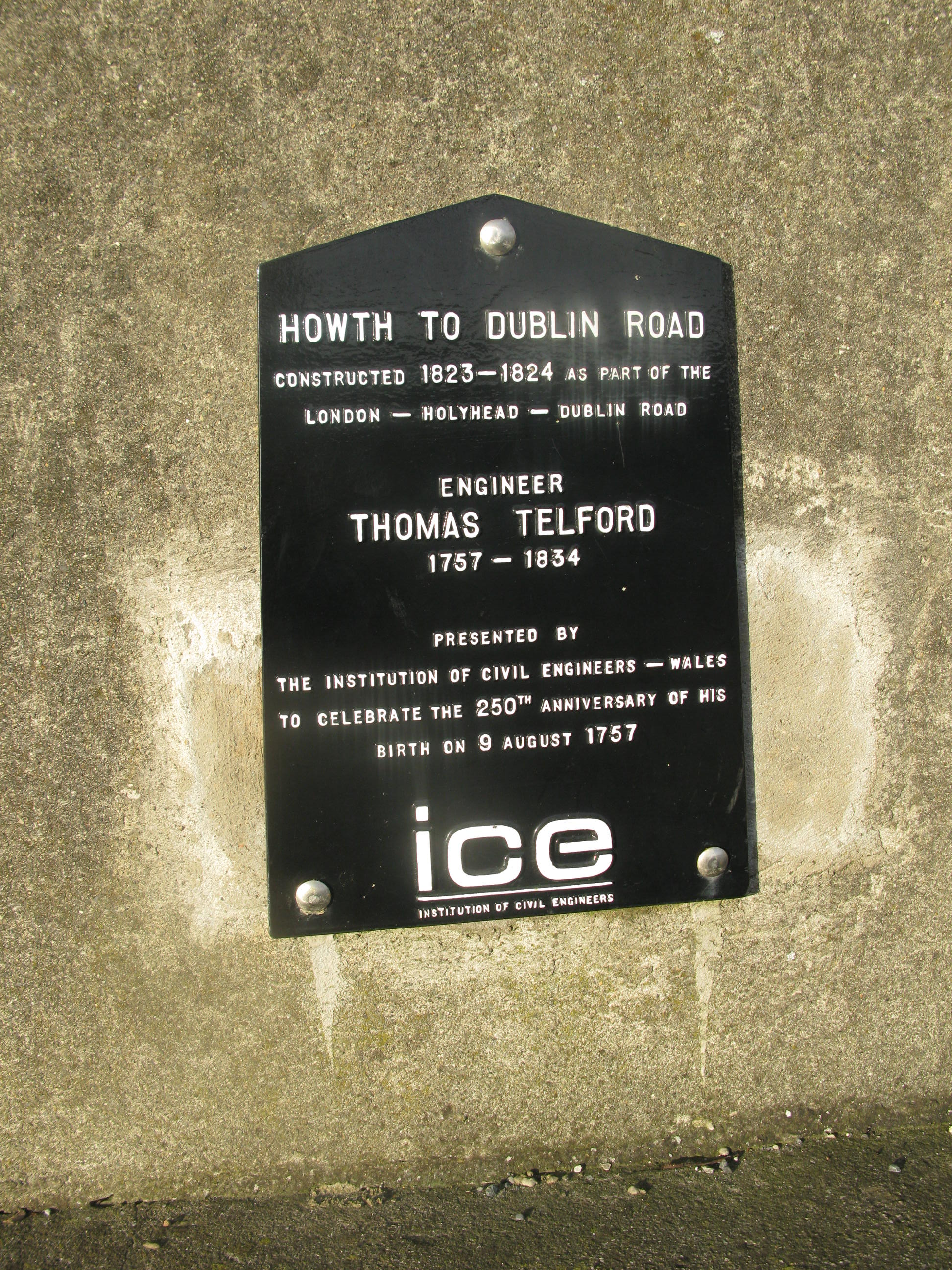
Plaque to Telford at the corner of Bayside and the Coast Road, Dublin

In 2011 he was one of seven inaugural inductees to the Scottish Engineering Hall of Fame.

== Telford the poet ==
Telford's reputation as a man of letters may have preceded his fame as an engineer: he had published poetry between 1779 and 1784, and an account of a tour of Scotland with Robert Southey. His will left bequests to Southey (who would later write Telford's biography), the poet Thomas Campbell (1777–1844) and to the publishers of the Edinburgh Encyclopædia (to which he had been a contributor).

George Turnbull states that Telford wrote and gave him a poem:

On reading an account of the death of ROBERT BURNS, the SCOT POET

CLAD in the sable weeds of woe,
The Scottish genius mourns,
As o'er your tomb her sorrows flow,
The "narrow house" of Burns.'

Each laurel round his humble urn,
She strews with pious care,
And by soft airs to distance borne,
These accents strike the ear.

Farewell my lov'd, my favourite child,
A mother's pride farewell!
The muses on thy cradle smiled,
Ah! now they ring thy knell.

---- ten verses and then ----

And round the tomb the plough shall pass,
And yellow autumn smile;
And village maids shall seek the place,
To crown thy hallowed pile.

While yearly comes the opening spring,
While autumn wan returns;
Each rural voice shall grateful sing,
And SCOTLAND boasts of BURNS.

22nd August, 1796. T.T.

(Turnbull includes notes that explain nine references to Burns's life in the poem.)

Turnbull also states:

His ability and perseverance may be understood from various literary compositions of after life, such as the articles he contributed to the Edinburgh Encyclopædia, such as Architecture, Bridge-building, and Canal-making. Singular to say the earliest distinction he acquired in life was as a poet. Even at 30 years of age he reprinted at Shrewsbury a poem called "Eskdale", … Some others of his poems are in my possession.

Another example, later in Telford's life, was To Sir John Malcolm on Receiving His Miscellaneous Poems (1831).

== Bridges designed by Telford ==
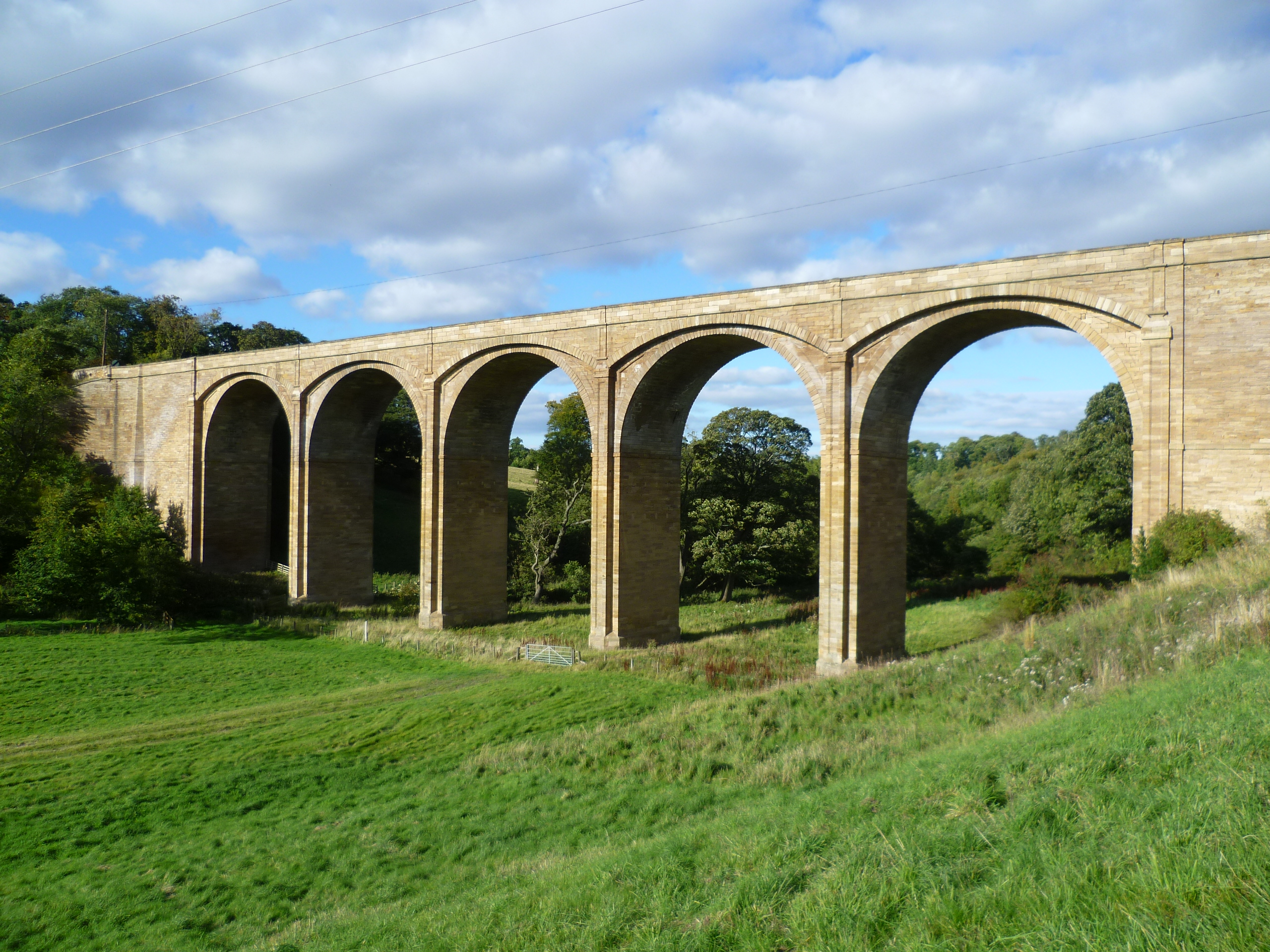
Telford's Lothian Bridge (1831) on the present-day A68

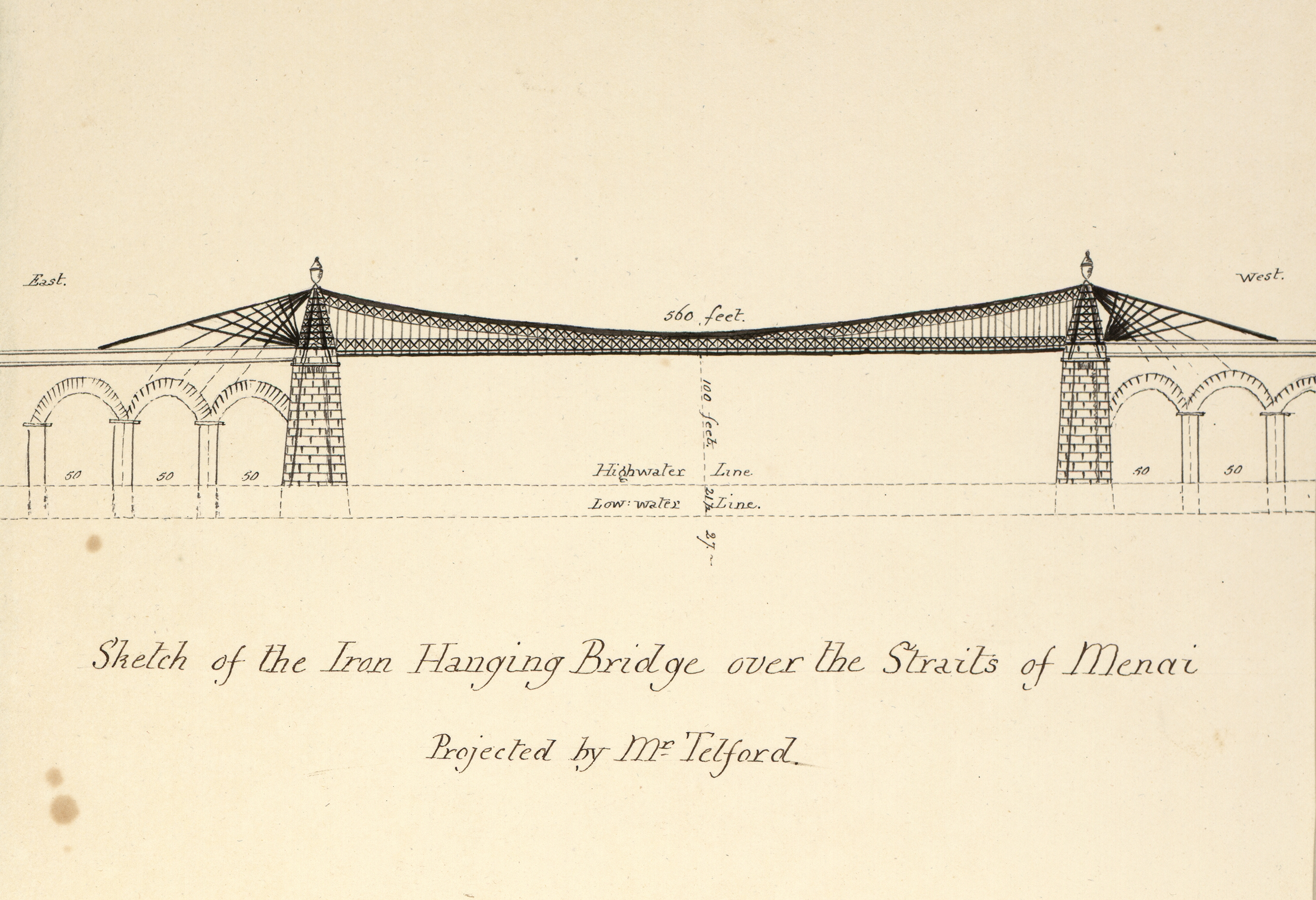
An early proposal for Telford's Menai Suspension Bridge

Telford designed many bridges and aqueducts during his career. They include:

Year	Name / Location
	London Bridge proposal
	Potarch Bridge
1792	Montford Bridge
1796	Buildwas Bridge
1796	Longdon-on-Tern Aqueduct
1797	Coundarbour Bridge
1798	Bewdley Bridge
1801	Chirk Aqueduct
1805	Pontcysyllte Aqueduct
1806	Glen Loy Aqueduct, Caledonian Canal
1808	Tongland Bridge
1809	Dunkeld Bridge
1810	Bridgnorth bridge
1811	Helmsdale bridge
1812	Bonar Bridge
1813	Telford Bridge, Invermoriston
1815	Craigellachie Bridge
1815	Dunans Bridge
1815	Waterloo Bridge, Betws-y-Coed
1818	Sligachan Old Bridge
1819	Bannockburn Bridge
1820	Cantlop Bridge
1823	Stanley Embankment
1824	Eaton Hall Bridge
1826	Conwy Suspension Bridge
1826	Menai Suspension Bridge
1826	Mythe Bridge
1827	Holt Fleet Bridge
1827	Over Bridge
1827	Bridge of Keig
1829	Galton Bridge
1831	Dean Bridge, Edinburgh
1831	Lothian Bridge, Pathhead
1832	Broomielaw Bridge, Glasgow (Note: The bridge was completed 1836; construction had begun March 1833, but the design and contract specification had been signed off by Telford in November 1832)

== Places named after Telford ==
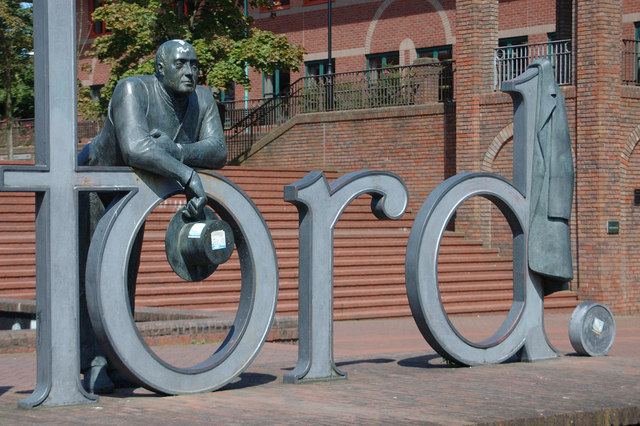
Statue of Thomas Telford outside the law courts in Telford, Shropshire

Telford is commemorated in the names of many sites:

- Telford New Town;
- Thomas Telford School;
- Thomas Telford Road, Langholm, where Telford was an apprentice in his early years;
- Telford Hall, a hall of residence at Loughborough University. A plaque in his honour hangs in the hall's common room;
- Telford, Pennsylvania, the Borough of County Line in Montgomery County, Pennsylvania changed its name to Telford in 1857, after the North Pennsylvania Railroad Company named its new station there "Telford" in honour of Thomas Telford;
- Telford College, Shropshire;
- Telford Bridge (footbridge), in 2008, a footbridge was erected over the Shubenacadie Canal in Dartmouth, Nova Scotia and named for Telford, who made important contributions to the nineteenth-century Canadian canal;
- Thomas Telford Basin, part of a residential development on the Ashton Canal in Manchester.

== Autobiography ==
Telford's autobiography, titled The Life of Thomas Telford, Civil Engineer, written by himself, was published posthumously in 1838.

== Bibliography ==
- The Life of Thomas Telford; civil engineer with an introductory history of roads and travelling in Great Britain Samuel Smiles (1867)
- Thomas Telford L. T. C. Rolt, Longmans (1958)
- Thomas Telford, Penguin (1979), ISBN 0-14-022064-X
- Thomas Telford, Engineer, Thomas Telford Ltd (1980), ISBN 0-7277-0084-7
- Man of Iron: Thomas Telford and the Building of Britain, Julian Glover, Bloomsbury Publishing (2017), ISBN 9781408837467

== See also ==
- Works of Thomas Telford
- Telford Medal

=== People acquainted with Thomas Telford ===
- Charles Atherton, fellow civil engineer
- Hugh Baird (engineer), fellow civil engineer
- Hamilton Fulton, fellow civil engineer
- John Gibb (engineer), fellow civil engineer
- William Hazledine, supplied ironwork for many projects of Thomas Telford
- William Jessop, fellow civil engineer
- John Benjamin Macneill, fellow civil engineer
- Sir William Pulteney, 5th Baronet, patron of Thomas Telford
- William Reynolds (industrialist), constructed Longdon-on-Tern Aqueduct for Telford
- George Turnbull (civil engineer), fellow civil engineer

== Notes ==
Professional and academic associations
New creation	President of the Institution of Civil Engineers; March 1820 – September 1834	Succeeded by James Walker
