= Mythe Bridge =

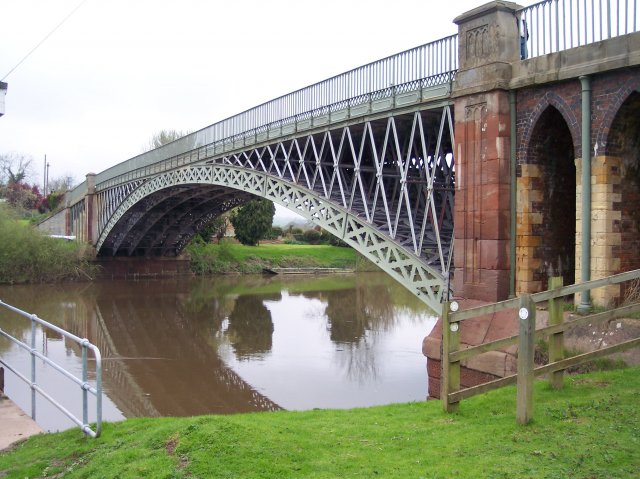
- Coordinates: 52.0020°N 2.1635°W
- Crosses: River Severn
- Locale: Tewkesbury, Gloucestershire

Characteristics
- Design: Arch bridge
- Material: Cast iron
- Total length: 170 feet (52 m)

History
- Designer: Thomas Telford
- Construction end: April 1826
- Construction cost: £14,500

Location
- Interactive map of Mythe Bridge

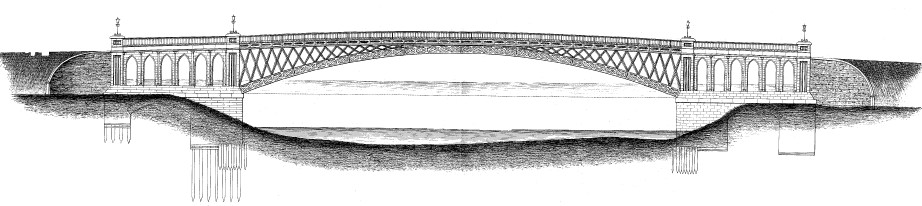
Drawing from Transactions of the I.C.E. 1838

Mythe Bridge carries the A438 road across the River Severn at Tewkesbury. It is a cast-iron arch bridge spanning 170 feet (52 m) and 24 feet (7.3 m) wide, designed by Thomas Telford and completed in April 1826. It is a Grade II* listed structure.

With authorisation given by the Tewkesbury Severn Bridge and Roads Act 1823 (4 Geo. 4. c. ii), Telford was appointed to design the bridge in 1823, following a dispute between the bridge trustees and their existing architect, who had proposed a bridge with three shorter iron arches. Telford changed the scheme to a single span so as to reduce interference with navigation of the river, and also to eliminate the expense of constructing foundations in the river gravels.

Like Telford's Craigellachie Bridge, Mythe Bridge was cast by William Hazledine, and is similar in form to Telford's Galton Bridge, which spans the Birmingham Canal at Smethwick. It has six cast iron ribs, each cast in 23-foot (7m) lengths, with spandrels filled with X-shaped bracing. Telford described the iron as "best Shropshire iron, commonly called No. 2"'. The arch rises 17 feet (5.2m), one tenth of the span. The X-bracing carries the diagonal crossed bracing to the spandrels beneath the beam, as well as to the carriageway and balustrade. The abutments at either end of the bridge houses a group of six tunnel vaults with pointed arches and stone quoins. These are separated by the attached colonnettes. Hugh McIntosh was contractor for the embankment and abutments.

The total cost of the bridge including masonry approaches was £14,500, It was originally a toll bridge, but tolls were removed in 1850. An Ordnance Survey map of 1884 shows a toll booth at either end of the bridge.

Telford wrote:

I reckon this the most handsomest bridge which has been built under my direction ...

The bridge was designated a Grade II* listed building on 4 March 1952, the reason for listing it being that it is of "technological interest as a bridge of iron construction with a 52m span designed in the early 1820s, part of the first generation of this technologically significant type of bridge" and because of its "engineering interest as a significant bridge built by Thomas Telford." Historic England has placed the bridge on the Heritage at Risk register.

In 1923, the decking was strengthened by adding a reinforced concrete slab. In 1990, tests showed the bridge was too weak for many heavy goods vehicles, and traffic was limited to a 7.5 ton maximum. This was increased to 17 tons after the bridge had been strengthened in 1992. The secondary members needed strengthening and this was effected by enhancing the shear strength of the transverse cross beams by bonding steel plates to the web of the cross beams. The longitudinal cross-bracing was strengthened by using angle splints and the space between the splints and the cross-bracing was grouted. Additional transverse bracing was supplied by reinforcing the central spine of the arch, with one end bolted to steel sleeves, and the other end bolted to the cross beams at the top of the arch.

== See also ==
- Crossings of the River Severn
- List of bridges in the United Kingdom
