= Holt Fleet Bridge =

Bridge over the River Severn in Worcestershire, England

Coordinates: 52.26757°N 2.26079°W

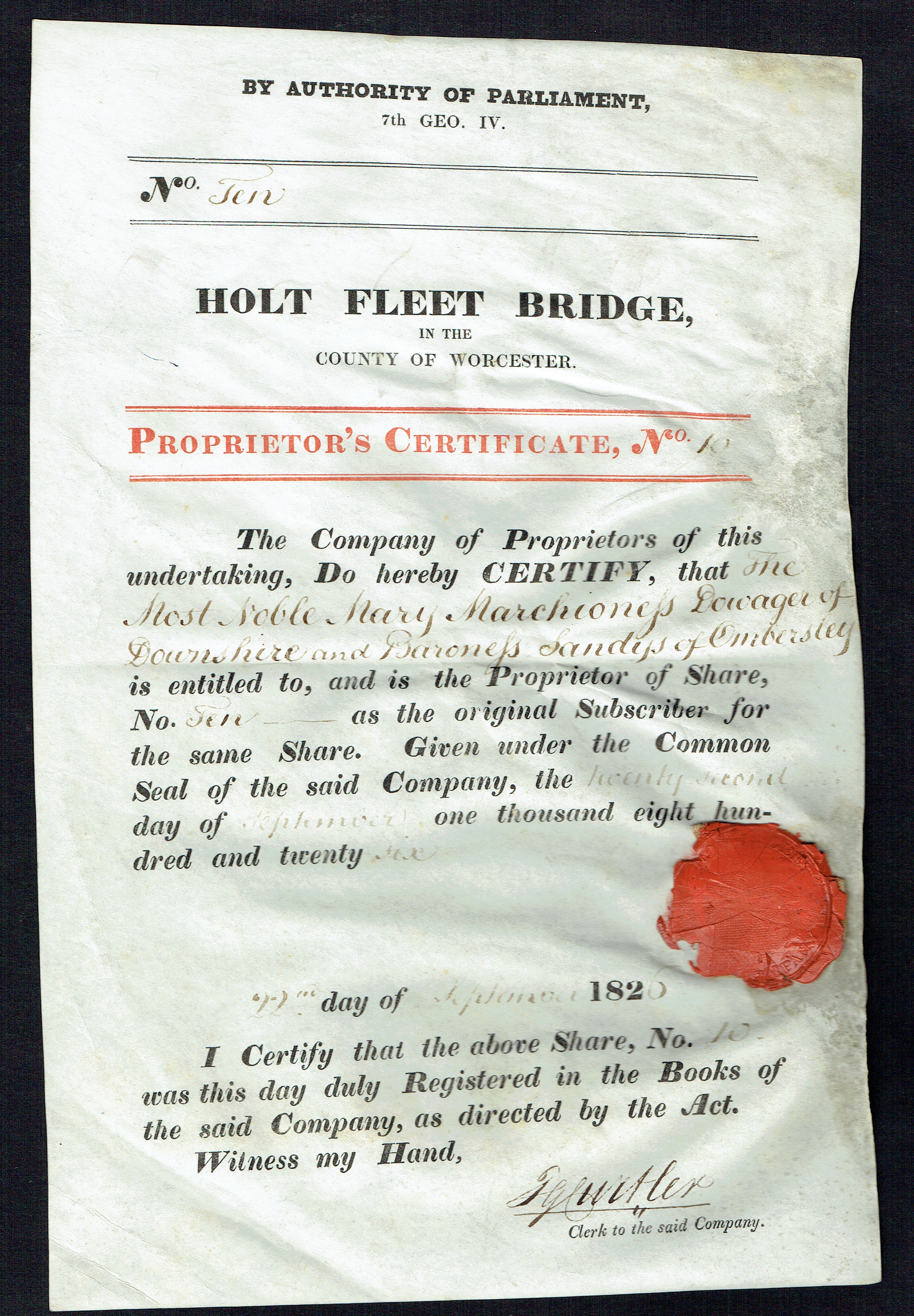
Proprietor's Certificate of the Holt Fleet Bridge, issued 22 September 1826

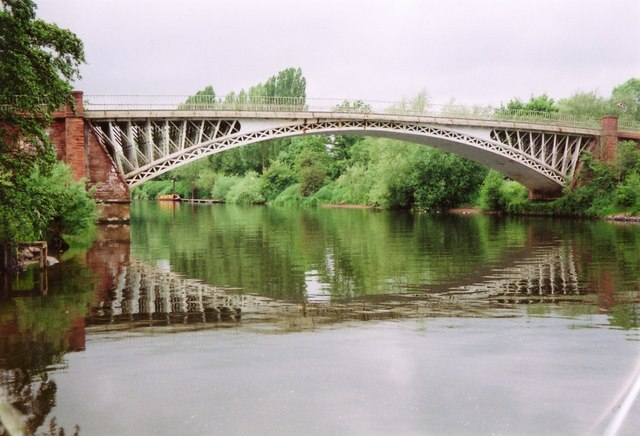
Holt Fleet bridge

Holt Fleet Bridge, also known as Holt Bridge, is a cast-iron arch bridge over the River Severn, at Holt in Worcestershire, England. It has a span of 150 feet (46 m); it was designed by Thomas Telford and opened in 1828. It is Grade II listed, and is similar to Telford's Galton Bridge, which is a Grade I listed structure that spans his BCN New Main Line canal at Smethwick.

The bridge was built with five cast-iron ribs, with X-braced spandrels, as were several of Telford's bridges. It was strengthened in 1928. when the upper and lower parts of each rib and some of the diagonal struts above them were encased in concrete. The road deck was rebuilt in reinforced concrete and widened at the same time.

Semicircular arches at each end, built in red sandstone, allow for the passage of riverbank foot-traffic and floodwater.

== See also ==
- Crossings of the River Severn
