= Bettisfield railway station =

Disused railway station in Bettisford, Wrexham

Bettisfield
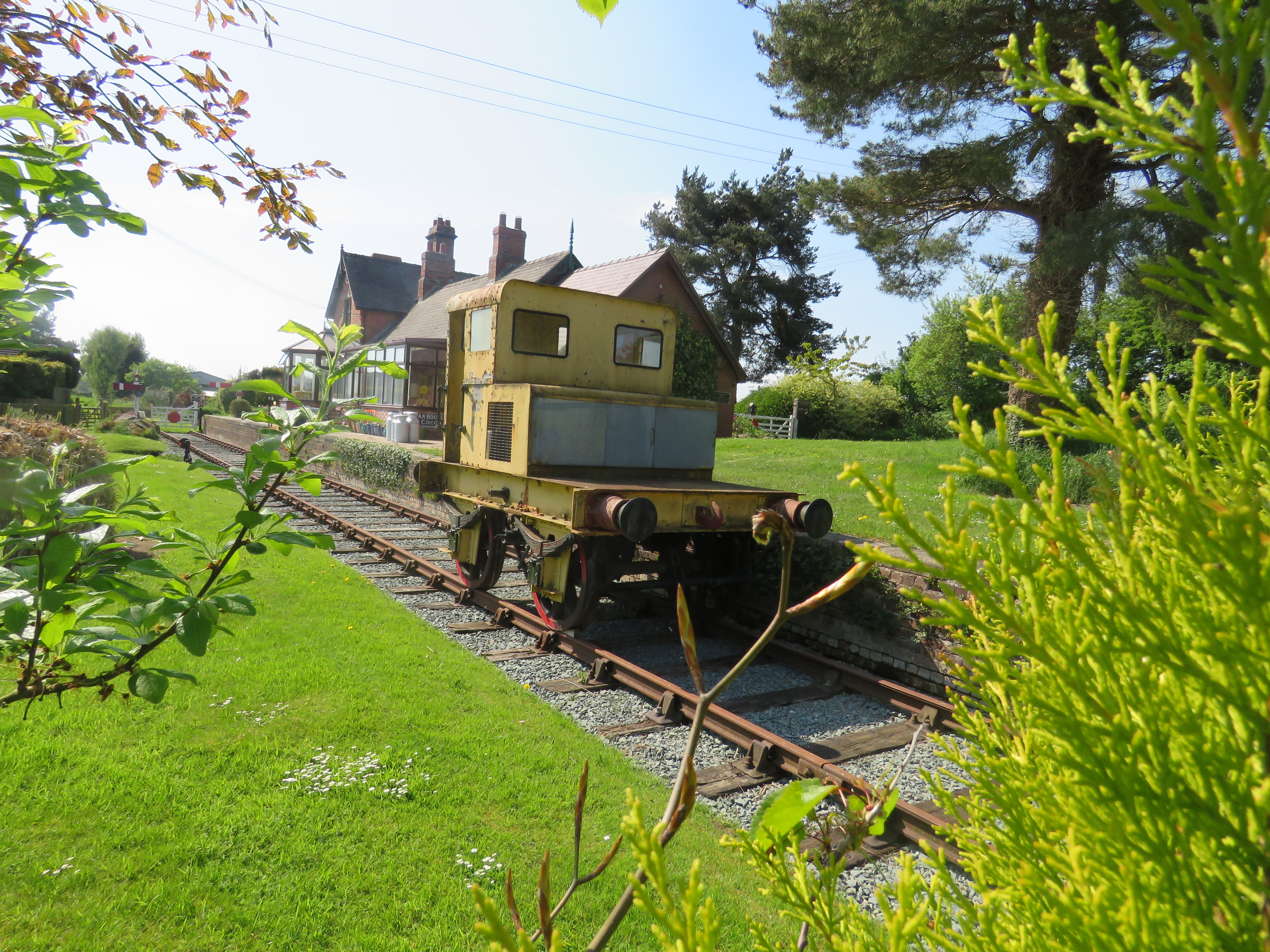
- A Baguley-Drewry shunter stands on a short length of track at the former Bettisfield station

General information
- Location: Bettisfield, Wrexham County Borough; Wales
- Coordinates: 52.9176°N 2.8041°W
- Grid reference: SJ460358
- Platforms: 1

Other information
- Status: Disused

History
- Original company: Oswestry, Ellesmere and Whitchurch Railway
- Pre-grouping: Cambrian Railways
- Post-grouping: Great Western Railway

Key dates
- 4 May 1863: Opened
- 18 January 1965: Closed
Location

Bettisfield railway station was a station in Bettisfield, Wrexham, Wales. The station was opened on 4 May 1863 and closed on 18 January 1965.

== Details ==
The station was situated to the west of the minor road that passes through Bettisfield. There was a single platform to the north of the tracks, with a two-storey station building, in which the station master lived. The layout included a 19-chain (1,300 ft; 380 m) passing loop, which was only used by goods trains, as there was no platform. The loop passed under the bridge at the eastern end of the site, before rejoining the main line. There was a smaller loop to the south of the main loop, and a siding to a substantial goods shed, which was designed to handle most traffic, including coal, minerals, livestock, general merchandise and vehicular traffic. About 0.5 miles (0.8 km) to the east was a private siding, which served the Midland Moss Litter Company peat works on Fenn's Moss.

To the west of the platform was a signal box. The locking room was built of brick, and it had a gable roof. The box could be "switched out", to enable the section from Whitchurch to Ellesmere to be operated as a single section. When it was not switched out, sections from Ellesmere to Bettisfield and Bettisfield to Fenn's Bank were controlled by Tyer's No.6 Tablet.

== Legacy ==
The station building is now used as a private dwelling, while the goods shed has been converted into apartments. The owner of the station building has laid a short length of track alongside the platform, and a Baguley Drewry 4-wheel diesel mechanical shunter has been parked there since at least 2012. The track to the east of the station acts as a drive for a number of houses that have been built near to the formation, and then provides access to Fenn's Moss and the derelict peat processing factory of Fenn's Old Works, where there was once a private siding.

Preceding station	Disused railways	Following station
Welshampton; Line and station closed	Cambrian Railways; Oswestry, Ellesmere and Whitchurch Railway	Fenn's Bank; Line and station closed
