= Rednal rail crash =

1865 UK rail accident with 13 deaths

Coordinates: 52.8416°N 2.9614°W

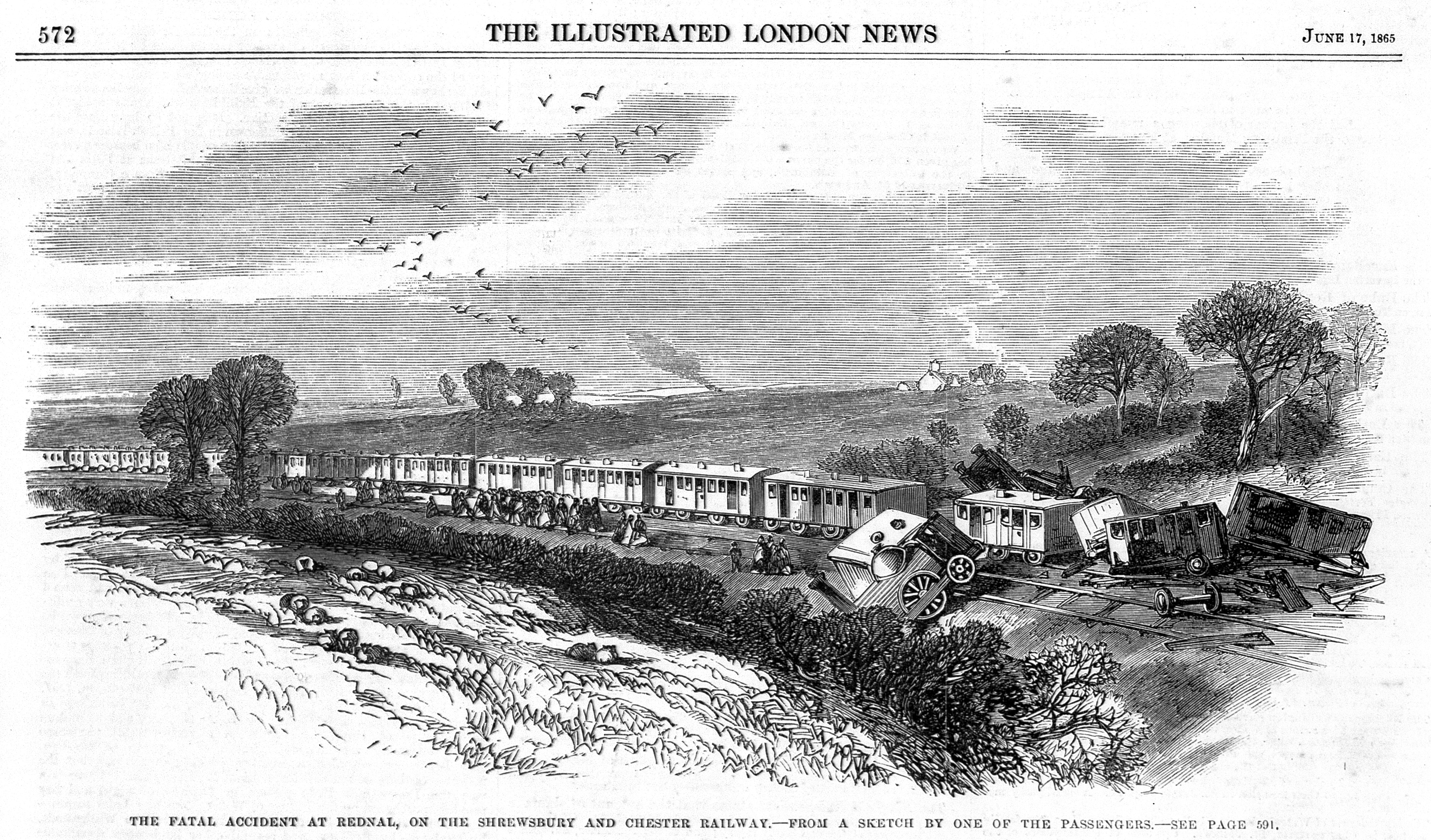
- Fatal railway accident at Rednall (The Illustrated London News, 1865)

Details
- Date: 7 June 1865
- Location: Rednal station, Shropshire
- Country: England
- Line: Shrewsbury to Chester Line
- Cause: Derailment due to excessive speed

Statistics
- Trains: 1
- Deaths: 13
- Injured: 30

The Rednal rail crash was a rail accident that occurred near Rednal station in Shropshire.

On 7 June 1865 a permanent way (groundwork and rails) gang were lifting and packing the "up" line 600 yards (550 m) north of Rednal station on a 1 in 132 gradient that falls from Whittington. A green flag had been set 1,100 yards (1,000 m) away at the top of the incline as a warning. At 12:29 an excursion train from Birkenhead left Chester for Shrewsbury consisting of 28 coaches and two brake vans and hauled by two locomotives. An additional four coaches were added at Gobowen.

When the train reached Whittington it began to gain speed on the gradient, but the driver of the front locomotive did not see the flag warning of the work ahead. The brakes were applied when the workmen were sighted, but it was too late to stop such a heavy train. The lead locomotive derailed on the unsupported track, but continued along the ballast until it reached points outside Rednal station where it ran off the rails and turned over. The extreme weight of the following train meant that the first four carriages were destroyed completely, killing 11 passengers and two train crew.

The enquiry, while criticizing the lack of braking power on such a massive train, blamed mainly the inadequate protection of the permanent way work, which should be supplemented by detonators.

== Sources ==
- Rolt, L.T.C.; Kichenside, Geoffrey (1982) [1955]. Red for Danger (4th ed.). Newton Abbot: David & Charles. pp. 126–127. ISBN 0-7153-8362-0.
