= Oswestry, Ellesmere and Whitchurch Railway =

19th century UK railway company

The Oswestry, Ellesmere and Whitchurch Railway was a railway company that constructed a line from Whitchurch via Ellesmere to Oswestry. Most of the line was in Shropshire but part entered Flintshire, now Wrexham County Borough. It was seen as a link from the local railways around Newtown to the London and North Western Railway, breaking the local monopoly of the Great Western Railway. It opened as a single line in 1863 and 1864. Throughout the construction period it was short of money, and was paid for by the contractor, who took shares. Sporadically through its life it became a useful part of a through route for mineral trains, but it never developed greatly.

The railway was amalgamated on 25 July 1864 with three other railways, the Oswestry and Newtown Railway, the Llanidloes and Newtown Railway and the Newtown and Machynlleth Railway, to form Cambrian Railways. Cambrian Railways was in turn amalgamated into the Great Western Railway on 1 January 1922.

It was the scene of a serious derailment of an excursion train at Welshampton in 1897.

The line closed in 1965.

== Origin ==
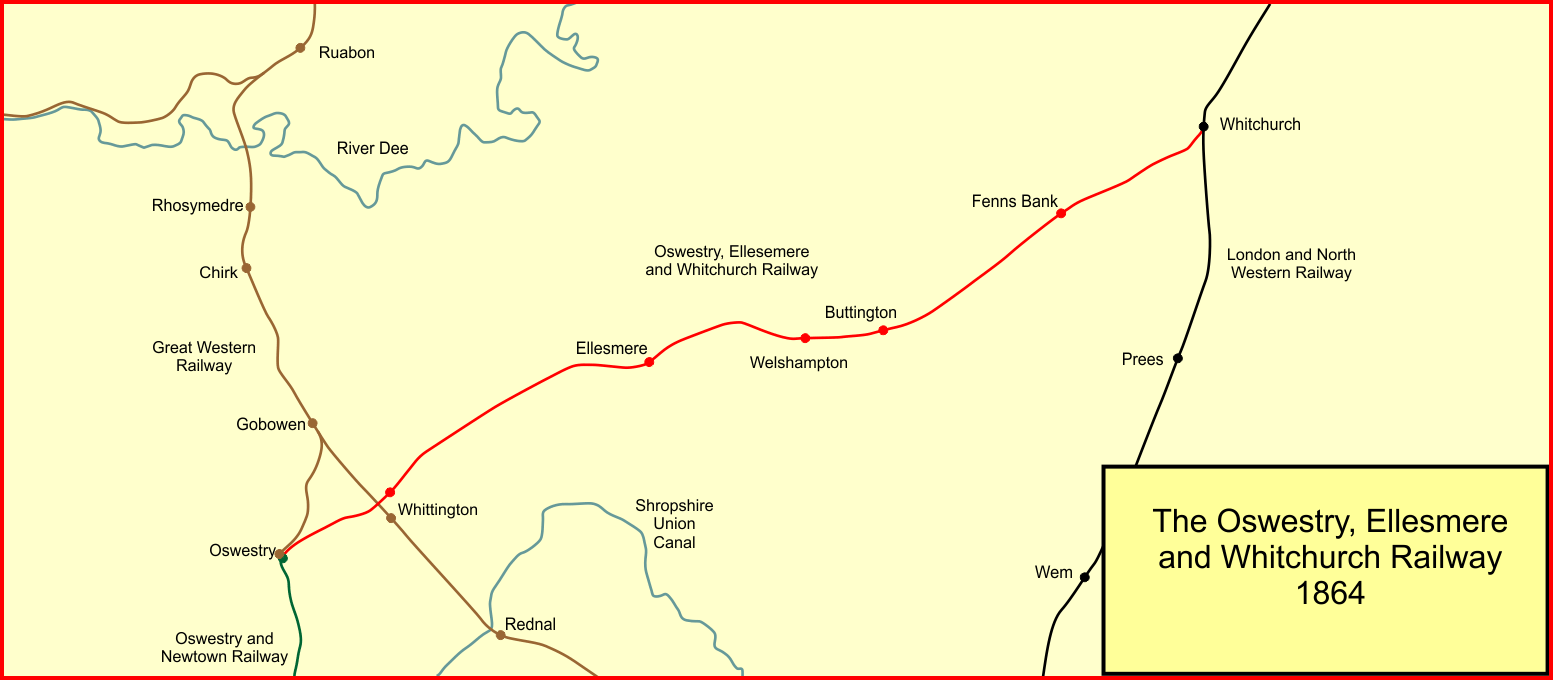
The Oswestry, Ellesmere and Whitchurch Railway network in 1864

In the early 1850s trunk railway schemes affiliated to the London and North Western Railway and to the Great Western Railway were promoted, to cross the Welsh hinterland, which as yet was without railways. None of the schemes was implemented and as a result a number of local proposals arose, to build short lines of only local significance. Thus by 1860 the Llanidloes and Newtown Railway, the Oswestry and Newtown Railway, and the Newtown and Machynlleth Railway were built or in course of building.

These railways needed access to the developing English network, and the Oswestry and Newtown Railway provided that by connecting with the Shrewsbury and Chester Railway, which was supported by the Great Western Railway, at Oswestry. The relationship with the GWR was sometimes rocky, however.

On 2 September 1858 the London and North Western Railway opened a single-track route from Crewe to Whitchurch and Shrewsbury. This suggested to the Welsh companies the possibility of an alternative to the GWR-dominated connection, if a line could be built to join the LNWR route. A public meeting was held in Ellesmere on 1 October 1860. It was said that not only would a line between Whitchurch and Oswestry serve local districts, but it would link the Newtown group of railways with Crewe, Manchester and the industrial northwest of England. Moreover the line could even form the basis of a line through to Milford Haven, connecting the northwest with an Atlantic port as an alternative to Liverpool.

Soon a provisional committee met to manage the engineering design and parliamentary process for the line. Intelligence was received that the Great Western Railway was planning branch extensions in the area and the committee planning the line to Whitchurch wanted to get the scheme under way before the GWR decided to interfere. On 9 January 1861 T & J Savin and Ward were appointed contractors and agreed to meet parliamentary expenses, provided the promoters acquired the necessary land and provided the initial cash for construction. The lack of money for preliminary expenses set the scene for the future. Still some interested parties were proposing extensions of the scheme to serve other areas locally, and potential investors were confused by the multiplicity of schemes that seemed to be competing for their approval. Extraction of coal was developing rapidly in districts near Ruabon and Ffrith, near Brymbo, and branches from the future line that could serve those locations too were being proposed.

== Authorisation ==
Oswestry, Ellesmere and Whitchurch Railway Act 1861
- Act of Parliament
- Parliament of the United Kingdom
- Long title: An Act for making a Railway from the Oswestry and Newtown Railway at Oswestry to the London and North-western Railway at Whitchurch in the County of Salop, and for other Purposes.
- Citation: 24 & 25 Vict. c. ccxxiii

Dates
- Royal assent: 1 August 1861

The Oswestry, Ellesmere and Whitchurch Railway Bill went to the 1861 session of Parliament; it was supported by the LNWR and strenuously opposed by the GWR. Fierce argument raged in the committee stages over the advantages of other rival schemes, but it was the Oswestry, Ellesmere and Whitchurch Railway Act 1861 (24 & 25 Vict. c. ccxxiii) that was passed on 1 August 1861; a GWR alternative was rejected. However the act stipulated that work was only to start on the Ellesmere to Whitchurch section: the continuation from Ellesmere to Oswestry was to be suspended until 1 September 1862, under a clause inserted by the Lords, which hoped for a reconciliation with the GWR to see if a scheme could be developed to link Ellesmere, Oswestry, Ruabon and Shrewsbury. Share capital of £150,000 was authorised. £18,000 had already been expended on the parliamentary battle.

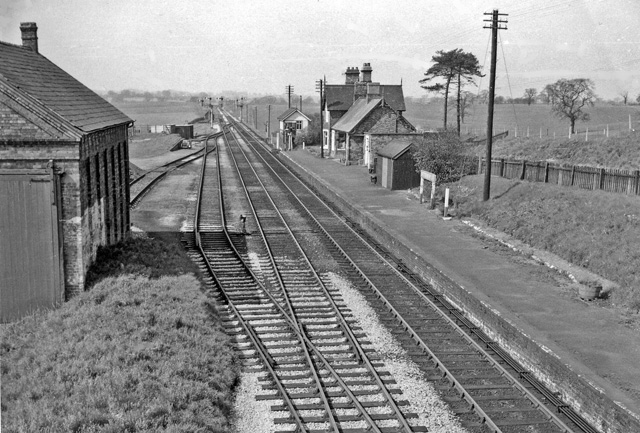
Bettisfield station in 1962

The OE&WR communicated with the GWR on 31 October 1861 offering cooperation in building junctions at Whittington, where their lines crossed, as a move towards the parliamentary desire for full cooperation, but the GWR rebuffed the move. Construction work started on 4 September, but when Savin and Company asked for £10,000 to reimburse their outlay on parliamentary expenses, the cost of buying land and carrying out preliminary works, the OE&WR had no money to meet this debt. The company had to ask the Oswestry and Newtown Railway to make the payment, taking OE&WR shares in exchange. The process was repeated only a month later when Savin was due more money.

Oswestry, Ellesmere and Whitchurch Railway (Extension) Act 1862
- Act of Parliament
- Parliament of the United Kingdom
- Long title: An Act for authorizing an Extension of the Oswestry, Ellesmere, and Whitchurch Railway, and for other Purposes.
- Citation: 25 & 26 Vict. c. ccxviii

Dates
- Royal assent: 7 August 1862

Once again mineowners and others in the Wrexham and Mold areas agitated for a branch connecting to the line, and the OE&WR company obtained powers for a line from Bettisfield to Wem in the Oswestry, Ellesmere and Whitchurch Railway (Extension) Act 1862 (25 & 26 Vict. c. ccxviii) on 7 August 1862, but this was never built.

== Construction ==
Within six months of the start of work on the Ellesmere to Whitchurch line, most of the track had been laid. The route lay across Whixall Moss (or Fenn's Moss), a three-mile (5 km) extent of bog. It was impossible to drain the moss to get a firm track foundation. While the average depth was estimated to be only about 12 feet (3.7 m), a surveyor lost a 35-foot (11 m) rod trying to find the bottom in one place. The line was built on a foundation formed of a raft of faggots.

Captain Henry Tyler inspected the line for the Board of Trade and approved it for the operation of passenger trains in May 1863; it was single-track line on a double-track formation. Goods train operation was started on 20 April 1863, and passenger trains followed on 4 May 1863; the line was worked by the LNWR.

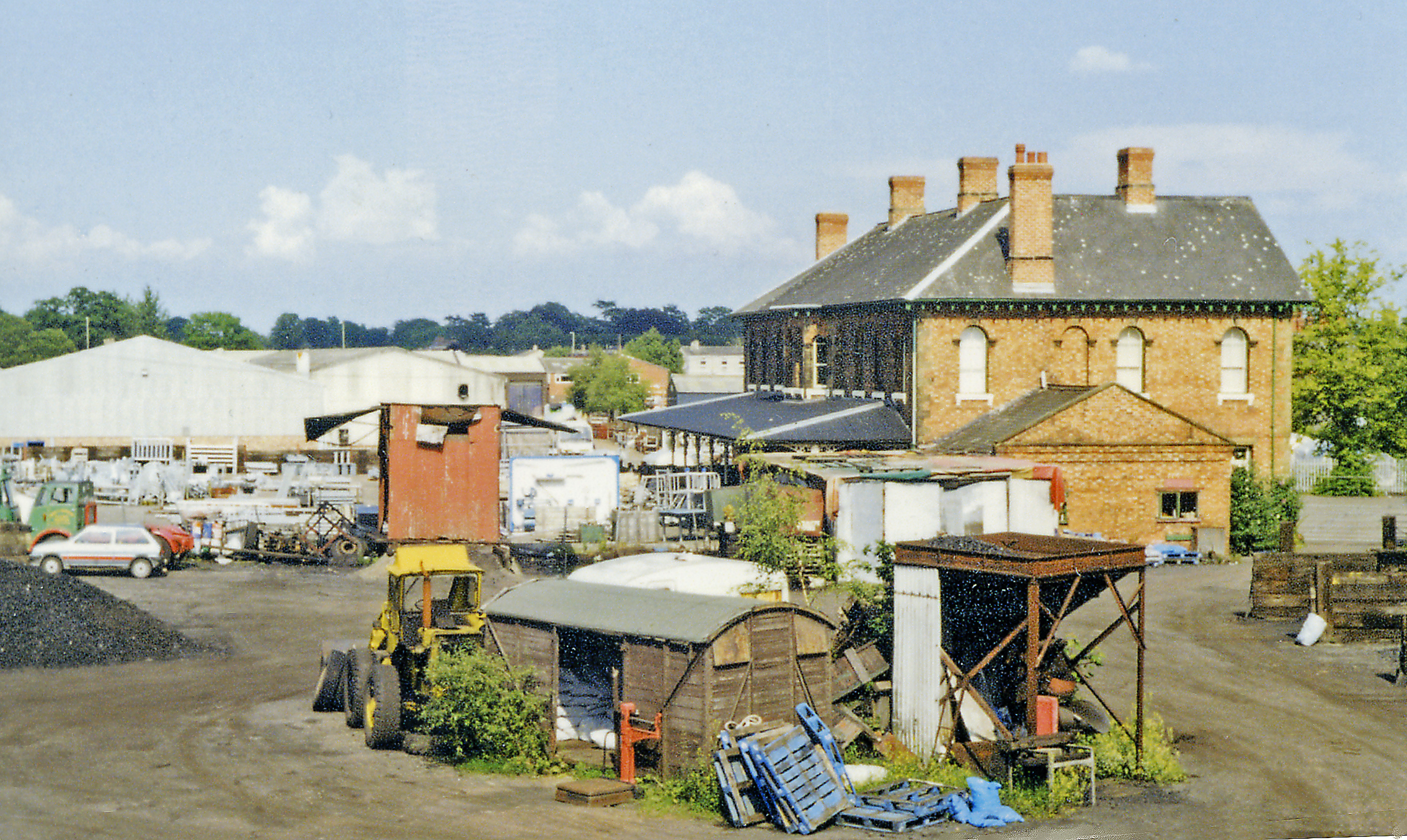
The former Ellesmere station in 1997

Work started on the 7 1/2-mile (12 km) section west from Ellesmere to Oswestry on 4 September 1862, three days after the date permitted in the original Act. The construction was straightforward and was completed on 27 July 1864.

At first Whittington was the only intermediate station between Ellesmere and Oswestry (above and a little distance from the GWR station). Frankton, serving the twin border villages of English Frankton and Welsh Frankton, was added in 1866 or 1867. Ellesmere was the only intermediate station with a passing loop. Permanent station buildings were not built at Fenn's Bank and Frankton until the early 1880s.

== Into the Cambrian Railways ==
The OE&WR realised that its small size and dependence on other railways made it vulnerable, and it negotiated with other lines for amalgamation. After a number of false starts, agreement was reached that the four Whitchurch–Machynlleth lines would amalgamate to form the Cambrian Railways Company, and this was authorised on 25 July 1864, two days earlier than completion of the line's construction.

== Wrexham and Ellesmere Railway ==
Wrexham was an important focus of coal and iron extraction. The London and North Western Railway was increasing its interests in the area, and wanted a link to its system from Wrexham. This could most conveniently be achieved by a link to Ellesmere on the OE&WR, and this was authorised by Parliament on 31 July 1885 as the Wrexham and Ellesmere Railway. It opened on 2 November 1895. There was a triangular junction at Ellesmere, but the Oswestry-facing curve was not much used until after 1911, when iron ore flows to and from South Wales were important for a few years. The southern end of the Wrexham line and the junctions at Ellesmere closed in 1962.

== Welshampton derailment ==
A serious derailment took place at Welshampton on 11 June 1897; twelve people died as a result. A Sunday school excursion was returning from Barmouth to Royton in Lancashire; it was a long and heavy train, pulled by two locomotives with tenders. A little east of Welshampton at about 35 mph (55 km/h) the tender of the second engine derailed, destroying the track as it ran, and most of the following coaches derailed too. Lt Col H.A. Yorke conducted a Board of Trade inquiry. In his report he said,

I walked over the line... and found that the majority of the old sleepers were so much decayed or split that they afforded but little hold to the spikes... I saw a number of loose spikes with their head projecting 1 inch to 1 1/2 inches above the chairs, and there was unmistakeable evidence that a considerable amount of movement, both vertical and lateral, of the chairs and spikes, occurs during the passage of trains.

A railway employee had stated that a four-wheel brake and third-class coach (referred to as a "van") was rough-riding but Yorke made it clear that he discounted the relevance of this: "My opinion [is] that the van had nothing to do with the derailment".

It has been suggested that the original displacement of the road, was caused by the Lancashire and Yorkshire van, and that this was the first to leave the rails, pulling the tender and carriages after it. But the probabilities seem to me to be all the other way if the permanent-way was strong enough to withstand the rocking motion of the two engines (each with its tender weighing 70 3/4 tons) it is hardly conceivable that it would be disturbed by a relatively light vehicle of 10 tons weight... The lateral strain produced by the rear tender alone must necessarily have been far greater than that caused by the four wheeled vehicle...

But most careful consideration of all the circumstances confirms me in the belief, that this most serious accident was certainly caused due to the dislocation of the permanent way produced by the high speed and the consequent oscillation of the two heavy engines and tenders of the train, that the second tender was probably the first vehicle to leave the rails and that the derailment would have occurred even if the van had not been present... From what I have said above it is evident that the condition of the road demands the immediate attention of the Cambrian company.

== Closure ==
After World War II use of the railways in rural locations fell off rapidly as people turned to road transport for goods and personal transportation. The entire route between Whitchurch, Oswestry and Buttington was closed on 18 January 1965, except that the Ellesmere to Whitchurch goods service continued for a few weeks, closing on 27 March 1965.

== Station list ==
- Whitchurch; London and North Western Railway station; opened 1 September 1858; still open;
- Fenn's Bank; opened 4 May 1863; closed 18 January 1965;
- Bettisfield; opened 4 May 1863; closed 18 January 1965;
- Welshampton; opened 4 May 1863; closed 18 January 1965;
- Ellesmere; opened 4 May 1863; closed 18 January 1965;
- Frankton; opened January 1867; closed 18 January 1965;
- Whittington; opened 27 July 1864; renamed Whittington High Level 1 July 1924; closed 4 January 1960;
- Tinkers Green Halt; opened 16 October 1939; closed 18 January 1965;
- Oswestry; Oswestry and Newtown Railway station; opened 1 May 1860; closed 7 November 1966.

== Nature reserve ==
The central section of the line is now part of the Fenn's, Whixall and Bettisfield Mosses National Nature Reserve.
