= Welsh Frankton =

Village in Shropshire, England

Coordinates: 52°53′31″N 2°56′48″W

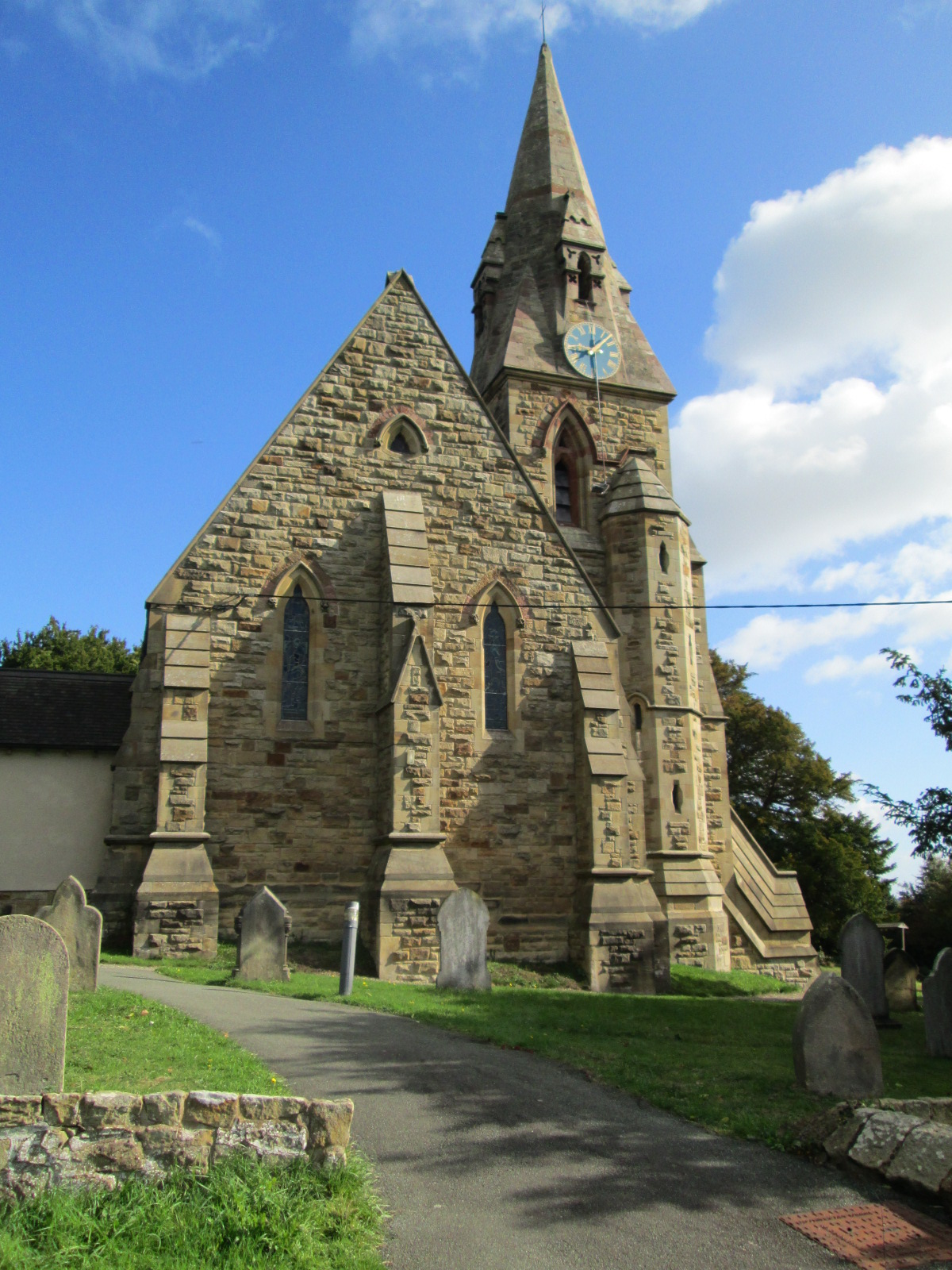
- St Andrew's Church

- Location within Shropshire
- OS grid reference: SJ 364 331
- Civil parish: Ellesmere Rural
- Unitary authority: Shropshire
- Ceremonial county: Shropshire
- Region: West Midlands
- Country: England
- Sovereign state: United Kingdom
- Police: West Mercia
- Fire: Shropshire
- Ambulance: West Midlands

Welsh Frankton is a village in the civil parish of Ellesmere Rural in Shropshire, England, about 2.5 miles (4.0 km) southwest of Ellesmere, on the A495 road.

== Description ==
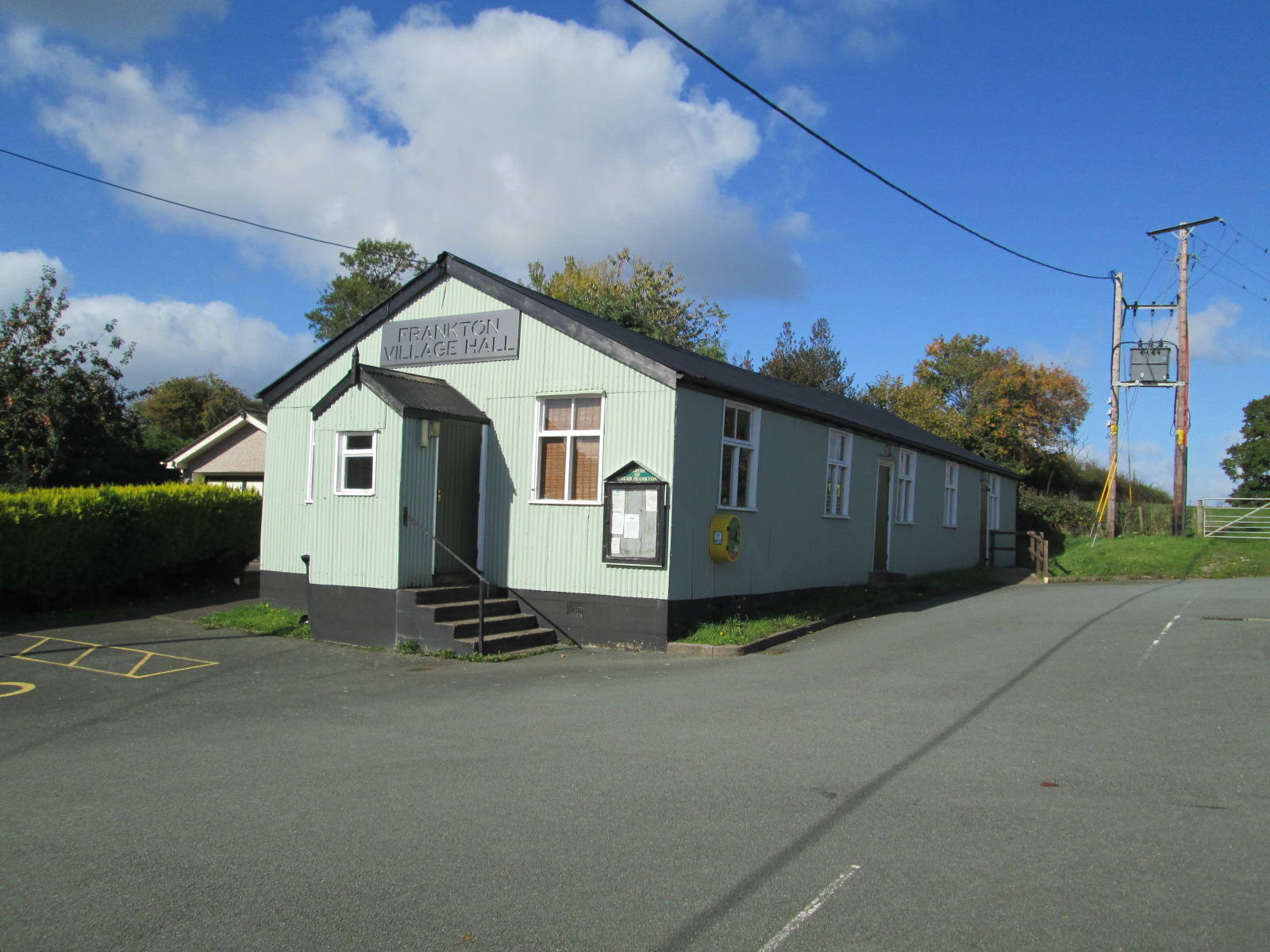
The village hall

Welsh Frankton is one of four wards of the Ellesmere Rural Parish Council area, and elects two of the twelve councillors in the council.

The village hall, built in the early 1930s, is alongside the church. It is run as a registered charity.

The Shropshire Union Canal runs through the parish. There was once a railway station, on the Cambrian Railways, which operated between 1867 and 1965.

=== St Andrew's Church ===
The church, designed by Edward Haycock in Early Decorated style, was built in 1857–58 on the site of a chapel of 1835. It was a chapel of ease until the parish of Welsh Frankton was created in 1865 from parts of those of Ellesmere and Whittington. The tower, with a broach spire, is in the south-west corner. The first incumbent was Oswald Moseley Feilden, who donated the marble reredos in 1870. He died in 1924, and the stained-glass east window was installed in his memory.

The village's war memorial consists of a stone shrine surmounted by a cross built into the churchyard wall on the side of the main road between Ellesmere and Oswestry, bearing a marble plaque listing those killed in the First World War, with two names from the Second World War below it. The churchyard contains the war grave of a King's Shropshire Light Infantry soldier of the First World War.

The church is part of a benefice with Criftins and Dudleston Churches.

=== Notable people ===
Future Victoria Cross recipient John Brunt (1922–1944) attended village school at Welsh Frankton before going up to Ellesmere College.

== See also ==
- Frankton Junction
- Listed buildings in Ellesmere Rural
