= Fenn's Bank railway station =

Disused railway station

Fenn's Bank
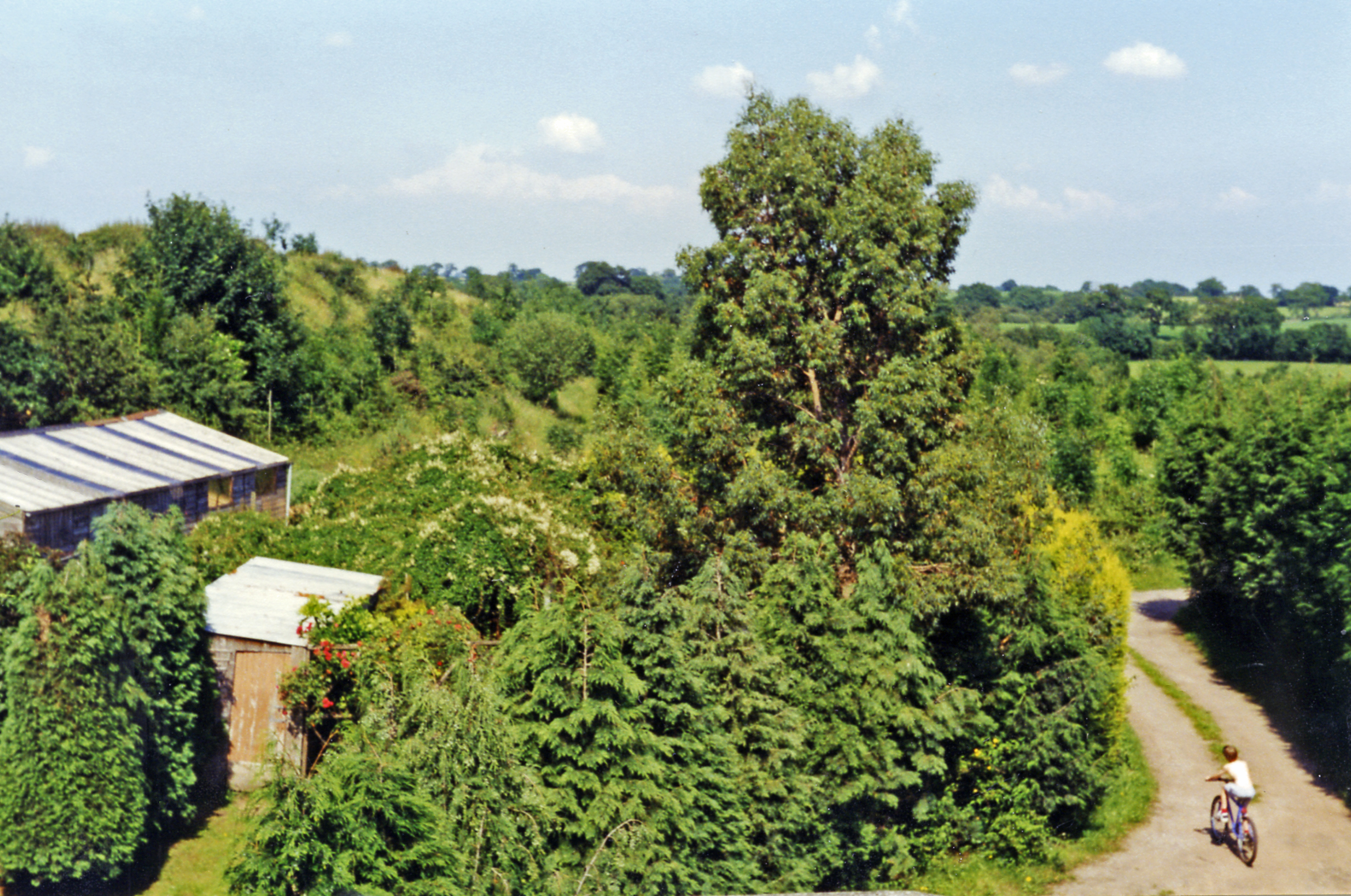
- The site of the station in 1997

General information
- Location: Bronington, Wrexham County Borough; Wales
- Coordinates: 52.9469°N 2.7316°W
- Grid reference: SJ510392
- Platforms: 1

Other information
- Status: Disused

History
- Opened: 4 May 1863
- Closed: 18 January 1965
- Original company: Oswestry, Ellesmere and Whitchurch Railway
- Pre-grouping: Cambrian Railways
- Post-grouping: Great Western Railway
Location

Fenn's Bank railway station was a station in Bronington, Wrexham, Wales. The station was opened on 4 May 1863 and closed on 18 January 1965.

== Details ==
The station was situated on the edge of Fenn's Moss, now part of the Fenn's, Whixall and Bettisfield Mosses National Nature Reserve. The formation runs from south-west to north-east, and a bridge carried a minor road across the tracks immediately to the west of the station. There was a single platform to the north of the tracks, with a single storey building on the platform. In 1893, there was a passing loop, which was only used by goods trains, and a siding to serve a goods yard. The passing loop continued through the bridge to the south-west, to serve a brickyard and kiln. By 1899, a second siding had been laid into the goods yard, and the northern end of the passing loop had been continued along an embankment as a siding. It ran alongside the main line almost to the point at which is crossed the Shropshire Union Canal. At the southern end, a new clay pit had been opened on the north side of the main line, which was connected to Fenn's Brick and Tile Works by a short section of track that passed under the main line. The buildings had been extended, and there was a balloon loop around a circular structure. An extra siding turned off the line to the Brick Works, and entered a transshipment shed, which also accommodated a 2 ft (610 mm) gauge line bringing peat from Fenn's and Whixall Mosses. The tramway was operated by the Peat Moss Litter Company. The layout in 1912 was similar, except that the balloon loop had been split into two sidings, one on either side of the circular structure.

== Bibliography ==
- Jenkins, Stanley C; Loader, Martin (2015). The Great Western Railway Volume 5: Shrewsbury to Pwllheli. Amberley Publishing. ISBN 978-1-4456-4286-4.
- Mitchell, Vic; Smith, Keith (2010). Oswestry to Whitchurch. Middleton Press. figs. 51-54. ISBN 978-1-906008-81-9. OCLC 751631667.

Preceding station	Disused railways	Following station
Bettisfield; Line and station closed	Cambrian Railways; Oswestry, Ellesmere and Whitchurch Railway	Whitchurch (Shropshire); Line closed, station open
