= Frankton railway station =

Disused railway station in Shropshire, England

Frankton
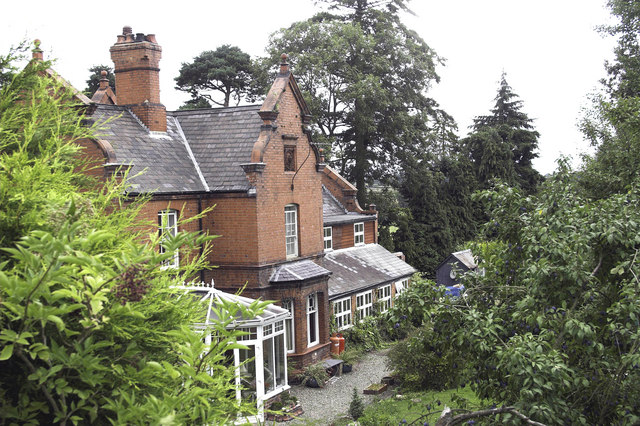
- The site of the station in 2006

General information
- Location: Ellesmere Rural, Shropshire; England
- Coordinates: 52.9042°N 2.9456°W
- Grid reference: SJ365346
- Platforms: 1

Other information
- Status: Disused

History
- Original company: Cambrian Railways
- Pre-grouping: Cambrian Railways
- Post-grouping: Great Western Railway

Key dates
- January 1867: Opened
- 18 January 1965: Closed
Location

Frankton railway station was a station in Ellesmere Rural, Shropshire, England. The station was opened in 1867 and closed on 18 January 1965.

Preceding station	Disused railways	Following station
Whittington High Level; Line and station closed	Cambrian Railways; Oswestry, Ellesmere and Whitchurch Railway	Ellesmere; Line and station closed
