= Stanwardine Halt railway station =

Disused railway station in Shropshire, England

Stanwardine Halt

General information
- Location: Stanwardine-in-the-Fields, Shropshire; England
- Coordinates: 52.8111°N 2.8704°W
- Grid reference: SJ413241
- Platforms: 2

Other information
- Status: Disused

History
- Original company: Great Western Railway

Key dates
- 27 February 1933: Station opens
- 12 September 1960: Station closed
Location

Stanwardine Halt was a minor station located north of Shrewsbury on the GWR's Paddington to Birkenhead main line. It was opened in the 1930s as part of the GWR's halt construction programme, aimed at combatting growing competition from bus services. Today the route is part of the Shrewsbury to Chester line. Nothing now remains on the site.

== Historical services ==
Express trains did not call at Stanwardine Halt, only local services. No freight or parcels traffic was handled here.

== Neighbouring stations ==
Preceding station	Historical railways	Following station
Baschurch	Great Western Railway; Shrewsbury to Chester Line	Haughton Halt
