= Dudleston Heath =

Village in Shropshire, England

Coordinates: 52.924°N 2.940°W

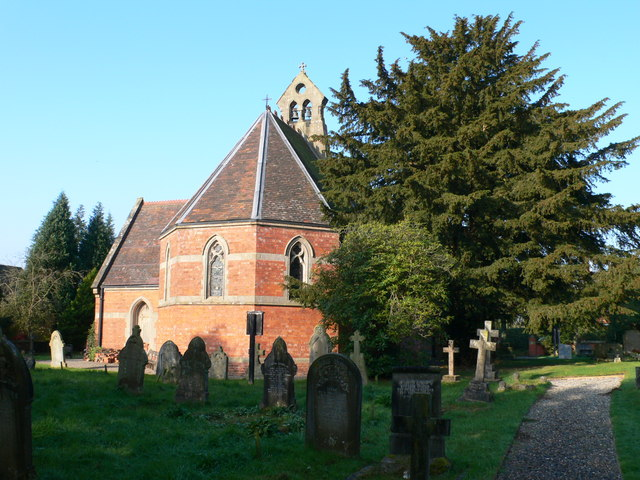
- St Matthews Parish Church, Criftins

- Location within Shropshire
- OS grid reference: SJ368367
- Civil parish: Ellesmere Rural
- Unitary authority: Shropshire
- Ceremonial county: Shropshire
- Region: West Midlands
- Country: England
- Sovereign state: United Kingdom
- Post town: ELLESMERE
- Postcode district: SY12
- Dialling code: 01691
- Police: West Mercia
- Fire: Shropshire
- Ambulance: West Midlands
- UK Parliament: North Shropshire

Dudleston Heath (also referred to as Criftins) is a village in north-west Shropshire, England. It is located on the B5068 road between Ellesmere and St Martin's and is part of Ellesmere Rural civil parish. The Wales-England border is just to the north.

== Activities ==
The village has a village hall which hosts regular events such as coffee mornings, open days and other fund raising activities. These are arranged by the Events Committee. There are also regular user groups such as the Women's Institute, senior citizens and bingo as well as card playing groups. There is also a franchised pub called the 'Parish Pump'. The hall possesses facilities for snooker, tennis and crown green bowls, as well as having a football pitch and beautiful allotments which are an asset to the community. The Parish Pump pub and hall have in the past played host to a small country music festival and a village fete.

The village has a football team of the same name which plays in Shrewsbury Sunday League.

== Industry ==
The village consists of a local post office (now situated inside the Parish Hall), and a working men's club, in addition to the Parish Hall. The main source of income in the area is farming which provides jobs for many people of the local area. The reason for the high amount of farming is that the majority of land in the area is taken up by fields and the high clay content in the ground provides minerals for the growth of crops. Others from the community commute to nearby towns such as Ellesmere, Oswestry or Shrewsbury as the village is served by the 53 bus route stopping outside the Parish Hall.

== Church ==
The village's Church of England parish church of St Matthew is beside the road from Ellesmere to St Martin's. The churchyard contains the village's war memorial, a red stone cross unveiled in 1921, remains of a Saxon preaching cross, and a yew tree with a girth of 20 ft and thought (in 2013) to be over 1,000 years old. Indoors is a Roll of Honour and framed list of local men who were on active service in World War I.

== Education ==
The village also has a primary school, which has been expanded over the years. Many of its pupils then go on to Lakelands Academy in Ellesmere travelling on the 53 bus.

== Notable people ==
- William Fletcher (priest), (1851/1852–1926), later Archdeacon of Wrexham, was Vicar of Criftins 1878–1882.
- The family of Charles de Gaulle, (1890–1970), lived in the village at Gadlas Hall (now a residential care home) during their exile from France in World War II. They rented the house between August 1940 and autumn of 1941, from its owner, judge Francis Taylor, 1st Baron Maenan.
- British showjumper, Nick Skelton, born 1957, owned stables in the area.
- Welsh judoka, Luke Preston, born 1976, grew up in the village and attended Criftins CofE school for primary education.
- Kieran Davies – former Gibraltar lacrosse captain

== See also ==
- Listed buildings in Ellesmere Rural
