= Welshampton railway station =

Disused railway station in Shropshire, England

Welshampton

General information
- Location: Welshampton, Shropshire; England
- Coordinates: 52.9154°N 2.8347°W
- Grid reference: SJ439357
- Platforms: 1

Other information
- Status: Disused

History
- Original company: Oswestry, Ellesmere and Whitchurch Railway
- Pre-grouping: Cambrian Railways
- Post-grouping: Great Western Railway

Key dates
- 4 May 1863: Opened
- 18 January 1965: Closed
Location

Welshampton railway station was a station in Welshampton, Shropshire, England. The station was opened on 4 May 1863 and closed on 18 January 1965.

The station's facilities and single platform were located on the north side, despite this being further from both Welshampton and the nearest road.

== See also ==
- Welshampton rail crash

Preceding station	Disused railways	Following station
Ellesmere; Line and station closed	Cambrian Railways; Oswestry, Ellesmere and Whitchurch Railway	Bettisfield; Line and station closed
