= Tinkers Green Halt railway station =

Former railway station in England

Tinkers Green Halt

General information
- Location: Oswestry, Shropshire; England
- Coordinates: 52.8699°N 3.0283°W
- Grid reference: SJ308307
- Platforms: 1

Other information
- Status: Disused

History
- Original company: Great Western Railway
- Post-grouping: Great Western Railway

Key dates
- 16 October 1939: Opened
- 18 January 1965: Closed
Location

Tinkers Green Halt railway station was a station in Oswestry, Shropshire, England. The station was opened on 16 October 1939 and closed on 18 January 1965.

Preceding station	Disused railways	Following station
Oswestry; Line and station closed	Great Western Railway; Oswestry, Ellesmere and Whitchurch Railway	Whittington High Level; Line and station closed
