= Whittington High Level railway station =

Disused railway station in Shropshire, England

Whittington High Level

General information
- Location: Whittington, Shropshire; England
- Coordinates: 52.8758°N 3.0091°W
- Grid reference: SJ322313
- Platforms: 2

Other information
- Status: Disused

History
- Original company: Cambrian Railways
- Pre-grouping: Cambrian Railways
- Post-grouping: GWR; Western Region of British Railways

Key dates
- 27 July 1864: Station opened as "Whittington"
- 1 Jul 1924: Renamed "Whittington High Level"
- October 1937: Closed to goods
- 4 January 1960: Closed completely
- 1963: Line transferred to London Midland Region of British Railways
- 18 January 1965: Line closed
Location

Whittington High Level railway station is one of two former railway stations in the village of Whittington, Shropshire, England.

== History ==
Whittington High Level railway station was opened as plain "Whittington" by the Cambrian Railways, on their single-track Oswestry to Whitchurch line. The Oswestry, Ellesmere and Whitchurch Railway were in the process of building the station when the company was absorbed into the newly created Cambrian Railways in 1864. The Cambrian itself was incorporated into the GWR at the grouping of 1923. In 1948 both of Whittington's lines and stations became part of the Western Region of British Railways.

In 1924 the two "Whittington" stations in the village were renamed. This station gained the suffix "High Level" and its neighbour on the GWR's Paddington to Birkenhead main line became Whittington Low Level.

The line was generally single track with passing loops, one of which was at Whittington High Level station, which was on an embankment. The platforms, station buildings and signalbox were made of wood. The station was damaged by fire in 1958.

The line and station have been demolished.

== Passenger services ==
In 1922 passenger services calling at Whittington High Level were at their most intensive, with trains serving several long-distance destinations as well as locals plying between Whitchurch and Oswestry:

- On Sundays just one Down train called:
  - the overnight Euston to Aberystwyth via Whitchurch departed from Whittington High Level at 03:15. Passengers for Aberystwyth would have ample opportunity to catch up on their sleep as it did not arrive there until 09:25. The return left Aberystwyth at 18:10, arriving at Whittington at 21:28.
- On Mondays to Saturdays seven Down trains called:
  - three through trains to Aberystwyth, one of which contained through carriages from Paddington.
  - two locals to Oswestry, plus one "Motor Car" service; whether this was on road or rail is unclear
  - one stopping service to Welshpool
  - these were all balanced by Up workings.

Preceding station	Historical railways	Following station
Tinkers Green Halt; Line and station closed	Cambrian Railways; Oswestry, Ellesmere and Whitchurch Railway	Frankton; Line and station closed
