= Haughton Halt railway station =

Disused railway station in Shropshire, England

Haughton Halt

General information
- Location: Haughton, Shropshire; England
- Coordinates: 52.8327°N 2.9246°W
- Grid reference: SJ377265
- Platforms: 2

Other information
- Status: Disused

History
- Original company: Great Western Railway

Key dates
- 22 December 1934: Station opens
- 12 September 1960: Station closed
Location

Haughton Halt was a minor station located north of Shrewsbury on the GWR's Paddington to Birkenhead main line. It was opened in the nineteen thirties as part of the GWR's halt construction programme, aimed at combatting growing competition from bus services and would primarily have served the adjacent (and now disused) Haughton Airfield. Today the route is part of the Shrewsbury to Chester line. Nothing now remains on the site.

== Historical services ==
Express trains did not call at Haughton Halt, only local services. No freight or parcels traffic was handled here.

== Neighbouring stations ==
Preceding station	Historical railways	Following station
Stanwardine Halt	Great Western Railway; Shrewsbury to Chester Line	Rednal and West Felton
