= Listed buildings in Ellesmere Rural =

Ellesmere Rural is a civil parish in Shropshire, England. It contains 75 listed buildings that are recorded in the National Heritage List for England. Of these, eleven are at Grade II*, the middle of the three grades, and the others are at Grade II, the lowest grade. The parish is mainly to the south, the west, and the northwest of the town of Ellesmere. It contains a number of villages and smaller settlements, but is almost entirely rural.

Most of the listed buildings are houses, cottages, farmhouses and farm buildings, and many of these are timber framed, dating from the 15th, 16th and 17th centuries. The Llangollen Canal runs through the parish, and many structures associated with this are listed, including bridges and a lock. To the southeast of the town of Ellesmere is the maintenance yard of the canal, which is "the best-preserved canal workshop site in Britain", and which contains four Grade II* listed buildings. The other listed buildings include churches, one with a medieval cross in the churchyard, a country house and associated structures, a road bridge, a milestone, and a telephone kiosk.

== Key ==
| Grade | Criteria |
|---|---|
| II* | Particularly important buildings of more than special interest |
| II | Buildings of national importance and special interest |

== Buildings ==
| Name and location | Photograph | Date | Notes | Grade |
|---|---|---|---|---|
| St Mary's Church, Dudleston; 52.93925°N 2.97452°W | | Medieval | The church was enlarged in 1819 with the addition of aisles, a chancel and a tower. The chancel was lengthened in 1877, and the church was restored in 1884–90. The church is in sandstone with a tiled roof, and consists of a nave, north and south aisles, north and south transepts, a chancel with a north vestry and organ chamber, and a west tower. The tower has two stages, diagonal buttresses, an octagonal top stage, a clock face, a moulded cornice, an embattled parapet with crocketed corner pinnacles, and a pyramidal roof with a ball finial and a weathervane. | II |
| Churchyard cross 52.93915°N 2.97446°W | | 14th or 15th century (probable) | The cross is in the churchyard of St Mary's Church, Dudleston. It is in sandstone, and consists of a weathered octagonal shaft on a square plinth with a base of two octagonal steps. The cross is also a Scheduled Monument. | II |
| Barn, Lower House Farm; 52.89485°N 2.95545°W | — | 14th or 15th century | A barn, later used for other purposes, it is of cruck construction, and has been remodelled with the wall rebuilt in brick. It has a single storey, and contains two true cruck trusses. | II |
| New Hall; 52.92293°N 2.97217°W | — | 14th or 15th century | A farmhouse, basically timber framed, encased in roughcast brick with a slate roof. Originally a hall range with four or five bays, a cross-wing was added to the left in the 17th century, and later additions were a twin-gabled wing at the rear, and a gabled wing projecting to the right. There are two storeys, and the windows are a mix of sashes and casements, all with segmental heads. | II |
| Old Groves; 52.93219°N 2.92413°W | — | 15th century (probable) | A cottage that was remodelled and extended in the 17th century, it is timber framed with cruck construction, encased in brick, the right gable end rendered, and with a slate roof. It has one storey and an attic, and two bays. The windows are casements, and there are two gabled eaves dormers. | II |
| Sodylt Old Hall; 52.95900°N 2.97682°W | | 15th century | The farmhouse is timber framed with cruck construction, and has infill and rebuilding in red brick, and a slate roof. Originally a hall house, cross-wings were added in the 16th century. The hall range has one storey and an attic, and the cross-wings have two storeys. The gables and upper floors of the cross-wings are jettied with chamfered bressumers. The windows are casements, and in the hall range is a gabled eaves dormer. At the rear of the hall range is a full-length outshut, and to the right of the right cross-wing is a lean-to. Inside the house are two true cruck trusses. | II* |
| Vron Farmhouse; 52.93904°N 2.98880°W | — | 15th century | The farmhouse is basically timber framed with cruck construction, and has been encased and rebuilt in red brick with a slate roof. There is one storey and an attic, and three bays. The windows are casements and there are three gabled dormers on the front. Inside are two true cruck trusses, and timber-framed cross-walls. | II |
| Lee Old Hall; 52.88604°N 2.88829°W | | c. 1550 | The house was extended in 1594, in 1651, and in the 19th century. It is timber framed with rendered and brick infill and has slate roofs. There are two storeys and attics, and a basic L-shaped plan with a two-bay range, and a two-bay cross-wing. There is a two-storey porch with a jettied upper floor and attic with moulded bressumers. Some windows are mullioned, some are mullioned and transomed, and others are casements. | II* |
| Dick Whittington's Cottage; 52.90246°N 2.91819°W | — | Mid to late 16th century | A timber framed cottage with cruck construction, infill and rebuilding in red brick, and with a corrugated iron roof over thatch. It has one storey and an attic, and two bays. The windows are casements, and there is a gabled eaves dormer. Inside are two true cruck trusses, and a partly infilled inglenook fireplace. | II |
| Old Hall and wall 52.89848°N 2.97278°W | — | Mid to late 16th century | The farmhouse was later extended and altered. It is timber framed with brick infill, partly rendered, on a sandstone plinth and with a slate roof. There are two storeys and attics, and a T-shaped plan, consisting of a three-bay hall range and a two-bay cross-wing, and at the rear are two lean-tos. On the front is a two-storey porch. The upper floor and front gable of the cross-wing and porch are jettied with moulded bressumers. The windows are casements, and inside the hall is an inglenook fireplace. Attached to the hall is a brick wall with moulded stone coping enclosing the garden. | II* |
| Criftins Farmhouse; 52.91773°N 2.96991°W | — | Early 17th century | The farmhouse is timber framed with red brick infill, clad or rebuilt in brick at the front and gable ends, and with a slate roof. There are two storeys and an attic, and three bays. On the front is a gabled porch, and the windows are casements, those in the ground floor with segmental heads. | II |
| Oak House; 52.88794°N 2.94547°W | — | Early 17th century | A timber framed farmhouse with brick infill, largely encased and rebuilt in brick, and with slate roofs. There are two storeys, and an L-shaped plan, consisting of a hall range with a dentilled eaves cornice, and a gabled cross-wing projecting to the right. There is a porch with doorway with an open pediment in the angle, and a doorway with a fanlight. The windows are a mix of casements and sashes. At the rear are 19th-century extensions. | II |
| Broad Oak Cottage; 52.87983°N 2.93569°W | — | Mid 17th century | The cottage was altered later. It is timber framed with rendered infill on a red brick plinth and has a slate roof. There are two storeys and two bays. It has a gabled porch, and the windows are casements. | II |
| Former farmhouse at N.G.R. SJ 4142 3679; 52.92543°N 2.87284°W | | Mid 17th century | The building was later extended and altered. The original part is timber framed with a red brick infill on a plinth, the extensions are in red brick, and the roof is slated. The left gable end is slate-hung. There are two storeys and a cellar, four timber-framed bays on the right, an extension to the left in brick, and rear extensions. On the front is a gabled brick porch, and the windows are casements. | II |
| Old Hardwick Farmhouse; 52.90343°N 2.94064°W | — | 17th century (probable) | The farmhouse was altered and extended in the 19th century. The earlier part is timber framed and roughcast, the later part is in red brick, and the roof is slated and has plain bargeboards. The house originally had an L-shaped plan, consisting of a hall and cross-wing, and the additions consisted of a narrower cross-wing and a gabled extension to the rear. In the hall range is one storey and an attic, and in the cross-wings are two storeys. On the cross-wings are canted bay windows, the other windows are sashes, there is a porch in the angle, and a gabled eaves dormer. | II |
| Three Ways; 52.88819°N 2.90824°W | — | Mid 17th century | A timber framed cottage with brick infill on a rendered plinth, with a thatched roof. It has one storey and an attic, two bays, and brick lean-tos on the left and at the rear. The windows are casements, and there is a gabled eaves dormer. | II |
| Pentre Morgan; 52.92676°N 2.98403°W | | 1664 | A farmhouse in red brick on a chamfered plinth with stone coping, with rusticated quoins, a band, and a slate roof with coped verges and a ball finial. There are two storeys, an attic and a cellar, a symmetrical front of five bays, the middle bay recessed, and a single-storey extension to the right. The central doorway has a bracketed flat stone hood, and the windows are small-paned with keystones, some with sashes. In the gable ends are oeil-de-boeuf windows lighting the attic, and in the left gable end are mullioned windows lighting the cellar. | II* |
| Frankton Farmhouse and Cottage; 52.88251°N 2.94471°W | — | Mid to late 17th century | The farmhouse is timber framed and has infill in brick, partly rendered, it was later encased or rebuilt in brick at the rear, and has slate roofs. The farmhouse consists of a hall range of three bays, and a two-bay cross-wing. There are two storeys, some windows are casements, some are fixed, and at the rear are horizontally-sliding sash windows. Projecting from the hall range is a two-storey brick range forming the cottage. | II |
| Lee Farmhouse; 52.88631°N 2.88567°W | — | Mid to late 17th century (probable) | The farmhouse was extended and altered in the 19th century. The original part is timber framed and roughcast, the later parts are in red brick, and the roofs are slated. There are two storeys and an attic, and a short central range, flanked by two gabled ranges, the left range projecting. The windows are casements, and to the right is a roughcast outbuilding with a pyramidal roof and a louvred lantern. | II |
| Plas-yn-y-coed; 52.95664°N 2.99446°W | — | Mid to late 17th century (probable) | A farmhouse that was later extended. It is in brick, partly rendered, with probably a timber framed core, on a sandstone plinth, and with a slate roof. There is one storey and an attic, the original part has three bays, and there is a later gabled extension to the left. The windows are casements, and there are two gabled eaves dormers. | II |
| Cottage southwest of Plas Yolyn; 52.93348°N 2.97224°W | — | Mid to late 17th century | The cottage is timber framed with brick infill on a plinth of sandstone and brick, and with a slate roof. There is one storey and an attic, and an L-shaped plan, with a long rear wing. Over the door is a rectangular fanlight, the windows are casements, and above the eaves is a hip-roofed hatch. | II |
| Barn southeast of Sodylt Old Hall; 52.95881°N 2.97649°W | — | Mid to late 17th century | The barn is timber framed with weatherboarding on a sandstone plinth, the gable end facing the road is iron-clad, and it has a corrugated iron roof. The barn contains a central threshing entrance and an eaves hatch to the right. | II |
| Barn, Caia Farm; 52.93217°N 2.98440°W | — | Late 17th century | The barn is partly timber framed with weatherboarding, and partly in brick, and has a corrugated iron roof over thatch. There are seven bays, and it contains doorways and eaves hatches. | II |
| Greenwood Cottage; 52.89214°N 2.87559°W | — | Late 17th century | The cottage was later extended. It is timber framed with brick infill on a plinth, and has a slate roof. There is one storey and an attic, and one bay with an extension to the right. It contains a casement window and a gabled eaves dormer. | II |
| Lee New Farmhouse; 52.88154°N 2.87630°W | — | Late 17th century | The farmhouse was later extended. The original part is timber framed with brick infill, the extensions are in brick painted to resemble timber framing, and the roof is slated. There is one storey and an attic, and three bays. On the front is a gabled brick porch and a doorway with a semicircular fanlight, and the windows are casements. | II |
| Oak House Farmhouse; 52.87803°N 2.90456°W | — | Late 17th century | The farmhouse was later altered and extended. The original part is timber framed with infill and cladding in red brick, on a plinth, the left gable end is in red brick, and the roof is in slate. There is one storey and an attic, three bays, and two outshuts at the rear. The windows are casements, and there is one gabled eaves dormer. | II |
| Barn northeast of Old Hall; 52.89875°N 2.97215°W | — | Late 17th century | The barn is in red brick with a slate roof, and has two levels. In the ground floor are six openings, five of which have segmental heads. Above are two eaves hatches, and a wooden mullion window. | II |
| Plas Warren Hall; 52.94315°N 2.98613°W | | Late 17th century | A manor house, later a farmhouse, basically timber framed on a sandstone plinth, later mainly encased in brick, and extended. It has a slate roof, and an H-shaped plan, consisting of a hall range with three bays, and gabled two-bay cross-wings. There are two storeys and attics, a central gabled porch, and segmental-headed cross-windows. Inside the hall are timber-framed cross-walls and an inglenook fireplace. | II |
| Cottage west of Plas Warren Hall; 52.94325°N 2.98680°W | — | Late 17th century | The cottage is timber framed with red brick infill and a slate roof. There is one storey and an attic, two bays, and a former byre to the left. The windows are casements, and there are two gabled eaves dormers. | II |
| Barn southeast of Plas-yn-y-coed; 52.95649°N 2.99420°W | — | Late 17th century | The barn is timber framed with weatherboarding on a plinth, and has a corrugated iron roof. There are seven bays, doorways, and four eaves hatches. | II |
| The Laurels; 52.88556°N 2.88639°W | — | Late 17th century | The former farmhouse possibly incorporates earlier material, and it was later extended and altered. The main part is in red brick, the rear range is timber framed with red brick infill, and the roofs are slated. There are two storeys and an attic, an L-shaped plan, and to the left is a single-storey range. On the front is a gabled brick porch with barleysugar balusters, coped verges, and a Tudor arched opening. The windows are casements, and in the roof is a gabled dormer with cusped bargeboards and a pointed finial. | II |
| The Smithy; 52.88614°N 2.88607°W | — | Late 17th century (probable) | A cottage and former smithy in roughcast red brick, probably originally timber framed, with a slate roof. It has one storey and an attic, and two bays, the right bay projecting and gabled. The doorway has a gabled hood, and the windows are casements. | II |
| Willowbank; 52.89619°N 2.95066°W | — | Late 17th century | A timber framed cottage with brick infill on a plinth, and with a slate roof. It has one storey and an attic, two bays, an early 19th-century single-storey timber-framed extension to the left, and a late 19th-century brick lean-to on the right. The windows are casements. | II |
| Pentre Madoc; 52.92235°N 2.97579°W | — | 1682 | The farmhouse was remodelled in the 18th century and later extended. It is in red brick with a roof partly tiled and partly slated. There are two storeys and an attic, a T-shaped plan with a front block of three bays and a rear wing. In the centre is a gabled timber porch, and the windows are sashes with segmental heads. | II |
| Outbuilding northwest of Sodylt Old Hall; 52.95910°N 2.97707°W | — | 1719 | The front of the outbuilding was partly rebuilt in the early 19th century. It is in red brick on a red sandstone plinth, and has a slate roof. There are doorways and windows with segmental heads and a datestone. Inside are timber framed cross-walls and an inglenook fireplace. | II |
| Hardwick Hall and balustraded terraces 52.90195°N 2.92965°W | — | c. 1720–30 | A country house in red brick with some facing in sandstone, a parapet, and a hipped slate roof. The main range has a rectangular plan, with semicircular walls linking with a stable block on the left and a service wing on the right. There are three storeys, a front of seven bays, with rusticated quoins, Corinthian pilasters, a central pediment, floor bands, and a moulded eaves cornice. The windows are sashes in moulded architraves with projecting keystones, some with brick aprons. The central former doorway is flanked by Corinthian columns. | II* |
| Barn northeast of Lee Hall Farmhouse; 52.88576°N 2.88559°W | | Early 18th century | The barn is timber framed with red brick infill on a plinth, with a slate roof. It has an L-shaped plan, and contains various openings. | II |
| Barn west of Lee New Farmhouse; 52.88133°N 2.87666°W | — | Early 18th century (probable) | The barn is timber framed with red brick infill and some weatherboarding, and has a corrugated iron roof. There are two levels, and it has an L-shaped plan, with two ranges at right angles, each with brick lean-tos. Both ranges have stable doors and windows, and the longer range also has eaves hatches. | II |
| Barn west of The Laurels; 52.88533°N 2.88661°W | — | Early 18th century | The barn is timber framed with red brick infill and plinth, and it has a corrugated iron roof. There are two levels, five doors, and eaves hatches above. | II |
| The Tan House; 52.92778°N 2.93010°W | — | Early to mid 18th century | A farmhouse, later a private house, it is in red brick with a roughcast left gable end, a dentilled eaves cornice, and a slate roof. There are two storeys with an attic and cellar, three bays, and a single-storey extension to the left. On the front is an open gabled timber porch, most of the windows are sashes, there is a casement window in the extension, and in the roof are two hipped roof eaves dormers. Inside the house is an inglenook fireplace and timber framed walls. | II |
| Church Farmhouse; 52.93964°N 2.97434°W | — | Mid 18th century | The farmhouse is partly in brick and partly timber framed with brick infill on a sandstone plinth, and has slate roofs with coped verges. There is an L-shaped plan, the front brick range having two bays, the left gabled with two storeys, and the right bay with one storey and an attic. At the rear is a two-storey timber-framed wing. In the angle at the front is a lean-to porch, and the windows are casements. | II |
| Barn and archway southeast of Hardwick Hall; 52.90144°N 2.92894°W | — | Mid 18th century | The barn is in red brick, and has a roof of slate at the front, and corrugated iron at the rear. It has two storeys and an attic, and consists of two ranges at right angles. Some windows are sashes, some are fixed, and some are casements with segmental heads. To the left is a red brick wall containing a recessed round-headed archway. | II |
| Plas Yolyn; 52.93379°N 2.97189°W | — | Mid 18th century | A small country house that was later remodelled. It is in red brick with sandstone facing on the front, a stone modillion eaves cornice, a parapet, and hipped slate roofs. The front has five bays, the central three bays projecting with three storeys, and the outer bays with two storeys. In the centre is a Roman Doric portico with two pairs of fluted columns, and an open pediment with guttae. Above the door is a rectangular fanlight, and the windows are sashes. At the rear are twin gables with coped verges. | II* |
| Seven Sisters; 52.92278°N 2.90329°W | — | Mid 18th century | A farmhouse that was extended in the early 19th century, it is in red brick with a dentilled eaves cornice and a hipped slate roof. There are two storeys and an attic, a front of five bays, a full height rear range on the left, and a single-storey lean-to in the angle. One the front is an open gabled porch, the windows are sashes with segmental heads, and there are three hip-roofed eaves dormers. There is a tall window with a pointed head and Gothic tracery on the right. | II |
| Pit Farmhouse; 52.93779°N 2.95502°W | — | Mid to late 18th century | The farmhouse is in red brick with a moulded eaves cornice, a slate roof, and three storeys. It has an L-shaped plan, consisting of a three-bay main range, and a later rear wing. The central doorway is round-headed with a wreathed and radiating fanlight, and the windows are sashes, those in the lower two floors with wedge lintels. | II |
| Gazebo northeast of Seven Sisters; 52.92303°N 2.90250°W | — | Mid to late 18th century | The gazebo is in red brick, and has a pyramidal slate roof with a wooden finial. It has a polygonal plan, one storey, and a wide segmental-headed opening on the south. | II |
| Sodylt Hall; 52.95837°N 2.97549°W | — | Mid to late 18th century | The house is in roughcast red brick, with rusticated stone quoins, bands, a moulded parapet, and a double-span slate roof with stone coping. There are three storeys, three bays, and a two-storey flat-roofed extension to the right. In the centre is a flat-roofed porch with two arches, and the windows are sashes, with wedge lintels in the lower floors. | II |
| Gate, piers, steps, railings and ha-ha, Hardwick Hall; 52.90145°N 2.92996°W | — | Late 18th century | At the entrance to the drive three ramped steps lead up to ornamental cast iron gates and railings with openwork centres. The gate piers are in sandstone with a square plan and moulded capping. The drive is flanked by ha-ha sandstone walls stretching for about 45 metres (148 ft) on each side. | II |
| Grotto, Hardwick Hall; 52.90260°N 2.93480°W | — | Late 18th century (probable) | The grotto is a large structure in the grounds of the hall, and is in sandstone and quartzite. There are entrances on the east and the north, the latter having a pointed arch. Inside is a barrel vaulted room. | II |
| Kitchen garden wall, Hardwick Hall; 52.90286°N 2.93181°W | — | Late 18th century | The wall enclosing the kitchen garden is in red brick with sandstone coping and some slate. There are two sections, to the west is a roughly rectangular area, and to the east is a smaller triangular area. The eastern wall of the triangular area has a plinth and buttresses. | II |
| Rock Farmhouse; 52.94524°N 2.99995°W | — | Late 18th century | The farmhouse is in red brick with a dentil eaves cornice and a hipped slate roof. There are three storeys and three bays, the central bay containing a doorway with a rectangular fanlight and a pediment. The windows are casements with stone wedge lintels. | II |
| Bridge No. 60 (Stanks Bridge); 52.89758°N 2.90660°W | | c. 1797–1801 | An accommodation bridge over the Llangollen Canal, it is in red brick and consists of a single elliptical arch. The bridge has a string course, a stone-coped parapet and square corner piers. | II |
| Bridge No. 62 (Coachman's Bridge); 52.89069°N 2.91503°W | | c. 1797–1801 | The bridge carries Ellesmere Road over the Llangollen Canal. It is in red brick and consists of a single elliptical arch. The bridge has a string course, a stone-coped parapet, projecting keybricks, and square corner piers. | II |
| Bridge No. 63 (Clay Pit Bridge); 52.88763°N 2.91956°W | | c. 1797–1801 | An accommodation bridge over the Llangollen Canal, it is in red brick and consists of a single elliptical arch. The bridge has a string course, a stone-coped parapet, a projecting keybrick, and square corner piers. | II |
| Bridge No. 64; 52.88381°N 2.91421°W | | c. 1797–1801 | An accommodation bridge over the Llangollen Canal, it is in red brick and consists of a single elliptical arch. The bridge has a string course, a stone-coped parapet, projecting keybricks, and square corner piers. | II |
| Bridge No. 68 (Prices Bridge); 52.88043°N 2.93082°W | | c. 1797–1801 | An accommodation bridge over the Llangollen Canal, it is in red brick and consists of a single elliptical arch. The bridge has a string course, a stone-coped parapet, projecting keybricks, and square corner piers. | II |
| Cottage east of Bridge No. 62; 52.89069°N 2.91467°W | — | c. 1797–1801 | A canal worker's cottage, it is in red brick, and has a hipped slate roof. There are two storeys, a square plan, a lean-to at the rear, a segmental-headed casement window on each side, and a gabled timber porch. | II |
| Crickett Farmhouse; 52.90535°N 2.94669°W | — | c. 1800 | The farmhouse was extended in the late 19th century. It is in red brick with a moulded eaves cornice on the front, dentilled eaves cornices on the sides, and a hipped slate roof. The original part has three storeys and three bays, with the later wing recessed on the right, and with two storeys and two bays. The central doorway in the main range has an open pediment, and the windows are sashes, those in the lower floors with wedge lintels. | II |
| Bridge No. 70; 52.88077°N 2.93788°W | | c. 1801 | The bridge carries a road over the Llangollen Canal. It is in red brick and consists of a single elliptical arch. The bridge has a string course, and a stone-coped parapet ramped down at the ends. | II |
| Broom's Bridge; 52.88863°N 2.97389°W | | c. 1801 | An accommodation bridge over the Llangollen Canal, it is in brick and consists of a single elliptical arch. The bridge has a string course, a stone-coped parapet, and square corner piers. | II |
| Paddock Bridge No. 1; 52.88890°N 2.97630°W | | c. 1801 | An accommodation bridge over the Llangollen Canal, it is in brick and consists of a single elliptical arch. The bridge has a string course, a stone-coped parapet, and square corner piers. | II |
| Paddock Bridge No. 2; 52.88949°N 2.98390°W | | c. 1801 | An accommodation bridge over the Llangollen Canal, it is in red brick and consists of a single segmental arch. The bridge has a flat string course, a stone-coped parapet, a boarded trackway, and square corner piers. | II |
| Pollett's Bridge; 52.88777°N 2.96941°W | | c. 1801 | A roving bridge crossing the Llangollen Canal, it is in brick, and consists of a single elliptical arch. The bridge has ceramic and brick coping, a string course, and end piers on the west side. | II |
| New Marton Bottom Lock; 52.90078°N 2.99640°W | | c. 1801 | The lock is on the Llangollen Canal. It has blocks of limestone on the sides, and two sets of gates. | II |
| 1 Beech House, Canal Maintenance Yard; 52.90201°N 2.89235°W | — | c. 1806 | A cottage in the maintenance yard of the Llangollen Canal, it is in brick with a pyramidal slate roof. There are two storeys, a square plan, three bays, and a single-storey lean-to on the left. The central porch has a hipped roof, some windows are casements, others are horizontally-sliding sashes, and all have segmental heads. | II |
| 2–6 Beech House, Canal Maintenance Yard; 52.90246°N 2.89215°W | | 1806 | Originally offices for the Llangollen Canal in Italianate style, later converted into flats, the building is in red brick with a dentilled eaves cornice, and hipped slate roofs. There are two storeys, a main block with sides of three and two bays, a semicircular projection at the northwest corner, and service wings and outbuildings recessed on the left. In the centre is a doorway with a wreathed and radiating fanlight and a pediment, and the windows are sashes. | II* |
| Blacksmith's and joiner's shop, Canal Maintenance Yard; 52.90175°N 2.89290°W | | c. 1806 | The blacksmith's and joiner's shop in the maintenance yard of the Llangollen Canal are in sandstone with brick dressings, a dentilled eaves cornice, they are partly timber framed with weatherboarding, and have a roof partly of slate and partly of corrugated iron. The building contains doorways, windows of various types, external steps, and a walkway on the canal side. Most of the workshop fittings have been retained. | II* |
| Stables, stores, and dry dock, Canal Maintenance Yard; 52.90211°N 2.89263°W | | c. 1806 | The former stables and stores, with a dry dock at the southwest end, are in the maintenance yard of the Llangollen Canal. It consists of a long building in sandstone with a hipped slate roof and two storeys. The building contains doorways with segmental heads, and horizontally-sliding sash windows. At the southwest end is a round-headed arch giving access to the dry dock, and on the canal side is a lean-to on wooden posts. On the roof is a louvre with a weathervane in the shape of a narrow boat. | II* |
| Timber Store, Canal Maintenance Yard; 52.90171°N 2.89246°W | — | c. 1806 | The timber store in the maintenance yard of the Llangollen Canal is in sandstone with a wooden dentilled eaves cornice, the front is partly timber framed with weatherboarding and partly in brick, and it has a hipped asbestos sheet roof. There are two levels, four bays at the front are open, and it contains casement windows. To the right is a single-storey sawshop range, and to the left is a lean-to. The building formerly housed a steam engine. | II* |
| Barton's Bridge; 52.95583°N 2.96295°W | — | 1819 | The bridge carries the B5069 Road over the Shell Brook, on the border between England and Wales. It is in sandstone, and consists of one tall round-headed arch with high abutments. The bridge has rusticated voussoirs, a flat string course, a coped parapet, and rectangular corner piers at the ends. | II |
| The Lyth; 52.89697°N 2.87598°W | — | 1819 | A small country house in brick with a sill band, a hipped slate roof, and two storeys. The front has three wide bays, the central bay projecting forward, on the sides are four bays, and a trellised iron verandah extends the full length of the three fronts. There is a central doorway with a rectangular fanlight, and the windows are sashes. At the rear are lower service ranges around a square courtyard. | II* |
| Milestone; 52.92362°N 2.97705°W | — | Early to mid 19th century (probable) | The milestone is on the north side of the B5068 road. It is in limestone and has a rectangular section and a rounded top. The milestone carries a cast iron plate inscribed with the distance in miles to Ellesmere. | II |
| Shellbrook Hill; 52.95413°N 2.96651°W | | c. 1843 | A house in purple brick on a stone plinth with a band, four pilasters on the front, and a hipped slate roof. There are two storeys, the house has sides of three bays, and a service wing of four bays to the right. The entrance is round-headed with a recessed doorway and a semicircular fanlight. The windows are sashes, and on the left side and rear is an ornamental glass-canopied cast iron verandah. | II |
| St Andrew's Church, Welsh Frankton; 52.89200°N 2.94671°W | | 1857–58 | The church, designed by Edward Haycock junior in Decorated style, is in sandstone with tile roofs. It consists of a nave, a chancel, a northeast organ chamber and vestry, and a southwest tower. The tower contains a porch, it has three stages, gabled angle buttresses, a southwest stair turret, and a broach spire with lucarnes and a cross finial. | II |
| Telephone kiosk 52.88583°N 2.88584°W | | 1935 | A K6 type telephone kiosk, designed by Giles Gilbert Scott. Constructed in cast iron with a square plan and a dome, it has three unperforated crowns in the top panels. | II |
