= Smalley (excavator) =

Excavator

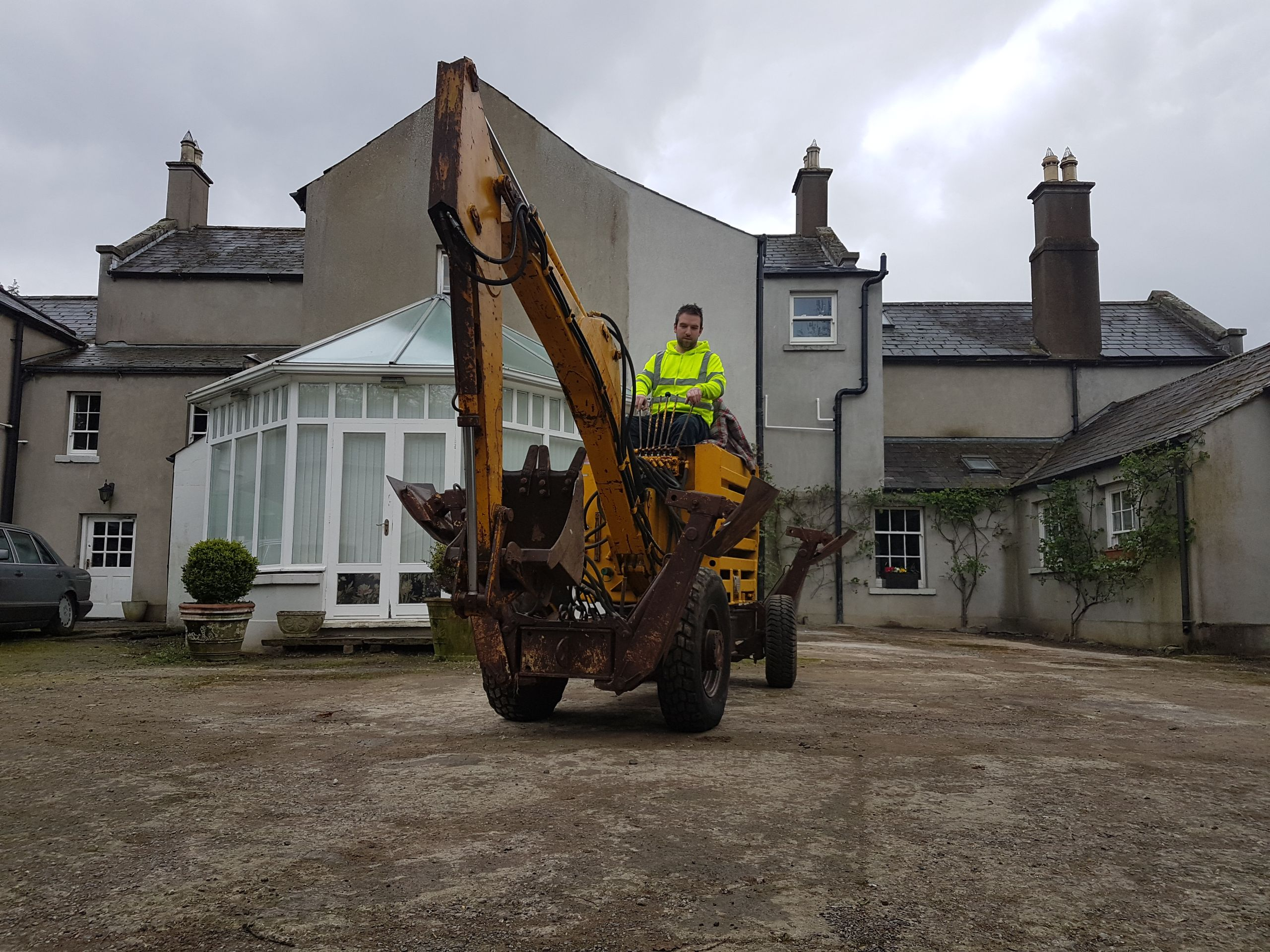
Smalley 425. 1977

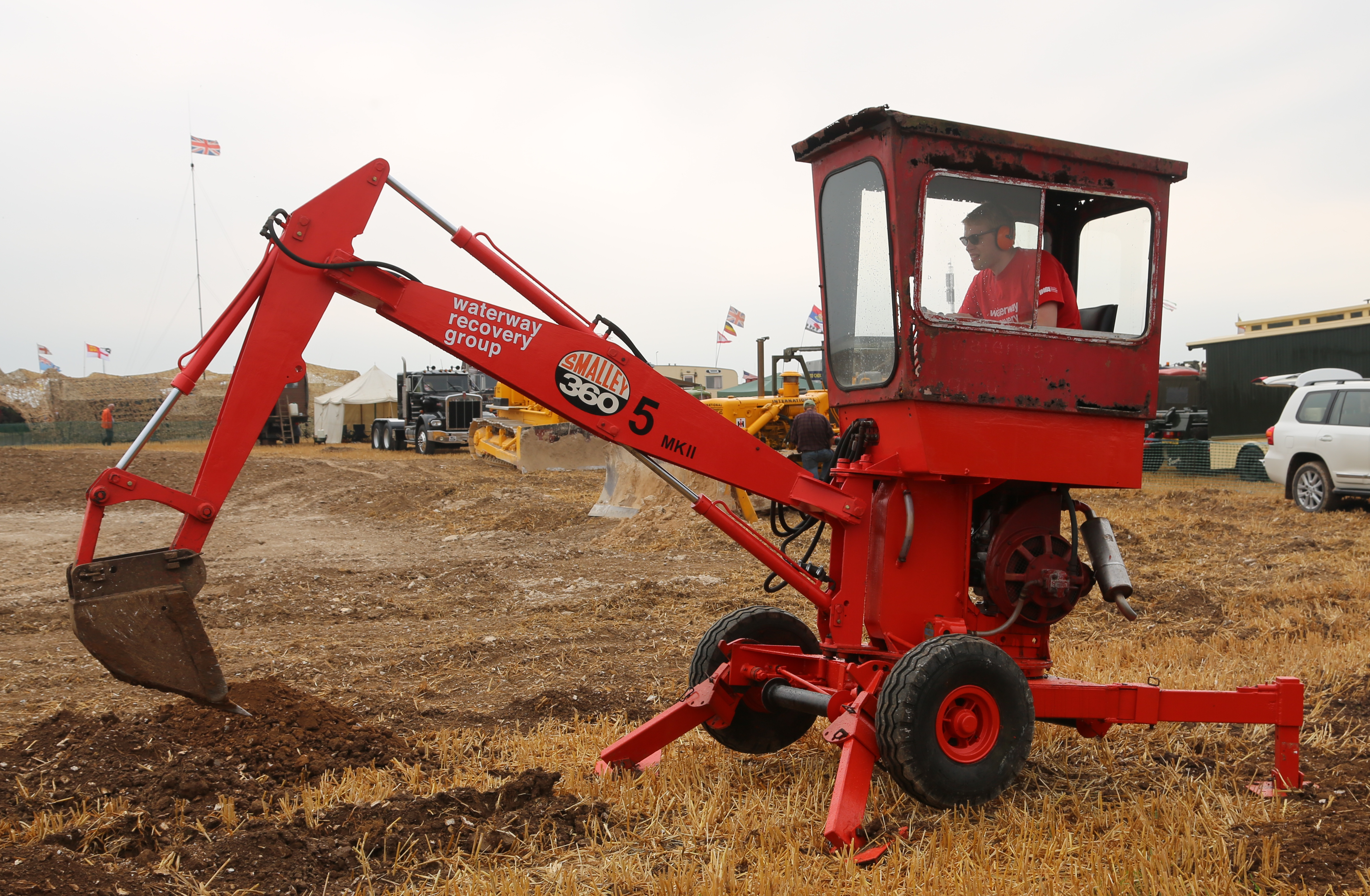
1971 Smalley 5 Mk II excavator

A smalley is a type of small excavator with two wheels on a single axle. It had no drive to the wheels, moving instead by pulling itself along using the excavator or 'backhoe' arm. Once in location the machine worked as any other 360° excavator, with two fixed-adjustable front legs, and two rear legs which could be mechanically height-adjusted from within the cab. For larger distances the machine could be towed on the road at moderate speeds using a suitable vehicle such as a Land Rover or large van.

Smalley evolved over the years and produced the Smalley 425 which has two drive wheels and two steering wheels. It uses a Lister Diesel engine, ST1. Single Cylinder, 6.5HP . 360 Degree turn, no electrics and manual start. Later models, which are still made today, use a different engine and have an alternator to power an electric starter motor. The 1977 needed the side support or else it would be too easy to tip over. (Note: The photo is missing the cab)

Richard Smalley is credited with being the inventor of the world’s first mini excavator in 1959, although now superseded by tracked derivations of the compact excavator at the concept was highly successful in allowing a compact and cost effective machine, with these 'walking' or 'tow-behind' excavators having been sold into more than forty countries throughout the world (including over 100 machines to Japan before 1968).

The manufacturer, Richard Smalley (Engineering) Ltd. was based in Osbournby near Sleaford in Lincolnshire, England.
