= Ellesmere Rural =

Civil parish in Shropshire, England

Coordinates: 52.914°N 2.93°W

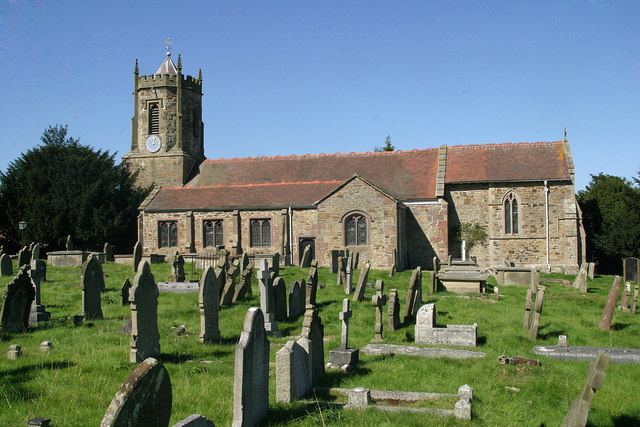
- Dudleston St Mary the Virgin church

- Location within Shropshire
- Population: 2,484 (2011 Census)
- Civil parish: Ellesmere Rural
- Unitary authority: Shropshire
- Ceremonial county: Shropshire
- Region: West Midlands
- Country: England
- Sovereign state: United Kingdom
- Post town: Ellesmere
- Postcode district: SY12
- Dialling code: 01691
- Police: West Mercia
- Fire: Shropshire
- Ambulance: West Midlands
- Website: www.ellesmererural-pc.gov.uk

Ellesmere Rural is a civil parish in Shropshire, England. In 2011 the parish had a population of 2484.

In 2011 the parish covered a large area, mainly to the west of the town of Ellesmere. This rural parish consists of farmland and a number of small settlements including Dudleston Heath (also known as Criftins), Dudleston, Elson, Tetchill and Welsh Frankton.

== History ==
In the 1610 translated edition of William Camden's Britannia, this area is described as

Ellesmer a little territorie but rich and fruitfull

Ellesemere Rural was created in 1894 when the civil functions of the larger ancient parish of Ellesmere were abolished and divided between this parish and the town of Ellsemere, which became a separate civil parish called Ellesmere Urban. Despite several changes to the parish boundary during the twentieth century the parish population has remained relatively stable since the 1930s.

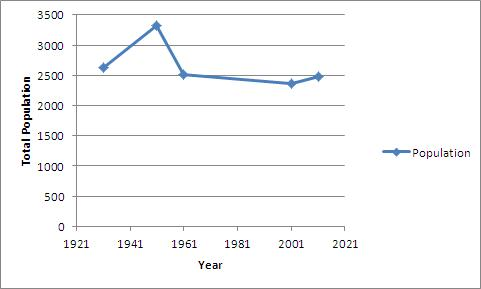
Population time series for Ellesmere Rural, Shropshire, 1931–2011

== See also ==
- Listed buildings in Ellesmere Rural
