= Rednal and West Felton railway station =

Disused railway station in Shropshire, England

Rednal & West Felton

General information
- Location: Rednal & West Felton, Shropshire; England
- Coordinates: 52.8413°N 2.9607°W
- Grid reference: SJ352275
- Platforms: 2

Other information
- Status: Disused

History
- Original company: Great Western Railway

Key dates
- 1848: Station opens as Rednal
- 16 Oct 1907: Re-named Rednal & West Felton
- 12 Sep 1960: Closed to passengers
- 7 Oct 1963: Closed to goods
Location

Rednal & West Felton railway station was a minor station on the GWR's Paddington to Birkenhead main line. Today, this is part of the Shrewsbury to Chester line. The distinctive red brick station building (now a private house) can still be seen on the west side of the line.

== History ==
Express trains did not call at Rednal & West Felton, only local services.

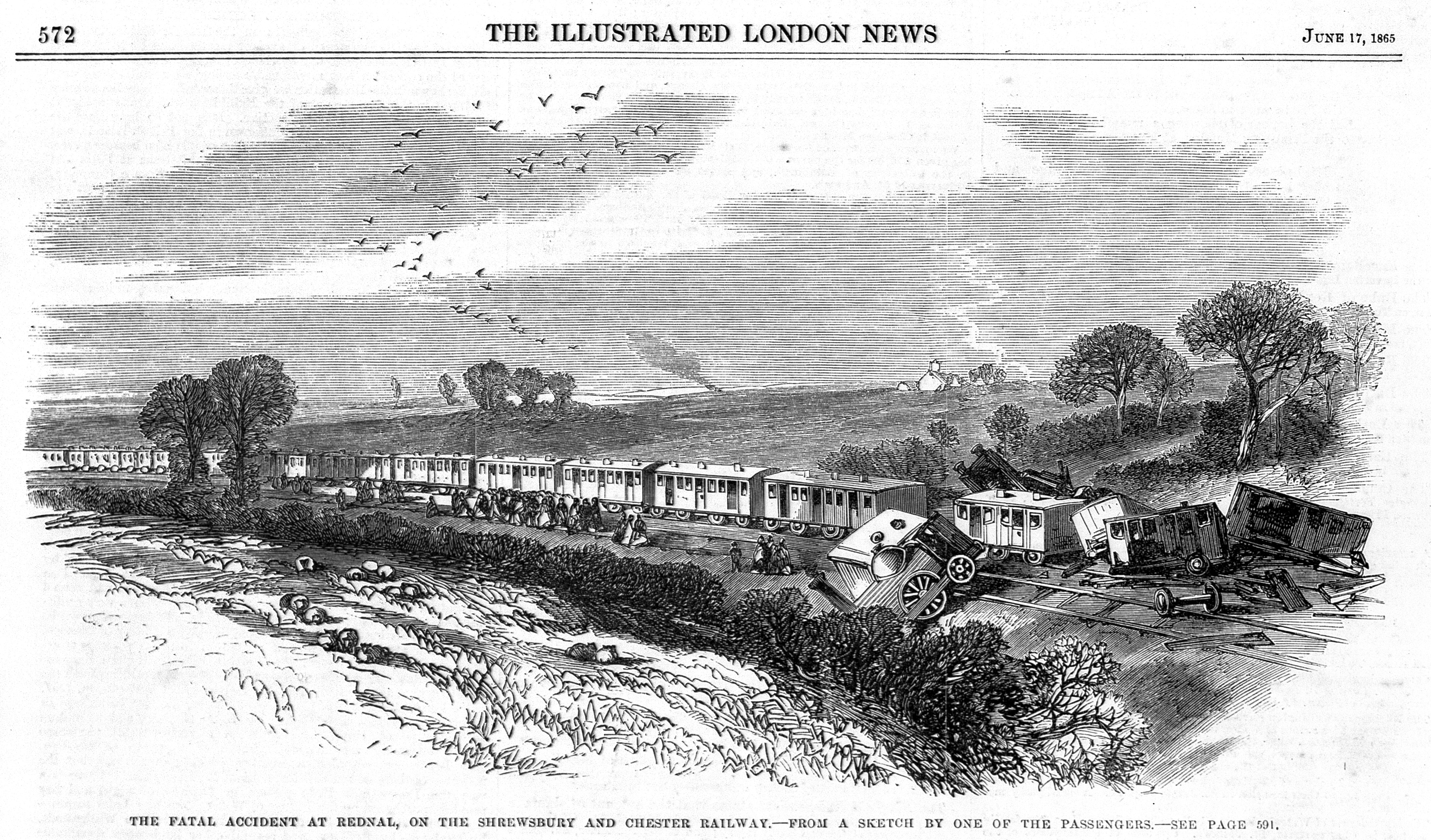
Fatal railway accident at Rednal, 1865

On 7 June 1865, it was the site of a rail crash which killed 13 and injured 30. The driver of a heavy excursion train from Birkenhead to Shrewsbury failed to see a warning flag for track maintenance approaching the station and derailed.

According to the Official Handbook of Stations the following classes of traffic were being handled at this station in 1956: G, P, F, L, H & C and there was a three-ton crane.

== Neighbouring stations ==
Preceding station	Historical railways	Following station
Haughton Halt	Great Western Railway; Shrewsbury to Chester Line	Whittington Low Level
