= Ellesmere railway station =

Disused railway station in Shropshire, England

Ellesmere
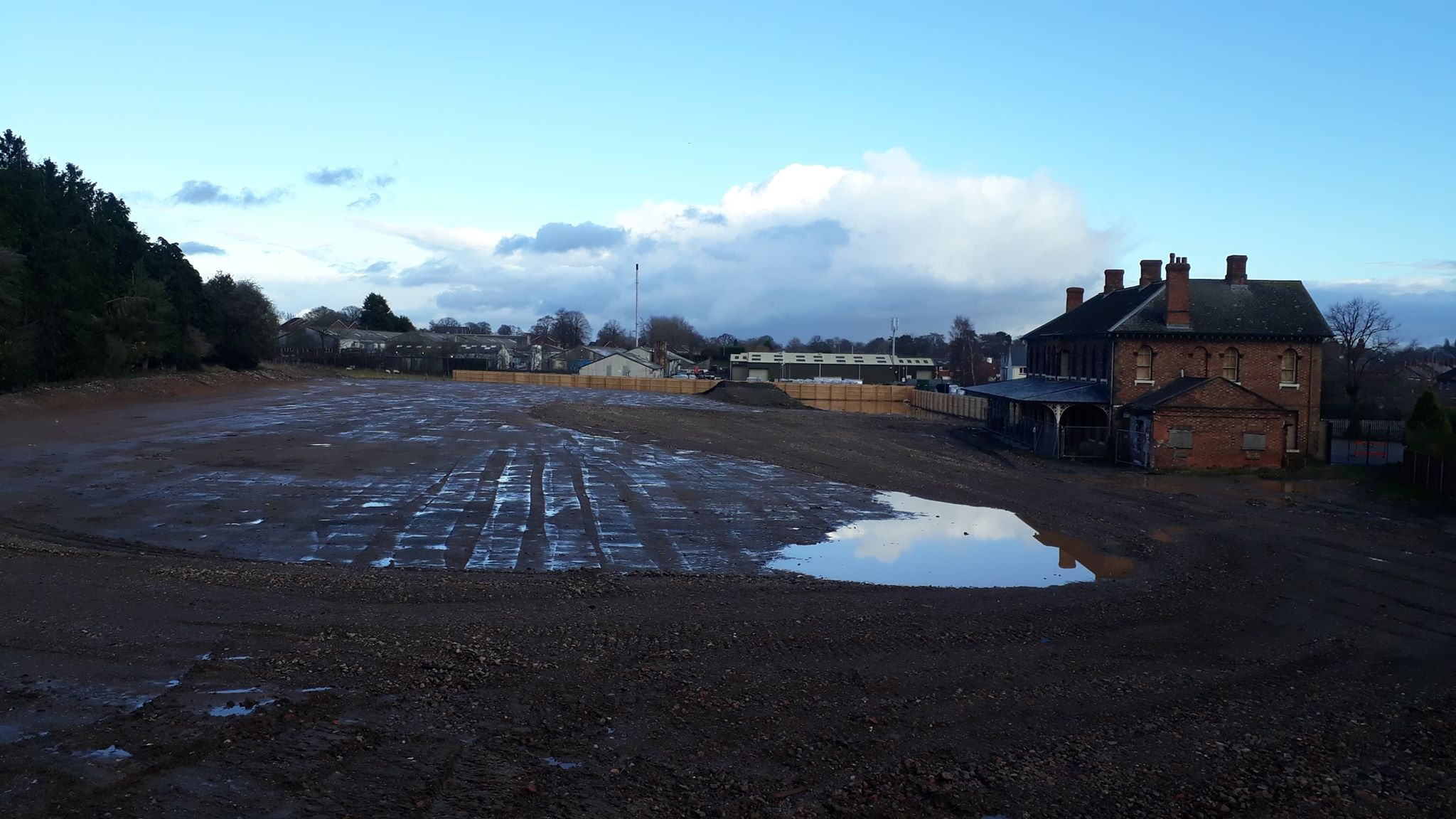
- Ellesmere station site in 2018, the former station is on the right

General information
- Location: Ellesmere, Shropshire; England
- Coordinates: 52.9094°N 2.8997°W
- Grid reference: SJ396351
- Platforms: 2

Other information
- Status: Disused

History
- Original company: Oswestry, Ellesmere and Whitchurch Railway
- Pre-grouping: Cambrian Railways
- Post-grouping: Great Western Railway

Key dates
- 4 May 1863: Opened
- 18 January 1965: Closed to passengers
- 29 March 1965: Closed
Location

Ellesmere railway station is a disused station in Ellesmere, Shropshire, England. The station was opened on 4 May 1863, closed to passengers on 18 January 1965 and closed completely on 29 March 1965.

== Station site today and possible developments ==
The site of the former station has been swept away including the trackbed to Wrexham and Oswestry by modern housing and redevelopments which are now on all the former sidings, goods yard, and trackbed. The station building survives and is a Grade II listed building, albeit derelict and disused. The former station drive serves as an access road to an industrial estate north of the station site.

In 2018, there were plans to redevelop the site from houses and station building into flats but this has caused opposition due to the problems with the main roads as well as likely causing traffic congestion.

== See also ==
- Listed buildings in Ellesmere Urban

Preceding station	Disused railways	Following station
Frankton; Line and station closed	Cambrian Railways; Oswestry, Ellesmere and Whitchurch Railway	Welshampton; Line and station closed
Elson Halt; Line and station closed	Cambrian Railways; Wrexham and Ellesmere Railway	Terminus
