= Whittington Low Level railway station =

Disused railway station in Shropshire, England

Whittington Low Level

General information
- Location: Whittington, Shropshire; England
- Coordinates: 52.8728°N 3.0098°W
- Grid reference: SJ321310
- Platforms: 2

Other information
- Status: Disused

History
- Original company: Great Western Railway
- Post-grouping: GWR; Western Region of British Railways

Key dates
- 14 October 1848: Station opened as "Whittington"
- 1 July 1924: Renamed "Whittington Low Level"
- 12 September 1960: Closed to passengers
- 7 October 1963: Closed completely
Location

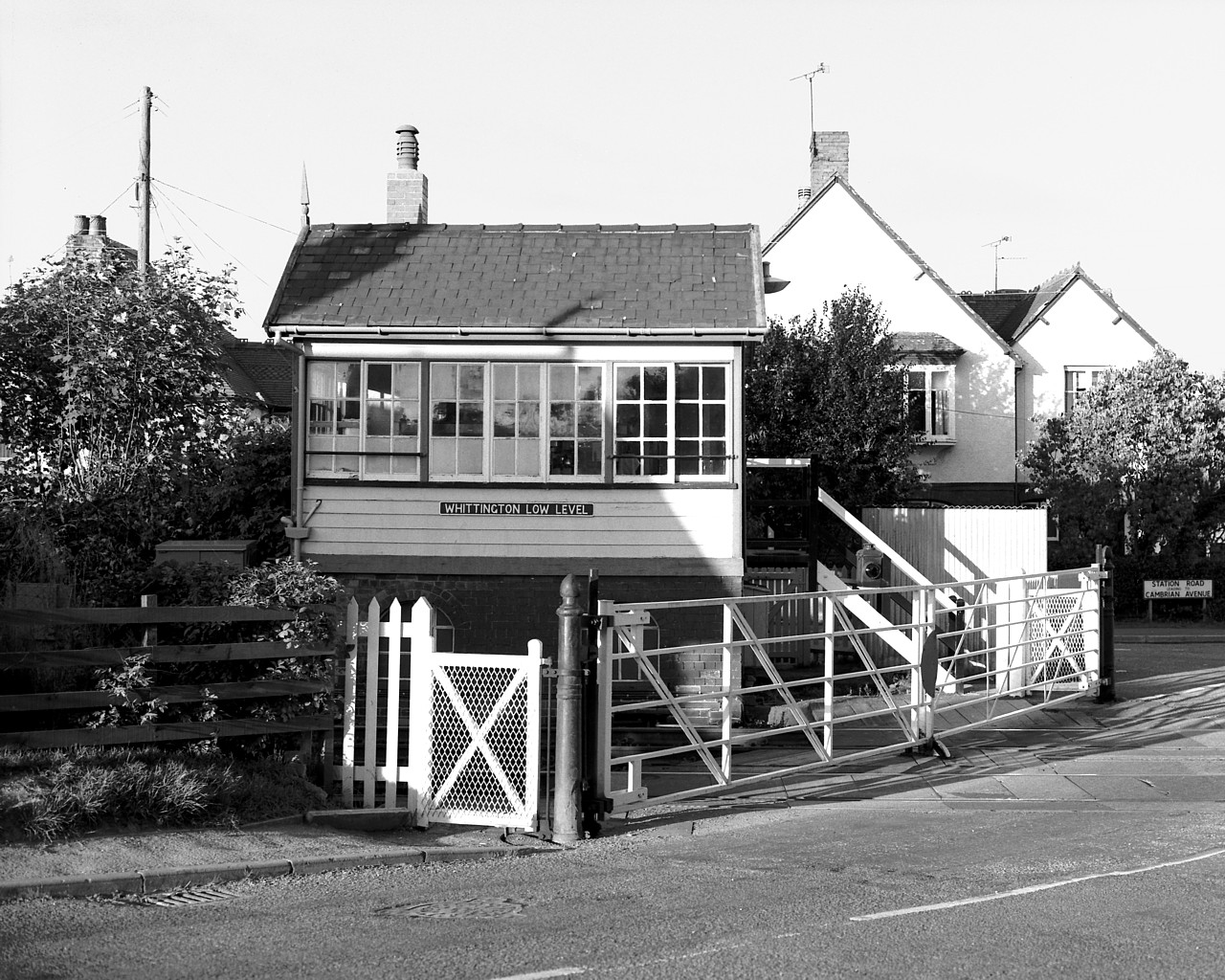
Whittington Low Level crossing before automation

Whittington Low Level railway station is a disused station and was one of two former railway stations in the village of Whittington, Shropshire, England.

== History ==
Whittington Low Level was a minor station on the GWR's Paddington to Birkenhead main line. Today this is part of the Shrewsbury to Chester Line. An automatic level crossing lies just to the north of the old station site.

In 1924 Whittington gained its "Low Level" suffix in order to distinguish it from Whittington High Level on the Oswestry to Whitchurch line of the Cambrian Railways.

== Historical services ==
Express trains did not call at Whittington Low Level, only local services, though some travelled long distances and most gave good connections to places such as Barmouth, London Paddington and Manchester Exchange.

In 1922 passenger services calling at Whittington Low Level were at their most intensive:

- On Sundays two Down (northbound) trains called:
  - both called at most stations to Chester, with good onward connections to several northern cities.
  - they were balanced by two Up (southbound) services calling at many stations to Birmingham Snow Hill, taking nearly three hours.
- On Mondays to Saturdays five Down trains called:
  - three stopping trains to Wrexham General, and
  - two stopping trains which continued beyond Wrexham to Chester.
  - there were only four Up workings, three to Shrewsbury and one going through to Birmingham Snow Hill.

Local goods traffic remained significant until the expansion in road haulage from the 1950s. According to the Official Handbook of Stations the following classes of traffic were being handled at this station in 1956: G, P, F, H & C and there was a one-ton crane.

Preceding station	Historical railways	Following station
Rednal and West Felton; Line open, station closed	Great Western Railway; Shrewsbury to Chester Line	Gobowen; Line and station open
