= Welshampton (disambiguation) =

Welshampton is a village in England.

Welshampton may also refer to:

- Welshampton and Lyneal, a civil parish in Shropshire, United Kingdom
- Welshampton rail crash, a fatal railway accident in Welshampton, England
- Welshampton railway station, shut down railway station in Welshampton, England
