= Francis Kynaston (died 1590) =

English politician

Francis Kynaston (17 November 1516–4 August 1590) was an English politician.

He was second but eldest surviving son of George Kynaston of Oteley, Shropshire, and his wife Jane, daughter of Sir Edward Grey of Enville, Staffordshire. He succeeded to his father's estates in 1542 and married by 1568, Margaret, daughter of Francis Charlton of Apley Castle, Shropshire and widow of Arthur Chambers or Chambre (d.1564) of Petton, Shropshire. By her he had two sons and six daughters, but he also fathered an illegitimate son.

Kynaston was a Member (MP) of the Parliament of England for Shropshire in April 1554 and served later as a magistrate for the county between 1579 and 1582. There is no evidence to support the common local legend he was knighted and was a cup bearer to Elizabeth I, although the Queen presented him a New Testament that was preserved at Oteley Hall as late as 1999.

He died in August 1590 aged 73 and was buried at Ellesmere, Shropshire, where a tomb chest with a pair of recumbent alabaster effigies of himself and his wife was placed in St Mary's parish church.
