= Henry Moody (RFC officer) =

British World War I flying ace

Henry Michael Moody
- Born: 1898; Welshampton, Shropshire, England
- Died: 23 April 1931 (aged 32–33); Seahurst Park, Sussex, England
- Burial place: Brookwood Cemetery; 51.295555°N 0.622532°W
- Military career
- Allegiance: United Kingdom
- Branch: British Army; Royal Air Force
- Service years: 1917–1931
- Rank: Flight Lieutenant
- Units: No. 45 Squadron RAF; No. 28 Squadron RAF
- Conflicts: World War I • Western Front • Italian Front
- Awards: Military Cross

Flight Lieutenant Henry Michael Moody MC was a British World War I flying ace credited with eight aerial victories. His sixth triumph was over German ace Alwin Thurm. He served in the Royal Air Force post-war, until killed in a flying accident in 1931.

== Family and background ==
Henry Michael Moody was born in Welshampton, Shropshire, one of twin boys born to The Reverend Henry Moody, vicar of Welshampton and Rural Dean of Ellesmere, and his wife Evelyn. His twin brother Second Lieutenant Charles Angelo Moody served in No. 1 Squadron RFC, and was killed in Belgium on 21 August 1917, aged 18, and is buried at Tyne Cot.

== Military service ==
=== First World War ===
Henry Moody was commissioned as a temporary second lieutenant (on probation) in the Royal Flying Corps, was appointed a flying officer on 21 June 1917, and confirmed in his rank on 8 August.

Moody was posted to No. 45 Squadron, operating in northern France, and flying the Sopwith Camel single seat fighter. He gained his first aerial victory on 4 September by driving down 'out of control' a Type C reconnaissance aircraft north-east of Comines. He repeated this feat on 11 September over Westroosebeke, then on 20 September shared in the shooting down in flames of a third Type C over Passchendaele with Second Lieutenants Emerson Smith and Raymond Brownell. On 13 November Moody drove down a Junkers J.I north-east of Comines, before his squadron was transferred to the Italian Front. There, on the morning of 31 December, he drove down an Albatros D.III over Pieve di Soligo, and 45 minutes later he and Brownell forced an Albatros D.V down near to Asolo, killing the pilot, German ace Alwin Thurm. On 11 January 1918 Moody destroyed an Albatros D.III over Corbelone, and on 30 January he destroyed another over Susegana for his eighth and final victory.

On 10 April 1918 Moody was appointed temporary captain, and in September 1918 his award of the Military Cross was gazetted. His citation read:

Temporary Second Lieutenant Henry Michael Moody, General List and Royal Flying Corps.

"For conspicuous gallantry and devotion to duty in leading patrols. He has destroyed four enemy aircraft and shot down three out of control. He has further carried out very successfully a number of low-flying patrols, photographic reconnaissances, and escorts, and has on all occasions shown a very fine spirit of dash and determination."

=== Post-war career ===
Moody remained in the Royal Air Force after the end of the war, and from 1 May 1919 was again appointed a temporary captain. On 1 August he was granted a permanent commission in the RAF with the rank of lieutenant.

On 2 August 1922 he married Austin Robina "Bobbie" Horn, the youngest daughter of Mr. and Mrs. C. A. Horn, of Beaumont, Jersey, and Adelaide, South Australia, at St. Aubin's Church, Jersey.

Moody was posted to No. 28 Squadron based in India on 30 August 1923, and on 1 January 1924 received promotion from flying officer to flight lieutenant. He eventually returned to England, transferred to the Home Establishment, and was posted to the Depot at RAF Uxbridge on 10 January 1927, then to the Electrical and Wireless School at RAF Flowerdown on 11 May. On 30 March 1931 Moody was transferred to headquarters of the Fighting Area at Uxbridge.

== Death ==
On 23 April 1931 Moody was acting as pilot to Air Vice-Marshal Felton Vesey Holt, the Air Officer Commanding, Fighting Area, Air Defence of Great Britain. Moody, Holt, and Holt's ADC Lieutenant E. H. Bellairs had flown to RAF Tangmere in two de Havilland DH.60 Moth biplanes belonging to No. 24 (Communication) Squadron, based at RAF Northolt, on a tour of inspection. On leaving Tangmere, Bellairs took off first, followed by Moody and Holt. After six minutes, at an altitude of about 1,500-foot (460 m) the Siskins of No. 43 (Fighter) Squadron, were preparing to land, and saw Bellairs' aircraft. Mistaking him for their commander, and not seeing Moody's aircraft, they dived in salute, and the aircraft of Sergeant Charles George Wareham and Moody clipped wings. Moody's Moth went into a spin, which he corrected, but then went into a dive which he was too low to escape from. Holt attempted to escape using his parachute, but was too low for it to deploy fully, while Moody remained in the aircraft until it crashed in thick woods near Seahurst Park, Sussex. Moody and Holt were both killed instantly. Sergeant Wareham was uninjured and was able to land safely at Tangmere. An inquest returned a verdict of accidental death, and added that no blame attached to anyone in the squadron.

Henry Michael Moody and his brother Charles Angelo Moody are both commemorated on the war memorial at the church of St Michael & All Angels in Welshampton.
