= Listed buildings in Welshampton and Lyneal =

Welshampton and Lyneal is a civil parish in Shropshire, England. It contains 40 listed buildings that are recorded in the National Heritage List for England. Of these, one is listed at Grade II*, the middle of the three grades, and the others are at Grade II, the lowest grade. The parish contains the villages of Welshampton, Lyneal and Colemere, and is otherwise rural. The Llangollen Canal passes through the parish, and five bridges crossing it are listed. Also in the parish is Oteley Park, the grounds of the demolished Oteley Hall, and a number of structures in the grounds are listed. Most of the other listed buildings are houses, cottages, farmhouses and farm buildings, the earliest of which are timber framed. Also listed are two churches, items in churchyards, a milestone, and a saw mill.

== Key ==
Grade	Criteria
II*	Particularly important buildings of more than special interest
II	Buildings of national importance and special interest

== Buildings ==
Name and location	Photograph	Date	Notes	Grade
Bank House; 52.88912°N 2.84265°W	—	Early 17th century	A farmhouse later a private house, it has been extended. The house is timber framed with red brick infill and a thatched roof. There is one storey and an attic, originally two bays, with two bays added in the late 17th century to the right. Most of the windows are casements, there is one sash window and a gabled eaves dormer.	II
Bishop's House; 52.93715°N 2.86125°W		Early 17th century	The remodelling of an earlier house, it is timber framed with red brick infill and a tile roof. There is a T-shaped plan, consisting of a main range with one storey and an attic and three bays, a rear wing with two storeys and an attic, and brick lean-tos. The doorway has a gabled hood, the windows are casements, and there is a raking eaves dormer. The gables are jettied with bressumers.	II
White House; 52.88687°N 2.84455°W	—	Early 17th century	A timber framed cottage with painted brick infill and a thatched roof. There is one storey and an attic, two bays, and an extension to the right. The windows are casements, and there is a raking dormer.	II
Old Hall Farmhouse; 52.92272°N 2.82718°W	—	Early to mid 17th century	The farmhouse, which was later altered and extended, is timber framed with red brick infill, some encasing and extensions in the red brick, and a slate roof. The original part has three bays, two two-storey extension at the rear with a lean-to dairy between. The windows are casements, and there is a cast iron pump at the far right.	II
Rose Cottage; 52.89403°N 2.82643°W		Early to mid 17th century	A farmhouse, later a private house, it is timber framed with red brick infill painted on the front, and has a thatched roof. There is one storey and an attic, and three or four bays. The windows are casements, and there is a raking eaves dormer.	II
Moss Cottage; 52.90527°N 2.82577°W	—	17th century (probable)	The cottage, which was later altered and expanded, is partly timber framed and partly in red brick, it is roughcast on the front, and has corrugated iron over a thatched roof. There is one storey and an attic, a segmental-headed doorway, casement windows, and eaves dormers.	II
Old Shop Farmhouse; 52.90953°N 2.84083°W	—	17th century (probable)	The farmhouse is in roughcast timber framing on a rendered plinth and has a slate roof. There is one storey and an attic, and two bays. The doorway has a gabled hood, the windows are casements, and there are two gabled eaves dormers.	II
The Hollies; 52.88824°N 2.84345°W	—	17th century	A timber framed cottage with painted brick infill and a thatched roof. There are two storeys, two bays, and a painted brick lean-to at the rear. The windows are casements.	II
The Island; 52.89307°N 2.82434°W	—	Mid 17th century	A timber framed cottage with rendered and painted brick infill on a painted brick plinth and with a tile roof. There is one storey and an attic and three bays. On the front is a gabled porch, the windows are casements, and there is a gabled eaves dormer.	II
Beam Cottage; 52.88738°N 2.84467°W	—	Late 17th century	The cottage was later altered and extended. It is timber framed with painted brick infill and a thatched roof. There is one storey and an attic, and an L-shaped plan, with two bays later extended to the left, and a shorter rear right wing added in the 18th century. The doorway is in an extension on the right gable end, the windows are casements, and there are three raking eaves dormers.	II
Barn south of Bishop's House; 52.93680°N 2.86122°W	—	Late 17th century	The barn is timber framed with weatherboarding and has a corrugated iron roof. There are two levels and an L-shaped plan, with a long west range and a shorter south range to the east. The west range contains four doorways and two eaves hatches, and in the south range are an entrance, a stable door and an eaves hatch.	II
Hazel Cottage; 52.90937°N 2.84160°W	—	Late 17th century	A timber framed cottage with painted brick infill and rebuilding in brick, on a rendered plinth, with a tile roof. There is one storey and an attic, three bays, and a brick lean-to on the left. The doorway has a gabled hood, the windows are casements, and there is a gabled eaves dormer.	II
Little Mill; 52.89527°N 2.85226°W		Late 17th century	A timber framed cottage with red brick infill on a plinth, with painted brick gable ends and a thatched roof. There is one storey and an attic, and two bays. The windows are casements, and there are raking dormers.	II
Old Hall; 52.89247°N 2.82484°W	—	Late 17th century (probable)	A farmhouse, later a private house, probably incorporating earlier material, and subsequently altered and extended. It is in red brick with a timber framed gable and a slate roof. There are two storeys and an irregular plan. The porch has two storeys and a crow-stepped gable, and the windows are casements. Inside the house are inglenook fireplaces.	II
Cowhouse, Old Hall Farm; 52.92272°N 2.82718°W	—	Early to mid 18th century (probable)	The cowhouse is timber framed with red brick infill on a high brick plinth, with a roof of slate and corrugated iron. It contains two tiers of windows, doors, air vents, and eaves hatches.	II
Holbrook and Menlove memorials 52.90904°N 2.84290°W	—	c.1789	The memorials are in the churchyard of St Michael's Church, and are to the memory of members of the Holbrook and Menlove families. They are both chest tombs in sandstone.	II
Bridge No. 52 (Greaves Bridge); 52.89910°N 2.83432°W		1797–1801	An accommodation bridge over the Llangollen Canal, it is in red brick, and consists of a single elliptical arch. The bridge has a stone-coped parapet ending in square corner piers, projecting keyblocks, and a string course.	II
Bridge No. 54 (Misseach Bridge); 52.89625°N 2.84205°W		1797–1801	An accommodation bridge over the Llangollen Canal, it is in red brick, and consists of a single elliptical arch. The bridge has a stone-coped parapet ending in square corner piers, projecting keyblocks, and a string course. On the right side is a round-headed alcove with an iron door.	II
Bridge No. 55 (Little Mill Bridge); 52.89582°N 2.85205°W		1797–1801	The bridge carries a road over the Llangollen Canal, it is in red brick, and consists of a single elliptical arch. The bridge has a stone-coped parapet ending in square corner piers, projecting keyblocks, and a string course.	II
Bridge No. 56 (Burns Wood Bridge); 52.89782°N 2.86264°W		1797–1801	An accommodation bridge over the Shropshire Union Canal, it is in red brick, and consists of a single elliptical arch. The bridge has a stone-coped parapet ending in square corner piers, projecting keyblocks, and a string course.	II
Bridge No. 57 (Ellesmere Tunnel); 52.90040°N 2.87536°W		1797–1801	The bridge carries roads over the Llangollen Canal, and forms a tunnel about 90 metres (300 ft) long. It is in red brick, and consists of a single elliptical arch. The bridge has a stone-coped parapet ending in square corner piers with shallow pyramidal caps, rusticated stone voussoirs, and a flat string course. The towpath has a cast iron handrail.	II
Park Farmhouse; 52.90431°N 2.86372°W	—	c. 1800	A red brick farmhouse with a dentilled eaves cornice and a slate roof. There are two storeys and an attic, and a T-shaped plan, consisting of main range with three bays, a rear gabled range, a two-storey lean-to in the left angle, and a single-storey lean-to in the right angle. The central doorway has a rectangular fanlight and a pediment, and the windows are casements with segmental heads.	II
Sundial; 52.90894°N 2.84361°W	—	c. 1819–20	The sundial is in the churchyard of St Michael's Church. It is in sandstone, and consists of a vase-shaped baluster with a moulded plinth and capping on a moulded circular base. On the top is an inscribed brass plate and a gnomon.	II
Lee Memorial; 52.90891°N 2.84310°W	—	c. 1820	The memorial is in the churchyard of St Michael's Church, and is to the memory of members of the Lee family. The memorial is a chest tomb in sandstone. It has a moulded plinth and a plain cap surmounted by a pedimented top ledger with an urn finial. There are corner pilasters with fluted decoration and moulded inscription panels.	II
Hampton House Farmhouse; 52.91296°N 2.84480°W	—	Early 19th century	A red brick farmhouse with a dentilled eaves cornice and a half-hipped slate roof. There are two storeys and a front of three bays with a pediment containing a small lunette. The central doorway has pilasters, panelled reveals, and a rectangular fanlight. In the ground floor are French windows, and the upper floor contains sash windows. In front of the house and continuing on the left return is a cast iron verandah with a glass canopy.	II
Game larder, Oteley Hall; 52.90792°N 2.87489°W	—	1826–42	The game larder for the hall, now demolished, is in red brick and has a pyramidal roof with an onion-shaped finial. There is a single storey and a square plan, and it contains two tiers of iron-barred windows and a central square-headed doorway.	II
Garden feature 52.90460°N 2.87320°W	—	1826–42	The garden feature is in yellow sandstone. The upper section consists of a rectangular bastion with a corbelled parapet, and the lower part is a buttressed revetment wall with a coped parapet. In front of the bastion is an infilled Tudor arch.	II
Outbuilding east of Swiss Cottage; 52.90863°N 2.87711°W	—	1826–42	The outbuilding is in red brick and rusticated sandstone, and has slate roofs. There is one storey, a T-shaped plan, and a tower behind the right range. The left range has segmental-headed cast iron windows, and in the right range are casement windows. The tower has a doorway, above which is an oriel window, a corbelled eaves cornice, and a pyramidal roof with gabled lucarnes and a pointed finial.	II
Swiss Cottage; 52.90865°N 2.87751°W		1826–42	The cottage in Oteley Park is in wood on a rusticated sandstone plinth, and has a slate roof with finials and pendants. There is one storey and an L-shaped plan, with a projecting porch to the north. On the south side is a gable and a Tudor arched entrance. The porch has openwork panels, the windows have four lights and are on carved wooden brackets, and the gables and eaves have decorative bargeboards.	II
Terraces, bastions, steps and boat house 52.90680°N 2.87706°W	—	1826–42	The structures are in Oteley Park, and are in yellow sandstone. There are upper and lower terraces, the upper terraces ending in bastions. Flights of steps lead between them and down to the boathouse, which has two segmental chamfered arches. Other features include a panelled urn, a kiln-like structure, a stone bench and a tourelle.	II
Tower; 52.90799°N 2.87767°W		1826–42	The tower in Oteley Park is in yellow sandstone with dressings in red sandstone and a tiled spire, and is in Venetian style. The bottom stage has a rectangular plan, and contains a doorway with a pointed head. At the top is a corbelled balcony with a balustrade, above which is an octagonal stage with gables, and a broach spire with a decorative wrought iron weathervane.	II
Urn southeast of tower 52.90775°N 2.87673°W	—	1826–42	A large sandstone urn in Oteley Park. It is decorated with foliage and two large rams' heads, and stands on a carved plinth.	II
Urn south of tower 52.90783°N 2.87771°W	—	1826–42	A large sandstone urn in Oteley Park. It is decorated with foliage and two large rams' heads, and stands on a carved plinth.	II
Ellesmere Lodge, walls and gate piers 52.90234°N 2.87873°W	—	1836	The lodge is in sandstone on a plinth and has a slate roof with moulded coped verges. It is in Gothic style, and has a single storey and a T-shaped plan. On the front is an oriel window, and on the right side is a gabled porch, and an octagonal oriel window with an embattled parapet and a finial. To the left is an embattled sandstone wall containing a segmental-headed doorway. To the left of the lodge is a pair of gate piers, the left is octagonal with an embattled parapet and a finial, and the right is square with moulded capping and a finial.	II
Milestone; 52.90005°N 2.80820°W	—	Mid 19th century (probable)	The milestone is on the north side of the B5063 road. It is in limestone, and has a rectangular section and a rounded top. On the front is a cast iron plate inscribed with the distances in miles to Wem and to Ellesmere.	II
St Michael's Church; 52.90870°N 2.84340°W		1863	The church was designed by George Gilbert Scott in Early English style, and is in yellow sandstone with a roof of grey slate with green diapering. It consists of a nave, a lean-to south aisle, a gabled north porch, and a chancel with a lean-to south vestry and an apsidal sanctuary. On the junction of the nave and chancel is a gabled bellcote.	II
Lych gate 52.90910°N 2.84386°W	—	1863 (probable)	The lych gate, designed by George Gilbert Scott, is at the entrance to the churchyard of St Michael's Church. It has a timber structure on yellow sandstone side walls with chamfered coping, and a tile roof.	II
St John's Church; 52.89066°N 2.83704°W		1870	The church, designed by G. E. Street in Decorated style, is in yellow sandstone with bands of red sandstone and tile roofs. It consists of a nave and chancel in one cell, a north vestry and a south organ chamber. At the junction of the nave and the chancel is a gabled bellcote. At the west end are three long lancet windows, and the other windows contain Geometrical tracery.	II*
The Old Vicarage and outbuildings 52.88958°N 2.83783°W	—	c. 1870	The vicarage, later a private house, was designed by G. E. Street. It is in sandstone, and has two storeys, a moulded band, and stepped diagonal corner buttresses. The windows are mullioned, and above the entrance is a recess with a pointed head containing a carved cross. Attached at right angles on the rear to the left are L-shaped single-storey outbuildings.	II
Saw mill 52.90347°N 2.85893°W	—	Late 19th century	The sawmill is in red brick and has a roof of slate and corrugated iron. It has a single storey, and consists of a main block with an outshut at the rear and a lower range to the right. There is a square tapering chimney with a stepped base and corbelled capping.	II
