= Old Town Hall, Ellesmere =

Municipal building in Ellesmere, Shropshire, England

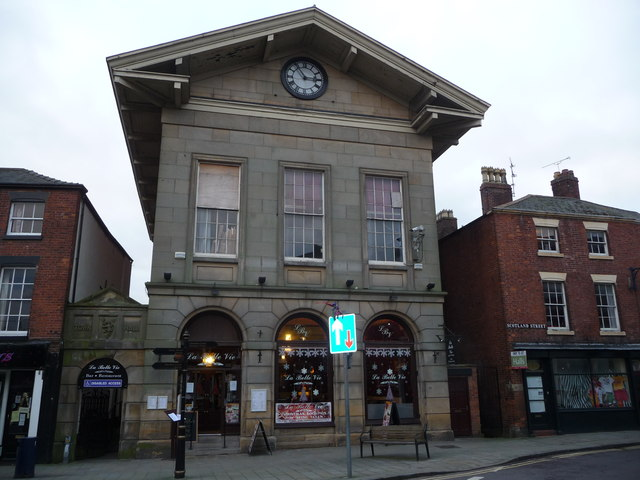
- Old Town Hall, Ellesmere

- Shown in Shropshire
- 52.9071°N 2.8937°W
- Location: High Street, Ellesmere

History
- Built: 1833

Site notes
- Architect: Edward Haycock
- Architectural style: Neoclassical style

Listed Building – Grade II
- Official name: Town Hall
- Designated: 19 March 1951
- Reference no.: 1055513

The Old Town Hall is a municipal building in the High Street in Ellesmere, Shropshire, England. The structure, which was the meeting place of Ellesmere Urban District Council, is a Grade II listed building.

== History ==
The building was a gift to the town from the Countess of Bridgewater, who supported local projects across the Bridgewater Estates and lived at Ashridge House in Hertfordshire. It was designed by Edward Haycock in the neoclassical style, was built in ashlar stone and was completed in 1833. The building was arcaded on the ground floor, so that markets could be held, with an assembly room on the first floor. The design involved a symmetrical main frontage with three bays facing onto the High Street; there were three round headed rooms on the ground floor, three sash windows on the first floor, and at roof level, there was a pediment with a wide overhang and a clock in the tympanum.

The assembly room was refurbished at the expense of Earl Brownlow in 1878 and, after the markets moved to the new market hall in Scotland Street in 1879, the arcading was infilled with glass and a free reading room was established on the ground floor of the building in 1884. An Iron Age canoe dating back to around 500 BC, which had been found in Whattal Moss, a forest just south of Colemere, in 1864, was placed on display in a small local history museum, which formed part of the reading room, in the late 19th century. After significant population growth, largely associated with Ellesmere's status as a market town, the area became an urban district with the town hall as its headquarters in 1894. Cinema viewings also took place in the reading room from 1931.

The town hall continued to serve as the headquarters of Ellesmere Urban District Council for much of the 20th century but ceased to be local seat of government after the enlarged North Shropshire Rural District Council was formed in 1967. The old town hall ceased to have any further municipal use at all after a new community hall in Willow Street was officially opened by the Lord Lieutenant of Shropshire, Major General Viscount Bridgeman on 25 March 1968. The new community hall subsequently became the meeting place of Ellesmere Town Council and, in due course, became the new Ellesmere Town Hall. The old town hall was subsequently marketed for sale and was put to a variety of uses, briefly operating as a restaurant, before being converted into the offices of an estate agent. A public house was established in the basement of the building in June 2017.

== See also ==
- Listed buildings in Ellesmere Urban
