= St Mary's Church, Ellesmere =

Coordinates: 52.9075°N 2.8895°W

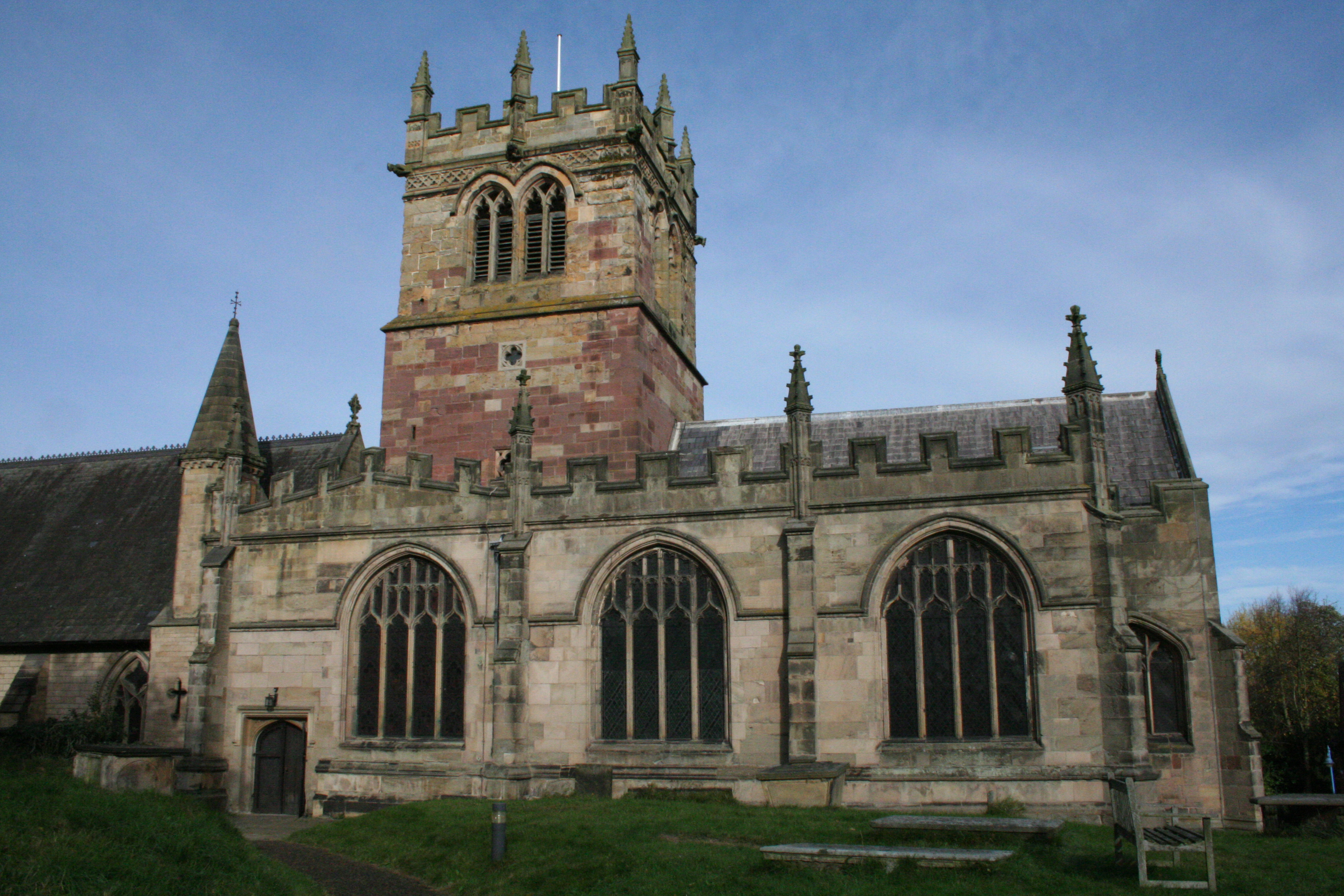
- Chancel and tower of St Mary's Church, Ellesmere, from the south

- Location in Shropshire
- OS grid reference: SJ 403 348
- Location: Ellesmere, Shropshire
- Country: England
- Denomination: Anglican
- Website: www.achurchnearyou.com/church/4273//

History
- Status: Parish church

Architecture
- Functional status: Active
- Heritage designation: Grade I
- Designated: 19 March 1951
- Architect(s): George Gilbert Scott; Arthur Blomfield; J. Loughborough Pearson (restorations)
- Architectural type: Church
- Style: Norman, Gothic, Gothic Revival

Specifications
- Materials: Sandstone, slate roofs

Administration
- Province: Canterbury
- Diocese: Lichfield
- Archdeaconry: Salop
- Deanery: Ellesmere
- Parish: Ellesmere

Clergy
- Vicar: Revd Pat Hawkins

St Mary's Church stands on a hill in the town of Ellesmere, Shropshire, England. It is an active Anglican parish church in the deanery of Ellesmere, the archdeaconry of Salop, and the diocese of Lichfield. The church is recorded in the National Heritage List for England as a designated Grade I listed building.

== History ==
The church originated in the Norman era, and still contains some elements of Norman architecture. The south chancel chapel dates from the early 14th century, and the tower from between 1439 and 1449. In 1848–49 the church was altered and restored by George Gilbert Scott. His work included replacing the nave, restoring the transepts, and adding a stair turret to the south transept. In 1883 Arthur Blomfield restored the south chancel chapel, and in 1887 J. Loughborough Pearson rebuilt the east wall of the chancel and reconstructed the east window. Pinnacles were added to the tower, or were restored, in 1904.

== Architecture ==
=== Exterior ===
St Mary's is constructed in sandstone with slate roofs. It has a cruciform plan, with a five bay nave, north and south aisles, north and south transepts, a chancel with north and south chapels, and a tower at the crossing. The tower is in two stages, with pairs of two-light Perpendicular bell openings. Above these are a quatrefoil frieze, gargoyles, a battlemented parapet, and eight pinnacles. The transepts were originally in Early English style, and the north doorway of the north transept is still in that style. The north chancel chapel is in Perpendicular style.

=== Interior ===
The nave arcades are carried on clustered piers and have moulded arches. The crossing is in Early English style. The roof of the south chancel chapel is considered to be one of the finest in the county. It is carried on stone corbels, which are carved alternately with heads and foliage. It has a low pitch, and contains moulded and carved beams, moulded rafters, bosses, and quatrefoil panels. The bosses are carved with the heraldry of the Stanley family. The west arch of the chapel has a pierced timber tympanum. Between the north chancel chapel and the chancel is an arcade carried on octagonal piers. In the chancel is a Perpendicular triple sedilia. The font dates from the 19th century and contains panels carved with depictions of Christ's Passion; it has replaced an earlier font of 1569. Other items of furniture, including the pulpit and lectern, were designed by Scott.

There is stained glass in all the windows. That in the east window, dating from 1889 is by Heaton, Butler and Bayne, and depicts the Ascension. The east window in the south chapel, dating from 1883, is by Burlison and Grylls, and depicts Christ and saints. In the south transept and the aisles are windows from 1849 to 1850 by William Wailes, the north window in the north transept of about 1853 is by O'Connor, and the west window of the nave, dated 1849, is by William Warrington. The oldest monument in the church dates from the early 14th century and consists of the recumbent figure of a civilian man, now mounted vertically on the west wall of the north chapel; the figure is believed to be of a scrivener or notary, who has a book in his hands and an inkhorn and pencase hanging on his belt. There is also a tombchest containing the alabaster effigies of Francis Kynaston (died 1590), and his wife. The three-manual pipe organ was built by Nicholson and Company in 1928, and later moved to the east side of the north transept. The organ was rebuilt with additions in 1997 by Cartwright and Cartwright. There is a ring of eight bells, all cast by Rudhall of Gloucester; three of these are dated 1727, four are dated 1768, and the eighth bell is dated 1799.

== External features ==
In the churchyard is a sundial dated 1726. It consists of a stone vase-shaped baluster standing on a two-tier base, which carries a stone basin with a bronze dial. The sundial is listed at Grade II. Also in the churchyard is the parish war memorial (unveiled 1920), an 18-foot high cross of Runcorn stone surmounted by a lantern-head depicting the Crucifixion, St John, St Mary, and St George and the dragon, said to be an adaptation of the 15th-century cross at Dorchester-on-Thames. Metal plates around its base list 68 men from World War I and 10 from World War II.

== See also ==
- Grade I listed churches in Shropshire
- Listed buildings in Ellesmere Urban
