= Welshampton and Lyneal =

Civil parish in Shropshire, England

Coordinates: 52.901°N 2.829°W

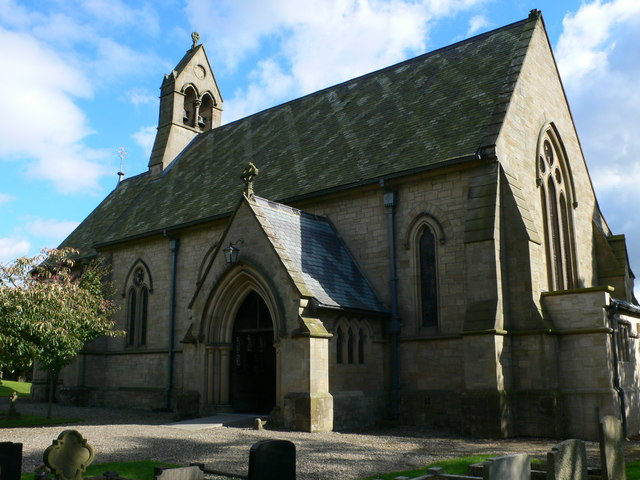
- Church of St Michael and All Angels, Welshampton

- Location within Shropshire
- Population: 852 (2011 census)
- Civil parish: Welshampton and Lyneal
- Unitary authority: Shropshire
- Ceremonial county: Shropshire
- Region: West Midlands
- Country: England
- Sovereign state: United Kingdom
- Police: West Mercia
- Fire: Shropshire
- Ambulance: West Midlands

Welshampton and Lyneal is a civil parish in Shropshire, England. The population of the civil parish at the 2011 census was 852.

The current parish is the result of a controversial merger of an older parish, Welshampton, with part of Ellesmere Rural parish.

The parish includes Welshampton and Lyneal, and the surrounding villages of Balmer Heath, Breaden Heath, Colemere, and Newton.

== See also ==
- Listed buildings in Welshampton and Lyneal
- Lyneal cum Colemere
