= Breaden Heath =

Village in Shropshire, England

Coordinates: 52.923°N 2.826°W

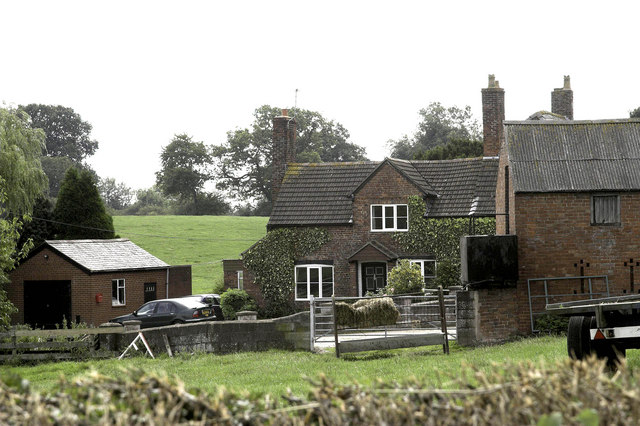
- Lower Farm, Breaden Heath

- Location within Shropshire
- OS grid reference: SJ444365
- Civil parish: Welshampton and Lyneal
- Unitary authority: Shropshire
- Ceremonial county: Shropshire
- Region: West Midlands
- Country: England
- Sovereign state: United Kingdom
- Post town: WHITCHURCH
- Postcode district: SY13
- Dialling code: 01948
- Police: West Mercia
- Fire: Shropshire
- Ambulance: West Midlands
- UK Parliament: North Shropshire

Breaden Heath is a small village in Shropshire, England. It lies right on the border with Wales.
