= Oliver Ingham =

English army commander (1287–1344)

Sir Oliver Ingham (c. 1287–1344) was an English knight and landowner who served as a soldier and administrator under King Edward II of England and his successor, King Edward III. He was responsible for the civil government and military defence of the Duchy of Aquitaine during the War of Saint-Sardos and the early part of the Hundred Years' War.

== Early life ==
Born about 1287, he was the son and heir of Sir John Ingham (1260–1309) of Ingham, Norfolk, who had served in the wars of King Edward I against the Scots, and his wife Margery. In 1310 he not only inherited his father's lands in Norfolk, Suffolk, Wiltshire and Hampshire but was himself summoned by King Edward II for military service against Scotland. Appointed a household knight of the king, he received many royal grants including the custody of Ellesmere Castle in Shropshire, keeper for the counties of Cheshire and Flintshire, and official positions in Shropshire and Wiltshire. As a knight banneret, he served in Scotland with the king in August 1322.

== First term in Aquitaine ==
In 1324 he was appointed adviser to the king's half-brother Edmund of Woodstock, 1st Earl of Kent, who represented Edward as his lieutenant in Aquitaine. Tensions had led to the outbreak of war with France, which captured much of the ill-defended Agenais. Ingham, dispatched to Aquitaine with a force of Spanish and other mercenary troops, regained some of the losses in the Agenais and Saintonge. After arranging a truce, the Earl of Kent departed for England in 1325. In 1326, Ingham was appointed Seneschal of Gascony, the highest post in what remained in English possession, holding extensive powers over the law and finance of the duchy. Though he appears to have earned the confidence of many members of the Gascon nobility, an agreement with the French in 1327 led to his removal from Aquitaine.

== Crises in England ==
Partly as a result of English losses in the war, the political climate at home had changed dramatically. Edward II had been deposed and replaced by his young son Edward III, under the regency of his mother Queen Isabella and her lover Roger Mortimer. As the regents wanted peace, in the final treaty with France the loss of the Agenais was accepted and Ingham's conquests there were abandoned. Although he had been an associate of the Despensers, he largely escaped the retaliations that followed their fall. Becoming an adherent of Mortimer, he was summoned to parliament between June 1328 and September 1330 and was one of the not impartial judges in the trial of the conspirators who attempted to overthrow Mortimer in February 1329. In October 1330, when Mortimer was removed from power, Ingham was captured by the forces of Edward III at Nottingham and sent for trial to London. On 22 October, his lands and goods were declared forfeit. However he was pardoned on 8 December 1330, the new king acknowledging his loyal service in the past, and his property was restored to him with the important exception of grants from the crown.

== Second term in Aquitaine ==
From this time on, he served the king in Aquitaine and rarely returned to England. On 29 June 1331 he was reappointed as seneschal in Aquitaine, responsible for the peace, order, and defence of the duchy at a time of deteriorating Anglo-French relations, which culminated in the outbreak of the Hundred Years' War in 1337. The defences of the duchy had been undermined by the loss of several key castles in the previous war and the loyalty of the local nobility was divided, as many owned estates on both sides of the border. By August 1336 the duchy was on a war footing again, Ingham being ordered to forbid all Gascon men-at-arms to leave the land without licence and to ensure all major strongholds were properly garrisoned, equipped, and victualled.

On 24 May 1337, King Philip VI of France announced that he was confiscating Aquitaine and French commissioners were sent to take possession of the duchy. Ingham met them at Libourne and refused to surrender his territory. He then began military operations, mostly in the Agenais. Overall English strategy concentrated on attacking the north of France, with the result that Ingham in the south-west received neither troops nor funds from England and had to rely entirely on local resources. The income of the duchy depended mainly on tolls and custom dues from goods conveyed along the great rivers, but trade dried up almost entirely with the onset of war. Most of what revenue remained had to be used to support garrison commanders. As a result, Ingham's government in the capital city of Bordeaux had very limited options over how to conduct the defence. Although losing Penne-d'Agenais, he successfully defended Bonnegarde and other strongholds and fought off a French attack on Bordeaux itself in 1339. Despite financial stringency, he retained substantial companies of Gascon nobles in his service. His services to the crown in Aquitaine were acknowledged when his and his ancestors' debts were written off.

== Death and burial ==
Leaving Aquitaine in 1343, he returned to England and died, probably at Ingham, on 29 January 1344. The inquisition post mortem recorded that in Ingham he held the manor and the advowson of the church, where he was buried in a tomb that has survived. His widow died on 11 October 1350 and was buried beside him, the inscription, in medieval French, having been recorded as: Monsieur Oliver de Ingham gist icy et Dame Elizabeth sa compagne que luy Dieux de les almes eit mercy (Sir Oliver Ingham lies here and Dame Elizabeth his wife; may God have mercy on their souls).

== Family ==
With his wife Elizabeth Zouche, daughter of William la Zouche, 1st Baron Zouche, and his wife Maud Lovell, he had four children: Oliver (died 1326), John (died 1339), Elizabeth (dead by 1344), and Joan. As three of the children died before him, his inheritance was split between his granddaughter Mary, aged eight, only child of Elizabeth and her husband John Curzon, and Joan, aged 24. Joan had married first Sir Roger Le Strange of Knockin (15 Aug 1301 – 29 Jul 1349), son of Sir John Le Strange and his wife Isolde Walton, and then, reportedly on 30 Nov 1350, Sir Miles Stapleton of Bedale (about 1318 – 4 Dec 1364 ), son of Sir Gilbert Stapleton and his wife Agnes (or Maud) Fitz Alan. In June 1360 she and Miles founded a chantry at Ingham to commemorate the souls of, among others, her father and mother. She was dead by 1365, leaving as heir her son, Sir Miles Stapleton (1357–1419).

== Coat of arms ==
The coat of arms of Oliver Ingham is blazoned: Per pale Or and Vert, a cross recercele (or moline) Gules. and the crest as: On a chapeau Gules turned up Ermine, an owl Proper sitting in holly-leaves Vert.
