= Listed buildings in Ellesmere Urban =

Ellesmere Urban is a civil parish in Shropshire, England. It contains 106 listed buildings that are recorded in the National Heritage List for England. Of these, one is listed at Grade I, the highest of the three grades, two are at Grade II*, the middle grade, and the others are at Grade II, the lowest grade. Ellesmere is a market town, and most of the listed buildings are houses, cottages, and shops in the town. Some of them date from the 17th century and are timber framed, but the largest number date from the early 19th century, some of which incorporate earlier material. The oldest listed building is the parish church, and a sundial in the churchyard is also listed. The other listed buildings include public houses and a hotel, a canal warehouse, a bank, a mounting block, a town hall, a former fire station, and a former railway station.

== Key ==
Grade	Criteria
I	Buildings of exceptional interest, sometimes considered to be internationally important
II*	Particularly important buildings of more than special interest
II	Buildings of national importance and special interest

== Buildings ==
Name and location	Photograph	Date	Notes	Grade
St Mary's Church; 52.90756°N 2.88943°W		c. 1100	The church has retained some Norman features, but most have been removed in successive restorations. The first was by George Gilbert Scott in 1848–49, who replaced the nave with one in Perpendicular style, and restored the transepts. In 1883 Arthur Blomfield restored a chancel chapel, and in 1889 John Loughborough Pearson rebuilt the east wall of the chancel. The church is built in sandstone with slate roofs, and has a cruciform plan, consisting of a nave, north and south aisles, north and south transepts, a chancel with north and south chapels, and a tower at the crossing. The tower has two stages, and at the top are a quatrefoil frieze, gargoyles, an embattled parapet, and eight pinnacles.	I
White Hart Public House; 52.90698°N 2.89252°W		Late 16th century	The public house is timber framed with plaster infill, the lower floor stuccoed, on a brick plinth, with a slate roof. There are two storeys and three bays. The upper floor is jettied, with a moulded bressumer on enriched consoles. The doorway has a plain surround, and the windows are casements.	II
1 Church Hill; 52.90694°N 2.88913°W	—	c. 1600	The cottage is partly timber framed with brick infill and partly in brick, with a tile roof. It has two storeys and two bays. The windows are cast iron lattice casements, and to the right is a wooden gabled porch.	II
2 and 4 St John's Hill; 52.90718°N 2.89245°W	—	c. 1600	A house partly timber framed with brick infill and partly in brick, with a slate roof. There are two storeys and an attic, and one bay. It contains a small shop front, a casement window, and a gabled dormer.	II
4 Market Street; 52.90739°N 2.89420°W	—	Late 16th or early 17th century	At one time the White Lion Public House, it is partly timber framed, and partly in brick with a slate roof. There are two storeys and an attic, and two bays, the left bay gabled. The doorway has a moulded and carved surround and a canopy, and the windows are casements. Inside is timber framing, some with wattle and daub infill.	II
7–9 Birch Road; 52.90675°N 2.89231°W	—	Early 17th century	A row of timber framed cottages with brick infill and a slate roof. There is one storey and attics, and four bays. The windows are casements, those in the attics in raking dormers.	II
7 St John's Hill; 52.90723°N 2.89220°W	—	Early 17th century	A timber framed house encased in brick and rendered, it has two storeys and an attic, and two bays. The doorway has a gabled hood, and the windows are casements. Inside is some exposed timber framing.	II
31 Scotland Street; 52.90641°N 2.89657°W	—	Early 17th century	The house is timber framed with brick infill and a gabled front with plain bargeboards. It has two storeys, the upper floor jettied with a moulded bressumer. The doorway has a segmental head, and the windows are casements.	II
Yolande Court; 52.90849°N 2.89101°W	—	Early 17th century	A timber framed house with brick infill and a tiled roof, which has been divided into three dwellings. There are two storeys, and an L-shaped plan, consisting of a five-bay hall range, and a slightly projecting gabled cross-wing on the left, the upper floor of the gable being jettied. The windows are casements, and in front of the house is a cobbled courtyard.	II
Store at rear of 1–5 High Street; 52.90739°N 2.89327°W	—	17th century	A small timber framed building with brick infill and a slate roof. It has one storey with a gable, and a small window in the gable.	II
8 St John's Hill; 52.90712°N 2.89228°W	—	17th century	A timber framed house refronted in brick in the 19th century, it has corbelled eaves and a slate roof. There are three storeys and a symmetrical front of two bays. The central doorway has a pedimented hood, and the windows are sashes.	II
9 Talbot Street and barn 52.90911°N 2.89179°W	—	17th century	The house is timber framed with brick infill and two storeys, there is a 19th-century brick wing to the southeast, and at the rear is a barn, partly timber-framed and partly in brick. The roofs are slateed, and the windows are casements. In the brick wing is a doorway with pilasters and a pedimented hood.	II
11 and 13 Talbot Street; 52.90872°N 2.89179°W	—	17th century	A pair of cottages, roughcast over timber framing, with one storey and attics. There are two simple doorways, two casement windows, and two gabled dormers. At the rear is exposed timber framing.	II
23 Talbot Street; 52.90857°N 2.89132°W	—	17th century	The house was altered later, the front is timber framed with brick infill, the gable end facing the street is roughcast, and the roof is partly tiled and partly slated. There are two storeys and an attic, three bays, and a single-storey brick extension at the front. The windows are sashes.	II
1–5 Watergate Street; 52.90748°N 2.89263°W	—	17th century	A row of three cottages, later combined into one dwelling, basically timber framed and largely encased in brick, with dentil eaves and a slate roof. There are two storeys, the windows are a mix of casements, and sashes, some horizontally-sliding, and the doorway has a segmental head.	II
Cremorne Cottage; 52.90960°N 2.89065°W	—	17th century	The cottage was extended in the 19th century. The earlier part is timber framed with later brick infilling, and the extension is in brick. The cottage has two storeys and a slate roof, and the extension to the north has a single storey. The windows are casements.	II
Glebe Cottage; 52.90651°N 2.89015°W	—	17th century	Basically timber framed, the house is largely encased in brick and roughcast, with a slate roof, one storey and an attic. Steps with railings lead up to a plain doorway, there are three casement windows, and a gabled dormer.	II
The White House; 52.90948°N 2.89272°W	—	17th century	A timber framed cottage with brick infill and a slate roof. It has one storey, two bays, and a lean-to rear extension containing a trellis gabled porch. The windows are casements.	II
Sundial; 52.90731°N 2.88906°W	—	1726	The sundial is in the churchyard of St Mary's Church. It is in stone and consists of a vase-shaped baluster on a two-stepped stone base, and has a stone basin containing a brass dial inscribed with names and the date, and a gnomon.	II
The Grange; 52.91404°N 2.89857°W	—	18th century	A large house that was extended in the 19th century. It is in red brick with stone dressings, three storeys, and most of the windows are sashes. On the west side is a verandah, in the extension to the east is a polygonal bay window and another verandah with a balcony, a Venetian window, and a polygonal conservatory.	II
1 and 3 Birch Road; 52.90715°N 2.89260°W	—	Late 18th century	A brick building with dentil eaves and a slate roof. There are two storeys and an attic, and three bays. One doorway is blocked, the other has a plain surround, the windows are casements with segmental heads, and there are three gabled dormers.	II
17 Cross Street and Swan Hotel; 52.90769°N 2.89361°W		Late 18th century	A shop and a public house in brick, the public house stuccoed, with two storeys and attics, and corbelled eaves. No. 17 has two bays, a shop front in the ground floor, and casement windows and two box dormers above. The public house has three bays, quoins, and a sill band. The central doorway has a moulded surround, pilasters, and a small cornice, the windows are sashes, and there are two box dormers.	II
14 High Street; 52.90722°N 2.89300°W	—	Late 18th century	A shop in painted brick with a slate roof, three storeys and three bays. In the ground floor is a modified 19th-century shop front with arched heads to the window lights. The upper floors contain sash windows, those in the middle floor with cambered heads. Also in the middle floor is an elaborate wrought iron sign bracket.	II
16 and 18 High Street; 52.90723°N 2.89285°W	—	Late 18th century	A pair of brick shops with a tile roof. There are two storeys and attics, and two bays. In the ground floor are shop fronts, and above are sash windows and two gabled dormers.	II
24 Watergate Street; 52.90791°N 2.89182°W	—	Late 18th century	A stuccoed house, the ground floor rusticated, with a storey band, quoins, and a slate roof. There are three storeys and three bays. The central doorway has a moulded surround with pilasters, a rectangular fanlight, and an open pediment. The windows are sashes with plain keyblocks and lintels.	II
8 Willow Street; 52.90767°N 2.89531°W	—	Late 18th century	A red brick house with a slate roof, two storeys and an attic, and two bays. The centre of the left bay projects slightly and has a small gable. It contains a doorway with a moulded surround, pilastered sidelights, and an open pediment. Above it is a two-light sash window, and in the gable is a small casement window. The right bay is wider, and contains a Venetian window in the ground floor, a three-light sash window above, and a large gabled dormer.	II
Cambrian Inn Public House; 52.90746°N 2.89611°W	—	Late 18th century	The public house is roughcast, with quoins, a cornice above the ground floor, a band above the middle floor, and a slate roof. There are three storeys and four bays. In the ground floor is a modern inn front, and above are sash windows in shaped stuccoed surrounds.	II
Sheraton House; 52.90632°N 2.89009°W	—	Late 18th century	A detached red brick house with a string course, a modillion eaves cornice, and a hipped slate roof. There are two storeys and attics, and a symmetrical front of five bays. The central doorway has a moulded surround with fluted pilasters, a fanlight with Gothic glazing, and a swagged and dentilled open pediment. Flanking and over the doorway are Venetian windows, the other windows in the upper floor are sashes, and in the attic are three dormers, one gabled, the others with hipped roofs. Named early in the 20th century after the Sheraton Family who lived here for a century . Century [6][34]	II*
Garden wall and gate piers, Sheraton House; 52.90636°N 2.88998°W	—	Late 18th century	The wall encloses the front garden, and is in brick with stone coping. In the centre is a pair of stone gate piers, each surmounted by a stone ball-head.	II
Sycamore House; 52.90581°N 2.89975°W	—	Late 18th century	A brick house with dentil eaves, and a roof with stone-coped gable ends. There are three storeys and three bays. In the centre is a gabled porch that has ornamental bargeboards and a finial. The windows are sashes with cambered heads.	II
15 Church Street; 52.90815°N 2.88968°W	—	1793	A detached brick house with a wooden moulded eaves cornice. There are three storeys and three bays, the middle bay projecting slightly and pedimented. The windows are sashes with plain lintels and keystones, and the central doorway has a moulded surround and a radial fanlight.	II*
25 Church Street; 52.90797°N 2.88911°W	—	c.1800	A red brick house with three storeys and three bays, with central bay slightly projecting and pedimented. Steps lead up to the central doorway, that has a moulded surround, pilasters, a radial fanlight, and an open pediment. The windows are sashes with plain lintels.	II
25 Cross Street; 52.90805°N 2.89330°W	—	c.1800	A shop in red brick with a slate roof, three storeys and two bays. The ground floor has been altered, and in the upper floors are sash windows with plain lintels.	II
4 Victoria Street; 52.90729°N 2.89620°W	—	c.1800	A stuccoed house with a slate roof, it has three storeys and three bays. The windows are sashes, and the central doorway has a moulded surround with pilasters, a rectangular fanlight, and an open pediment.	II
12 and 12A High Street; 52.90723°N 2.89314°W	—	Late 18th or early 19th century	A stuccoed shop with a storey band and a slate roof. There are three storeys and four bays. In the ground floor are modern shop fronts, and above are sash windows.	II
The Hollies and 46 Scotland Street; 52.90576°N 2.89899°W		c.1820	A pair of houses in brick, partly stuccoed, with slate roofs, two storeys and attics. No. 46 on the left has a two-storey canted bay window. The Hollies on the right has a plain gable, a wing to the right with an open arcade of four Roman Doric columns, and a pediment above. In the right return is a cast iron verandah with a balcony.	II
2 and 4 Church Street; 52.90816°N 2.89088°W	—	Early 19th century	A pair of red brick houses with a timber framed core and a slate roof, hipped to the right. There are two storeys and each house has two bays, a central doorway and horizontally-sliding sash windows.	II
12 and 14 Church Street; 52.90809°N 2.89040°W	—	Early 19th century	A house in red brick with corbelled eaves and a slate roof. It has three storeys, four bays, and a rear wing. The windows are sashes with plain lintels, the doorway has been altered, and in the rear wing are fragments of timber framing.	II
16 Church Street; 52.90805°N 2.89022°W	—	Early 19th century	The house has a timber framed core with a stuccoed front and a slate roof. There are two storeys and an attic, and four bays. In the ground floor are three moulded canted bay windows, one with a French window, and a doorway with a simple hood. The upper floor contains casement windows with keyblocks, and there are three box dormers.	II
21 and 23 Church Street; 52.90803°N 2.88930°W	—	Early 19th century	A pair of large houses in red brick with a slate roof, three storeys and five bays. The windows are sashes; in the ground floor they have round heads, in the middle floor segmental heads, and in the top floor square heads. Steps lead up to the two main doorways, each of which has pilasters, a three-light rectangular fanlight, and a cornice on consoles, and there is a plain passage doorway.	II
1 and 3 Cross Street; 52.90736°N 2.89383°W	—	Early 19th century	A pair of shops on a corner site, in red brick with dentil eaves and a slate roof. There are three storeys and a front of three bays. In the ground floor are modern shop fronts, and above are sash windows with plain lintels. At the rear of No. 1 is a two-storey wing incorporating earlier timber framing.	II
2 Cross Street and 1–5 High Street; 52.90731°N 2.89330°W	—	Early 19th century	A row of stuccoed shops on a corner site with a half-hipped slate roof. In High Street they have two storeys and a total of nine bays. In the ground floor are shop fronts and a doorway with a rectangular fanlight, and above are sash windows, and four hipped dormers. In Cross Street are three storeys, three bays, and a gabled dormer. No. 3 High Street contains exposed timber framing.	II
4–10 Cross Street; 52.90753°N 2.89343°W	—	Early 19th century	A row of four brick shops with plain and dentil eaves and slate roofs. There are three storeys and seven bays. In the ground floor are shop fronts, and above are casement windows.	II
5 and 9 Cross Street; 52.90749°N 2.89375°W	—	Early 19th century	A pair of red brick shops with moulding stone eaves, a slate roof, and three storeys. In the ground floor are modern shop fronts, and the windows are sashes, two in the middle floor and three in the top floor.	II
23 Cross Street; 52.90798°N 2.89336°W	—	Early 19th century	The building is in red brick with moulded stone eaves and a blocking course. There are three storeys and two bays. In the ground floor is a doorway with a moulded surround and a rectangular fanlight, combined with a shop front, all under a cornice. In the upper floors are sash windows with plain lintels.	II
4 and 6 High Street; 52.90721°N 2.89343°W	—	Early 19th century	A red brick building with moulded stone eaves and a slate roof. There are three storeys, No. 4 has two bays, and No. 6 has three. In the left bay is a doorway with a four-centred arched head, a radial fanlight, and a moulded surround with pilasters and side lights. The other bays contain modern shop fronts, and in the upper floors are sash windows.	II
8 and 10 High Street; 52.90722°N 2.89327°W	—	Early 19th century	A pair of shops in red brick with moulded stone eaves and a slate roof. There are three storeys and five bays. In the ground floor are shop fronts, to the left is a square-headed entrance, and above are sash windows.	II
6 St John's Hill; 52.90714°N 2.89238°W	—	Early 19th century	A brick house with corbelled eaves and a slate roof. It has three storeys, one bay, sash windows with cambered heads in the lower two floors, and a doorway with a plain surround.	II
10 and 12 St John's Hill; 52.90710°N 2.89217°W	—	Early 19th century	A pair of brick houses with three storeys and two bays. In the centre are paired doorways with moulded surrounds, each with a rectangular fanlight, and with an overall pediment. In the lower floors are sash windows, those in the ground floor in arched recesses, in the top floor the windows are casements, and above the doorways are two blocked windows.	II
11 St John's Hill; 52.90719°N 2.89203°W	—	Early 19th century	The house has an earlier timber framed core, it is encased in brick and rendered, and has a slate roof. There are two storeys and a right lean-to. Steps lead up to the door that has an open pedimented hood, and the windows are casements in projecting surrounds.	II
14 and 16 St John's Hill; 52.90708°N 2.89202°W	—	Early 19th century	A pair of brick houses with a slate roof. They have two storeys and attics, No. 14 has one bay, and No. 16 has two. The windows have cambered heads; some are casements, and others are horizontally-sliding sashes, and there are three gabled dormers. Above the doorway of No. 14 is a wooden openwork hood, there is a passage door to the right, and No. 16 has a triangular hood.	II
24 and 26 St John's Hill; 52.90698°N 2.89147°W	—	Early 19th century	A pair of stuccoed houses with a 17th-century timber framed core and a tile roof. There are two storeys and attics. Each house has a doorway with panelled pilasters and an open pediment, the windows are a mix of sashes and casements, and there are three gabled dormers.	II
1 and 3 Scotland Street; 52.90713°N 2.89388°W	—	Early 19th century	A pair of brick shops with moulded eaves and a slate roof. There are three storeys, and in each of the upper floors are three sash windows with shaped lintels. In the ground floor, No. 1 has a 19th-century moulded shop front with pilasters forming lateral doorways, and No. 3 has a modern shop front.	II
6 Scotland Street; 52.90720°N 2.89418°W	—	Early 19th century	A stuccoed shop with pseudo-quoins on the right, a modillion eaves cornice, and a blocking course. There are three storeys and two bays. In the ground floor is a modern shop front, and above are sash windows in moulded architraves. At the rear is a two-storey gabled wing with timber framing and plaster infill.	II
20 Scotland Street; 52.90688°N 2.89509°W	—	Early 19th century	A brick shop with a moulded stone eaves cornice and a blocking course. There are three storeys and three bays, the middle bay wider and recessed. In the ground floor is a 19th-century shop front. The central window in the middle bay is a casement, and the other windows are sashes; all the windows have segmental heads.	II
21 Scotland Street; 52.90640°N 2.89614°W	—	Early 19th century	The house incorporates an earlier timber framed building. It is in brick with a slate roof, there are two storeys, and it contains casement windows. On the west side is exposed timber framing.	II
23–29 Scotland Street; 52.90640°N 2.89639°W	—	Early 19th century	A row of four small brick cottages with dentil eaves and a slate roof. There are two storeys, each cottage has one bay, and there is an additional bay to the left over a segmental carriage arch. The doorways have plain surrounds, and the windows are sashes.	II
Outbuilding west of 46 Scotland Street; 52.90575°N 2.89946°W	—	Early 19th century	The building is in red brick with the gable end facing the street. In the ground floor is an entrance, and above it is an iron plate with initials, a date, and an armorial device.	II
63–67 Scotland Street; 52.90627°N 2.89720°W	—	Early 19th century	A terrace of three brick houses with a slate roof, two storeys, and one bay each. Each doorway has a semi-circular fanlight with a moulded surround, and the windows are casements with plain lintels.	II
7 Talbot Street; 52.90893°N 2.89202°W	—	Early 19th century	A red brick house with dentil eaves and a slate roof. There are three storeys and two bays. In the left bay is a doorway with a moulded surround, pilasters, a radial fanlight, and an open pediment, and the windows are sashes.	II
15 and 17 Talbot Street; 52.90865°N 2.89167°W	—	Early 19th century	A pair of houses incorporating earlier timber framed material. They are in brick with dentil eaves and have roofs of modern tiles. There are two storeys and two bays, and the windows are casements.	II
2 Trimpley Street; 52.90780°N 2.89704°W	—	Early 19th century	A red brick house with moulded stone eaves and a slate roof, two storeys and two bays. The windows are sashes, and in the centre is a blocked doorway with a keyed surround, the entrance being in a modern porch on the left return.	II
4 and 6 Trimpley Street; 52.90790°N 2.89724°W	—	Early 19th century	A pair of red brick houses with the gable end facing the street. There are two storeys and attics, and the entrances are on the side, each in a recessed arch. Each arch contains a doorway with a keyed surround and a rectangular fanlight, and a lunette in the upper floor. No. 4 has an iron trellised porch, No. 6 has a glazed porch, and in the attic is a dormered penthouse.	II
8 Trimpley Street; 52.90789°N 2.89752°W	—	Early 19th century	A stuccoed house with moulded stone eaves and a slate roof, two storeys and two bays. The windows are sashes, and the central doorway has a keyed surround and a rectangular fanlight. To the left is a lower two-storey wing, the former coach house, that has two openings with four-centred arched heads, and above is a casement window.	II
10 Trimpley Street; 52.90794°N 2.89772°W	—	Early 19th century	A stuccoed house with moulded stone eaves and a slate roof. There are two storeys and a symmetrical front of three bays. The central doorway has a moulded surround with pilasters, a radial fanlight, and an open pediment, and the windows are sashes.	II
11 and 13 Trimpley Street; 52.90763°N 2.89699°W	—	Early 19th century	A pair of houses in Regency style, in red brick, No. 13 is roughcast, and they have moulded stone eaves and a slate roof. There are two storeys, No. 11 has one bay, and No. 13 has two. The windows are sashes, No. 11 has an original doorway with a moulded surround, pilasters and a radial fanlight, No. 13 has a simpler surround and fanlight, and to the right is a passageway door.	II
15 Trimpley Street; 52.90767°N 2.89715°W	—	Early 19th century	A red brick house in Regency style, with moulded stone eaves and a slate roof. There are two storeys and two bays. The windows are sashes, and the doorway has a moulded surround with engaged fluted columns and a radial fanlight.	II
15–21 Watergate Street; 52.90781°N 2.89249°W	—	Early 19th century	A row of four brick houses with dentil eaves and slate roofs. The windows are sashes, most with cambered heads, and the doorways have rectangular fanlights.	II
25 and 27 Watergate Street; 52.90792°N 2.89231°W	—	Early 19th century	A pair of red brick houses with dentil eaves and a slate roof. There are two storeys, No. 25 has two bays, and No. 27 has one. The left bay of No. 25 contains a carriageway and casement window above, and in the right bay are a doorway, and a sash window in each floor. No. 27 has a shop front in the ground floor and a sash window above.	II
28–32 Watergate Street; 52.90786°N 2.89140°W	—	Early 19th century	A row of three brick cottages with slate roofs, forming an L-shaped plan. They have one storey and attics, and one bay each. The windows are casements, and each cottage has a gabled eaves dormer.	II
29 and 31 Watergate Street; 52.90794°N 2.89218°W	—	Early 19th century	A pair of roughcast houses with a moulded eaves cornice and a slate roof. There are three storeys, and each house has one bay. The doorways are plain, the windows in the ground floor are horizontally-sliding sashes, and above they are casements.	II
33 and 35 Watergate Street; 52.90797°N 2.89206°W	—	Early 19th century	A pair of brick houses with a tile roof, two storeys and one bay each. The doorways have plain surrounds, in the ground floor are sash windows, and in the upper floor the windows are casements.	II
34 and 36 Watergate Street; 52.90800°N 2.89126°W	—	Early 19th century	A pair of red brick houses with dentil eaves and slate roofs. There are two storeys, No. 34 has one bay, and No. 36 has two. The doorways have plain surrounds, No. 34 has modern windows, and in No. 36 are horizontally-sliding sash windows.	II
38–42 Watergate Street; 52.90813°N 2.89107°W	—	Early 19th century	A row of three red brick houses with a slate roof, two storeys and four bays. The doorways have plain surrounds, and the windows are sashes.	II
2 Willow Street; 52.90788°N 2.89508°W	—	Early 19th century	A red brick house with moulded eaves and a slate roof. There are two storeys and a symmetrical front of three bays. The central doorway has a moulded surround with pilasters, a semicircular fanlight, and an open pediment. The windows are sashes with plain lintels, those in the ground floor with three lights.	II
4 and 6 Willow Street; 52.90774°N 2.89516°W	—	Early 19th century	A pair of symmetrical brick houses, with moulded stone eaves and a slate roof. They have two storeys and each house has two bays. In the centre of each is a doorway with pilasters, and between them is a round-arched passageway. The windows are sashes with moulded lintels.	II
13 and 15 Willow Street; 52.90804°N 2.89461°W	—	Early 19th century	A pair of red brick houses with corbelled eaves and a slate roof. There are three storeys and four bays. The right three bays are symmetrical, and contain a central pair of doorways under an overall pediment, and the left bay contains a segmental-arched carriage entry. The windows in the lower two floors are sashes, in the top floor they are casements, and the windows above the doorway are in a recessed arch. At the rear is a single-storey wing containing timber framing.	II
21 Willow Street; 52.90786°N 2.89478°W	—	Early 19th century	A small stuccoed detached house with a wooden modillion eaves cornice and a hipped slate roof. There are two storeys and a symmetrical front of two bays. The central doorway has pilasters and a pediment, and above it is a moulded plaster escutcheon. The windows are casements.	II
25 Willow Street and Annexe; 52.90777°N 2.89483°W	—	Early 19th century	The house is in red brick, and has a storey band, dentil eaves, and a slate roof. There are three storeys and three bays. In the centre is a cast iron trellised porch, and the windows are sashes, those in the middle floor in arched recesses. The annexe is a two-storey wing to the rear, and has a doorway with pilasters and a cornice hood on consoles.	II
Beaumont; 52.90835°N 2.89086°W	—	Early 19th century	A detached red brick house with a moulded stone cornice and blocking course, and a slate roof. There are three storeys and four bays. The doorway in the third bay has a wooden moulded surround with pilasters and a radial fanlight, and a door with ogee panels. The windows above the doorway are blocked, and the others are sashes with plain lintels and keystones. In front of the forecourt are iron railings.	II
Black Lion Hotel; 52.90705°N 2.89454°W		Early 19th century	The hotel is stuccoed, the ground floor is rusticated, there is a dentilled cornice above the ground floor, modillion eaves, and a slate roof. It has three storeys and five bays. Above the central doorway is a canted oriel window with an ornamental parapet. The windows in the upper floors are sashes, those in the middle floor having cornice hoods on giant consoles. To the left is a three-bay wing containing a modern shop front and a passageway.	II
Canal warehouse 52.90519°N 2.89494°W		Early 19th century	The warehouse stands by a branch of the Llangollen Canal. It is in red brick with a slate roof, and has three storeys and three bays. The ground floor facing the canal has three blocked openings, and each upper storey has a central loading door flanked by windows with segmental heads. In the north gable end is a porch, and the south gable end contains a loading canopy.	II
Ivy House; 52.90575°N 2.89849°W	—	Early 19th century	A detached brick house with dentil eaves, and a slate roof, it has three storeys and three bays. The doorway has a moulded surround with pilasters and a rectangular fanlight. The windows are sashes with cambered heads, those in the right bay with three lights.	II
Lloyds Bank Buildings; 52.90727°N 2.89401°W		Early 19th century	The building is on a corner site, it is in red brick with stone dressings, and has a moulded stone cornice. There are three storeys, four bays on Scotland Street, four on Market Street, and three on the curved corner between them. The ground floor is stuccoed, and in the upper floors are pilasters and sash windows.	II
Mounting block east of The Mount; 52.90743°N 2.89103°W	—	Early 19th century (probable)	The mounting block consists of a large block of stone with three steps cut into one side.	II
Old Fire Station; 52.90860°N 2.89292°W	—	Early 19th century	The former fire station, since altered, is in red brick, and has three storeys, and a two-storey wing at the rear. There is a gabled front, containing one window and modern folding doors.	II
Red Lion Public House; 52.90802°N 2.89005°W		Early 19th century	The public house is stuccoed on earlier timber framing, the ground floor is rusticated, there is a moulded cornice between the floors, quoins on the angles, and a modillion eaves cornice. The main block has two storeys and an attic, and three bays, the middle bay slightly projecting and pedimented. The central doorway has a moulded surround, a rectangular fanlight, and a canopy. The windows are sashes with plain keyblocks and lintels. To the left is a two-storey three-bay wing containing an elliptical archway, and to the right of the main block is a square-headed passageway with a dormer above.	II
Stanham; 52.90738°N 2.89831°W	—	Early 19th century	A large house in Regency style, stuccoed, with moulded eaves and a slate roof. There are two storeys and three bays, the middle bay gabled and containing a portico with four Roman Doric columns. The windows are sashes, and attached to the south side is a Gothic conservatory.	II
The Ellesmere; 52.90736°N 2.89281°W	—	Early 19th century	The hotel, formerly the Bridgewater Arms, is stuccoed with sash windows and a slate roof. The range along High Street has modillion eaves, two storeys and an attic and seven bays, the ground floor is rusticated, the windows in the ground floor have plain lintels and keystones, there are five box dormers, and in the centre is an arched passageway. The block curving round the corner to Watergate Street has three storeys and four bays. At the rear is a wing containing timber framing.	II
The Mount; 52.90745°N 2.89134°W	—	Early 19th century	A larger detached house in red brick with moulded eaves and a hipped slate roof. It has three storeys, a symmetrical front of three bays, the middle bay projecting slightly and pedimented. The central doorway has a moulded surround with pilasters, a rectangular fanlight, and a canopy on iron trellis supports, and the windows are sashes.	II
Fulwood House (Ellesmere Branch Library); 52.90719°N 2.89596°W		c. 1830–40	The house formerly the public library and now offices . It is stuccoed, with quoins and a storey band. There are three storeys, three bays, and a two-storey wing on the left. In the centre is a Tuscan porch, and above it is a two-storey rusticated arch. The windows in the ground floor have round heads and rusticated surrounds, and above are sash windows with channelled lintels.	II
Town Hall; 52.90716°N 2.89369°W		1833	The old town hall, designed by Edward Haycock, is in Grinshill sandstone. It has two storeys, the ground floor is rusticated, and it has a front of three bays. The ground floor is now an Estate Agents arcaded with two semicircular-headed windows and a doorway. In the upper floor are sash windows with moulded architraves and panelled aprons. At the top is a plain frieze and a pediment containing a clock face.The vault below is a bar.	II
7 and 9 Church Street; 52.90829°N 2.89036°W	—	Early to mid 19th century	A pair of houses in cottage orné style with engraved stucco, quoins, a sill band, projecting eaves, and a slate roof. There are two storeys and four bays. The windows are sashes, with channelled lintels in the ground floor, and shaped surrounds in the upper floor. The doorway of No. 7 has a plain surround, and No. 9 has a gabled porch wit elaborately carved bargeboards and a finial.	II
12 Cross Street; 52.90869°N 2.89315°W	—	Early to mid 19th century	A detached red brick house that has eaves on console brackets and a hipped slate roof. There are two storeys and three bays. In the centre is a pedimented porch, and a doorway with a moulded surround, pilasters, and a rectangular fanlight. The windows are sashes, those in the ground floor with segmental heads.	II
18–22 St John's Hill; 52.90703°N 2.89184°W	—	Early to mid 19th century	A pair of brick houses with a slate roof, three storeys and four bays. There is one sash window, a canted bay window in the right house, and the other windows are casements, the windows in the lower two floors are in two-storey recessed arches. The left doorway has a pedimented hood, and the other doorway has a simpler hood.	II
37 Watergate Street; 52.90799°N 2.89192°W	—	Early to mid 19th century	A red brick house with a slate roof, three storeys and three bays. The central doorway has pilasters, a rectangular fanlight, and a cornice hood on brackets. Flanking it are rectangular bay windows with cornices, and above are sash windows with plain lintels.	II
43 Cross Street; 52.90872°N 2.89364°W	—	c. 1840	A police station, later a private house, in red brick with moulded eaves, and a hipped slate roof. There are two storeys and two bays. The central doorway has pilasters, a radial fanlight, and a plain entablature with a cornice. The windows are sashes in stuccoed architraves, with cambered heads, keystones, and sills on brackets.	II
12 and 14 Trimpley Street; 52.90802°N 2.89807°W	—	c. 1840	A pair of brick houses with a slate roof. There are two storeys, seven bays, the left bay gabled, and a former gabled coach house to the right. The doorways are round-headed with a stuccoed surround, and each has a radial fanlight. The windows are sashes, those above the doorways being painted replicas. The coach house has a square-headed entrance, a passage door to the left, and a circular window in the gable.	II
Former Savings Bank; 52.90678°N 2.89486°W	—	c. 1840	The savings bank, later used for other purposes, is in Italianate style, it is stuccoed, and has quoins, a moulded cornice between the floors, an inscribed frieze, a modillion cornice, and a blocking course. There are two storeys and a symmetrical front of three bays. The central doorway has pilasters, and a semicircular head and fanlight. The windows are sashes with architraves, those in the upper floor with cornice hoods on consoles.	II
11 and 13 Church Street; 52.90822°N 2.88988°W	—	Mid 19th century	A pair of small brick houses with corbelled eaves, and a slate roof. There is one storey with attics, and three bays. The windows are three-light casements with segmental heads, and there are three gabled dormers.	II
19 Church Street; 52.90808°N 2.88950°W	—	Mid 19th century	The house probably has an 18th-century core. It is in painted brick with corbelled eaves and a slate roof. There are two storeys and an attic, and three bays. The central doorway has a rectangular fanlight and a segmental head, and it is flanked by canted bay windows. In the upper floor are sash windows with segmental heads.	II
5 Scotland Street; 52.90703°N 2.89418°W	—	Mid 19th century	A red brick shop with modillion eaves and a slate roof. There are three storeys and two bays. In the ground floor is a doorway with a moulded surround and a semicircular fanlight, to the right is a modern shop front, and above are sash windows.	II
19 Talbot Street; 52.90866°N 2.89155°W	—	Mid 19th century	A brick house incorporating earlier timber framing, with two storeys. A single bay faces the street, and the rendered entrance front has three bays, quoins, and two bay windows. The other windows are sashes.	II
The Vicarage; 52.90713°N 2.89007°W	—	Mid 19th century	A red brick house with a slate roof, three storeys and three bays. The porch has twin brick pilasters, a stepped frieze, and a broad pediment, the doorway has a rectangular fanlight, and the windows are sashes.	II
Former Ellesmere railway station 52.90923°N 2.89956°W		1863	The station was built for the Oswestry, Ellesmere and Whitchurch Railway. It is in brick with sandstone dressings, quoins, and Welsh slate roofs. There are two storeys, and a south front of eight bays, the two outer bays on each side projecting and gabled.	II
4–26 Wharf Road; 52.90636°N 2.89471°W		c. 1890	A terrace of workers' houses in red brick with tiled roofs. They have two storeys, there is a gable at the left end, and slightly projecting gables in the centre and at the right. The windows are iron casements in stone surrounds with chamfered heads, and the doorways have pointed arched heads.	II
