= Lyneal =

Village in Shropshire, England

Coordinates: 52.8942°N 2.8259°W

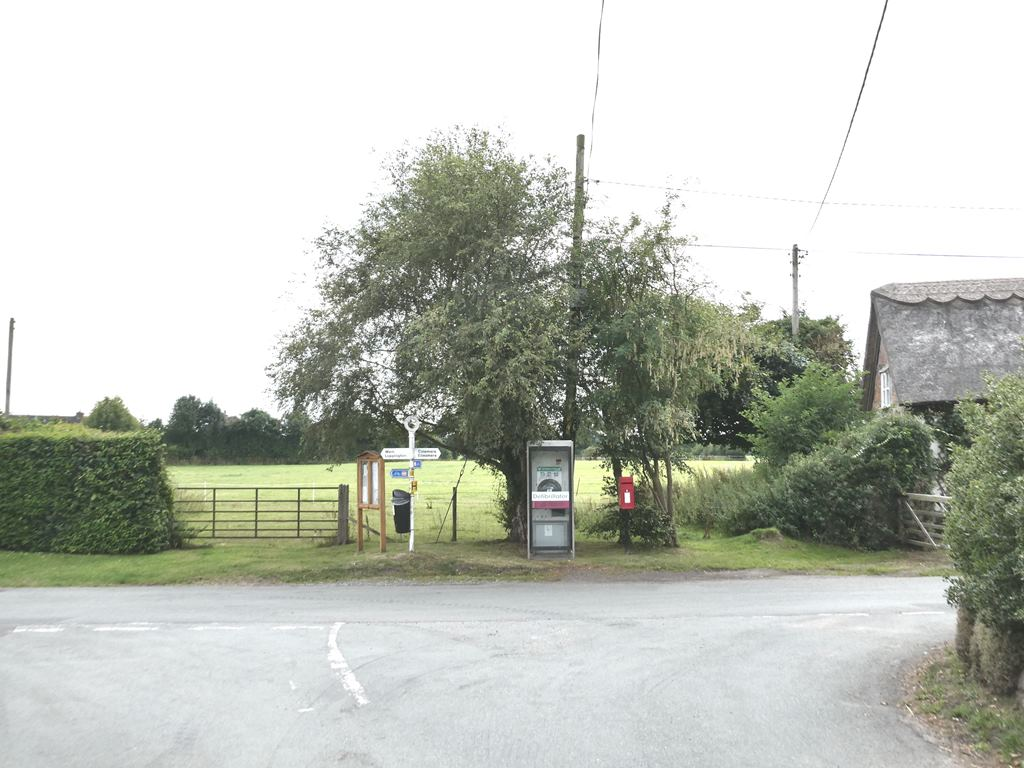
- Signpost and telephone box in the centre of Lyneal

- Location within Shropshire
- Civil parish: Welshampton and Lyneal
- Unitary authority: Shropshire
- Ceremonial county: Shropshire
- Region: West Midlands
- Country: England
- Sovereign state: United Kingdom

Lyneal is a small village in the civil parish of Welshampton and Lyneal, in Shropshire, England. The centre of the village is a road junction which features a phone box, community noticeboard, and a old-fashioned fingerpost signpost pointing to nearby villages.

Its earliest recorded name was Lunval. It has also been known as Lineal.

John Bartholomew described it in 1887 in an entry in his Gazetteer of the British Isles thus: "Lineal cum Colemere, eccl. dist., Ellesmere and Welsh Hampton pars., Shropshire, pop. 367; contains Lineal, hamlet, 3 miles S.E. of Ellesmere; P.O., called Lyneal."

It was formerly part of the parish of Lyneal cum Colemere. According to Edward Cassey and Co.'s 1871 History, Gazetteer, and Directory of Shropshire,

"LYNEAL CUM COLEMERE are two villages and townships forming a new parish recently taken out of the parish of Ellesmere. The church is a beautiful specimen of Gothic architecture on a small scale. It was built at a cost of about 2,500 by Lady Marian Alford as a memorial church to her son the late Earl Brownlow it is dedicated to St John the Evangelist and will afford sitting accommodation to 220 persons the seats are all free. The living is a vicarage value 164 per annum in the gift of Earl Brownlow and held by the Rev R Lundin Brown MA. The village of COLEMERE is nearly three miles cast by south from Ellesmere. The township contains 1,440 acres of land the property of Earl Brownlow. LYNEAL is a township and village three miles south east from Ellesmere. The township contains 1,897 acres of land. Wyneal Wood is a farm in the occupation of Mr Andrew Bickley. At Lyneal there is a school for boys and girls."

The nearby St John the Evangelist Church Lyneal with Colemere has a memorial to the dead of World War I, recording the names of 11 men who died from the ecclesiastical parish of Lyneal with Colemere.
