= St Michael and All Angels' Church, Welshampton =

Church of St Michael and All Angels, Welshampton
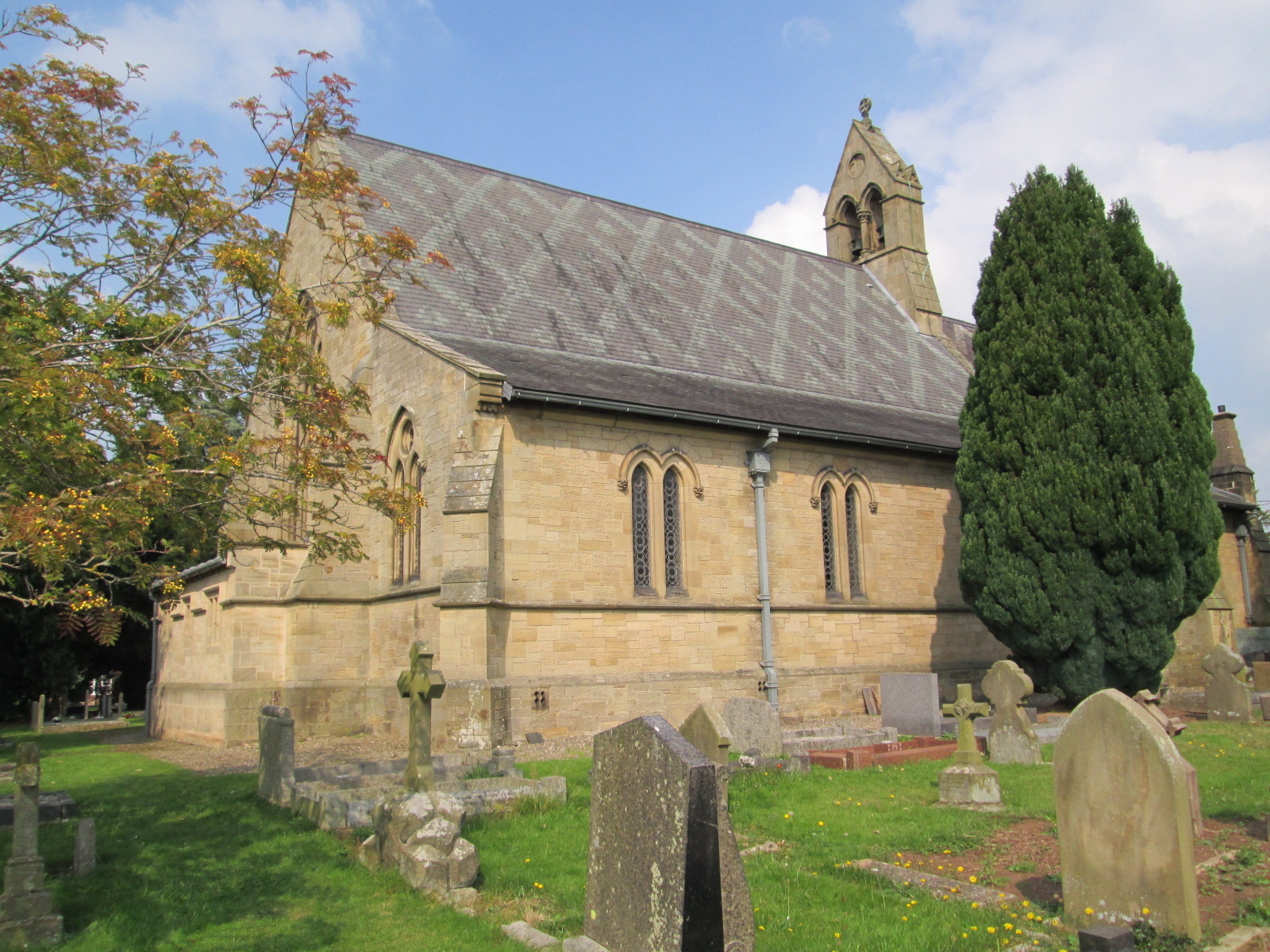
- Church of St Michael and All Angels, Welshampton
- 52.9099°N 2.8423°W
- OS grid reference: SJ 434 350
- Location: Welshampton
- Country: England
- Denomination: Church of England

History
- Dedication: Saint Michael and All Angels

Architecture
- Heritage designation: Grade II
- Designated: 27 May 1953
- Architect: George Gilbert Scott
- Style: Early English style
- Completed: 1863

Administration
- Diocese: Diocese of Lichfield
- Deanery: Ellesmere Deanery

The Church of St Michael and All Angels is a Grade II listed Anglican church in the village of Welshampton in Shropshire.

It was built in the 1860s for Frances Mainwaring and Salusbury Kynaston Mainwaring, in memory of Charles Kynaston Mainwaring of Oteley. The architect was George Gilbert Scott. There was originally a medieval church, which was replaced in 1788 by a church for Mary Kynaston of Oteley; this was replaced by Scott's church.

== Building ==
The walls are of yellow sandstone ashlar; it has a slate roof which has a lozenge pattern over the nave and a zig-zag pattern over the chancel. The chancel has a semicircular apsidal shape. There are buttresses at the corners of the church and against the chancel. On the roof at the junction of the nave and chancel is a bellcote.

The church has lancet windows. The stained glass includes, in a west window a commemoration of Charles Kynaston Mainwaring, and in the north-west window of the nave a commemoration of Jeremiah Libopuoa Moshueshue (see below).

== The link with Lesotho ==
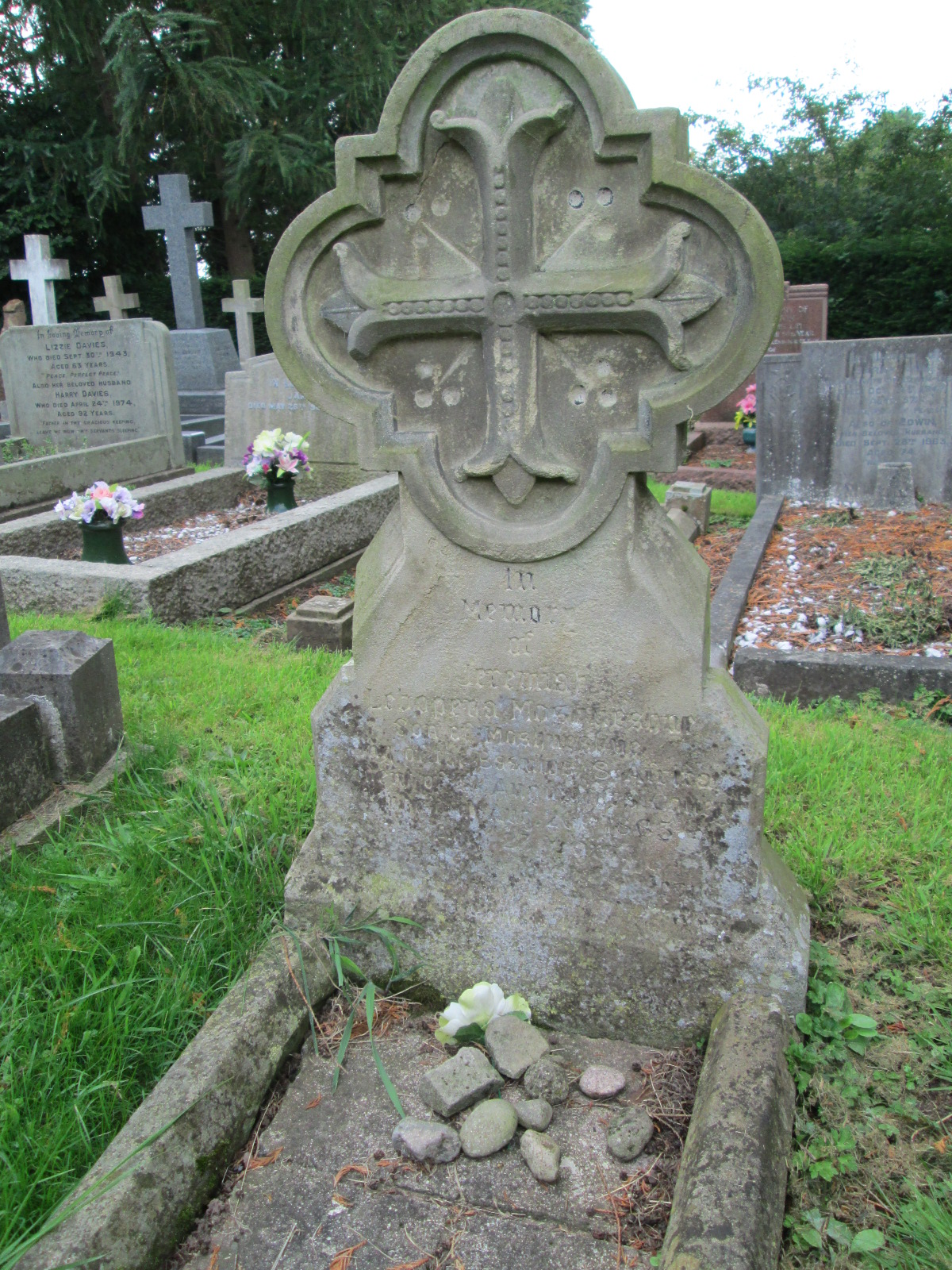
The grave of Jeremiah Libopuoa Moshueshue

In the churchyard is buried an African prince, Jeremiah Libopuoa Moshueshue (1839-1863). He was a son of Moshueshue I of Lesotho.

The history of this link with Lesotho (at that time known as Basutoland) began when the vicar of Welshampton, Thomas Buckley-Owen, was offered a post in Lesotho. He turned it down because the new church in Welshampton would soon be complete; however, he maintained contact with the country. Moshueshue I sent two of his junior sons to study at an Anglican school in Zonnebloem. One of them, Jeremiah Libopuoa, came to England to train as a priest. He visited Welshampton when the new church was consecrated in 1863; during the visit he caught a fever and died.

In 2010 Queen 'Masenate Mohato Seeiso of Lesotho visited the church, where she attended a service and paid respects to the grave of prince Jeremiah Libopuoa.

== See also ==
- Listed buildings in Welshampton and Lyneal
