= Ellesmere, Shropshire =

Town in Shropshire, England

Coordinates: 52.9082°N 2.8944°W

Ellesmere
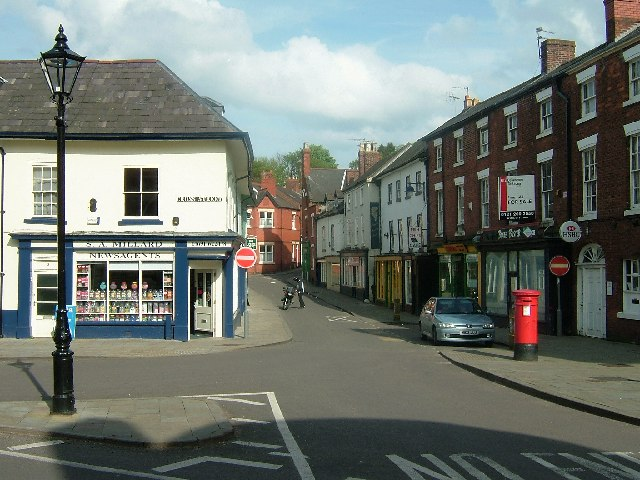
- Ellesmere town centre

- Location within Shropshire
- Population: 4,419 (Ellesmere Urban parish, 2021)
- OS grid reference: SJ398349
- Civil parish: Ellesmere Urban
- Unitary authority: Shropshire
- Ceremonial county: Shropshire
- Region: West Midlands
- Country: England
- Sovereign state: United Kingdom
- Post town: ELLESMERE
- Postcode district: SY12
- Dialling code: 01691
- Police: West Mercia
- Fire: Shropshire
- Ambulance: West Midlands
- UK Parliament: North Shropshire

Ellesmere (/ˈɛlzmɪər/ ELZ-meer) is a town in the civil parish of Ellesmere Urban, in Shropshire, England; it is located near to the Welsh border, the towns of Oswestry and Whitchurch, and the Welsh city of Wrexham. It is notable for its proximity to a number of prominent meres.

== History ==
The name Ellesmere derives from the Old English ellismere meaning 'Elli's mere'.

Ellesmere Castle was probably an 11th-century motte-and-bailey castle most likely built by either Roger de Montgomerie, 1st Earl of Shrewsbury, or his son Roger the Poitevin at Castlefields overlooking the Mere. Only its earthworks now remain, with the top of the motte being used for the bowling green, which still commands a fine view.

In 1114, King Henry I gave Ellesmere to William Peverel as a part of the Maelor, which included Overton and Whittington at that time. His descendants retained Ellesmere until apparently the late 1140s when the lordship was acquired, probably by force, by Madog ap Maredudd of Powys. Madog died in 1160 and Ellesmere came into the hands of King Henry II.

In 1177 King Henry II gave the manors of Ellesmere and Hales in England to Dafydd ab Owain Gwynedd (who already had a castle at Rhuddlan and was, by this time, the sole ruler of Gwynedd. Earlier, in the summer of 1174, Dafydd had married Emme of Anjou, half sister of Henry, and sister of Hamelin de Warenne, Earl of Surrey, both illegitimate children of Geoffrey V, Count of Anjou). Dafydd remained Lord of Ellesmere until his death in 1203.

In mid-April 1205, Llywelyn the Great married Joan, Lady of Wales illegitimate daughter of King John and Ellesmere was given to them as a wedding gift. Llywelyn's mother was Marared (Margaret), daughter of Madog ap Maredudd, Prince of Powys. There is evidence that, after her first husband Iorwerth's death, Marared married in the summer of 1197, Gwion, the nephew of Roger Powys of Whittington Castle. She seems to have pre-deceased her husband, after bearing him a son, David ap Gwion, and therefore there can be no truth in the story that she later married into the Corbet family of Caus Castle (near Westbury, Shropshire) and later, Moreton Corbet Castle. Ellesmere was ordered to be attacked by King Henry III in 1231, but Llywelyn retained control of the lordship until his death in 1240. In 1241 King Henry III ordered John le Strange to repair the wooden castle of Ellesmere.

The lordship appears to have later passed into the hands of Llywelyn ap Gruffudd or his brother Dafydd ap Gruffydd, grandsons of Llywelyn ab Iorwerth and last of the native Princes of Wales. The castle fell to royal troops from Chester during March 1282.

In 1287, Oliver Ingham, who was an English commander and administrator in Aquitaine during the War of Saint-Sardos and early Hundred Years War was born in Ellesmere and granted custody of Ellesmere Castle in 1321. His daughter Joan married Robert ("Roger") le Strange, 4th Baron Strange, son of Lord Strange of Knockin and Isolda de Walton.

By 1294, the preceptory of Dolgynwal (Ysbyty Ifan, Denbighshire, on the banks of the River Conwy) had been united with Halston, which was subsequently the administrative centre for all Knights Hospitaller estates in North Wales. Dolgynwal, which had been founded c. 1190, had acquired Ellesmere Church, its most substantial property, from Llywelyn the Great in 1225

In 1435, Griffin Kynaston, Seneschal of the Lordship of Ellesmere, (born at Stocks of landed gentry – descended from the princes of Powys), gave evidence at Shrewsbury to confirm the age of John Burgh, Lord of Mowthey, sponsored by Lord John Talbot, 1st Earl of Shrewsbury, Lieutenant of Ireland. Griffin's fourth son, Sir Roger Kynaston, was appointed for life as Escheator and Sheriff of Merioneth and became Constable of Harlech Castle and Sheriff of Shropshire. Humphrey Kynaston, the son of Roger and his second wife Elizabeth Grey was, in 1491, declared an outlaw by King Henry VII and took shelter in a cave in the west point of Nesscliffe Rock, called to this day "Kynaston's Cave". He was pardoned in 1493.

The former Marcher Lordship of Ellesmere (formerly a Hundred in its own right) was annexed to Shropshire and the Hundred of Pymhill by section 11 of the Laws in Wales Act 1535.

Francis Egerton, 1st Earl of Ellesmere, was born Lord Francis Leveson-Gower, in London in 1800. A patron of the arts, in 1848 he purchased at auction for 355 guineas from the estate of Richard Temple-Grenville, 2nd Duke of Buckingham and Chandos, the only known (or suspected) portrait of William Shakespeare in existence. Ellesmere Island in Canada was named after him.

There was a tannery located on the edge of the Mere in what is now known as Cremorne Gardens. These gardens were given to the people of Ellesmere by Lord Brownlow who was heavily involved in the Edward VIII abdication crisis of 1936.

== Commerce ==
North Shropshire and the Cheshire Plain has always been a region well suited to dairy produce, and Ellesmere was a thriving market town with several fairs during the year in which dairy produce and livestock were sold. The Shrewsbury to Wrexham turnpike road, passing through Ellesmere, was created in 1752 which used tolls to maintain the road, and so improved transport. Later turnpike roads connected Ellesmere to Whitchurch and Oswestry. The opportunities for trade further increased from 1805 when Ellesmere gained its canal connection to Ellesmere Port and hence to the port of Liverpool, where ships sailed to all parts of the world. In 1806 a July Fair was introduced (in addition to the regular fairs in February, April, August and November) this being for the sale of "horned cattle, horses, pigs, sheep, leather, grain, butter, cheese, wool, bacon, hops, and every other produce of land". The Ellesmere Canal was said to offer speedy and safe conveyance to Chester, Liverpool, Manchester, etc., and North Wales, with the Earl of Bridgewater erecting wharves and warehouses on the canal. The canal gave access to bulky materials, such as timbers for building, iron, and coal, and allowed the building of an adjacent gas works. At the head of the canal was an iron foundry, Bridgewater Foundry, which manufactured agricultural implements and also some of the ironwork required by the canal.

In 1863 Ellesmere gained railway access when the new line arrived from Whitchurch. In July 1864 the extension of the line to Oswestry was completed, and in 1895 the line opened from Ellesmere to Wrexham. The station had a large goods yard, and a siding to a livestock dock. A new cattle market was opened adjacent to the cattle dock in December 1869.

In particular the Ellesmere area was known for its cheese making, and a considerable proportion of Cheshire cheese was made in North Shropshire. In 1909, following the death of its owner, William Clay, the foundry was closed and the works auctioned. This location was later to become the site for a cheese factory which by the 1930s was the largest employer in Ellesmere. The cheese factory continued as a major employer until its closure in January 1987, with the loss of 329 jobs.

== Geography ==
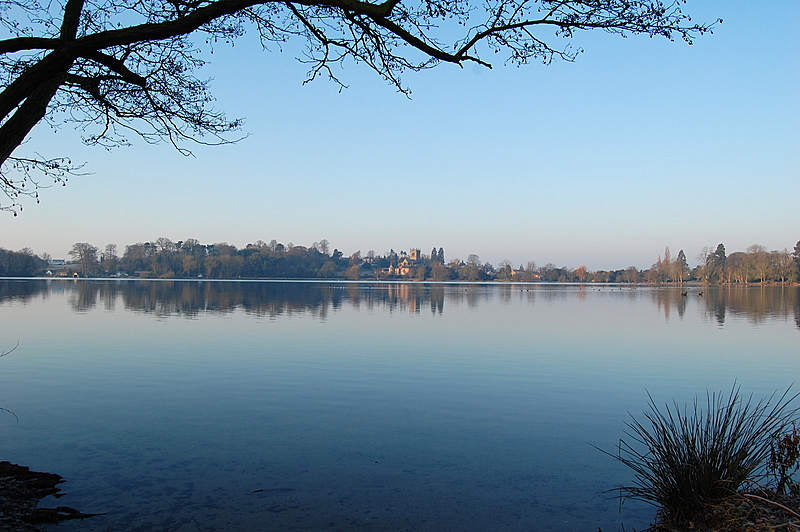
The Mere

The town is located by the side of Ellesmere (aka 'the Mere'), one of the largest natural meres in England outside the Lake District and one of nine glacial meres in the area. ('glacial' means that the depression occupied by the mere was the location of a block of ice that persisted at the end of the last ice age). These meres are different from those in the Lake District in that they do not have a flow of water into them to maintain the level.

An artificial island in the Mere was constructed in 1812 from soil dug out during the making of the gardens at Ellesmere House. This was later named Moscow Island, as Napoleon was forced to retreat from Moscow that year. The Mere has a visitors' centre and is popular with birdwatchers, many of whom visit to see grey herons nesting. There are eight other meres nearby: Blakemere, Colemere, Crosemere, Kettlemere, Newtonmere, Whitemere, Sweatmere and Hanmer Mere.

== Governance ==
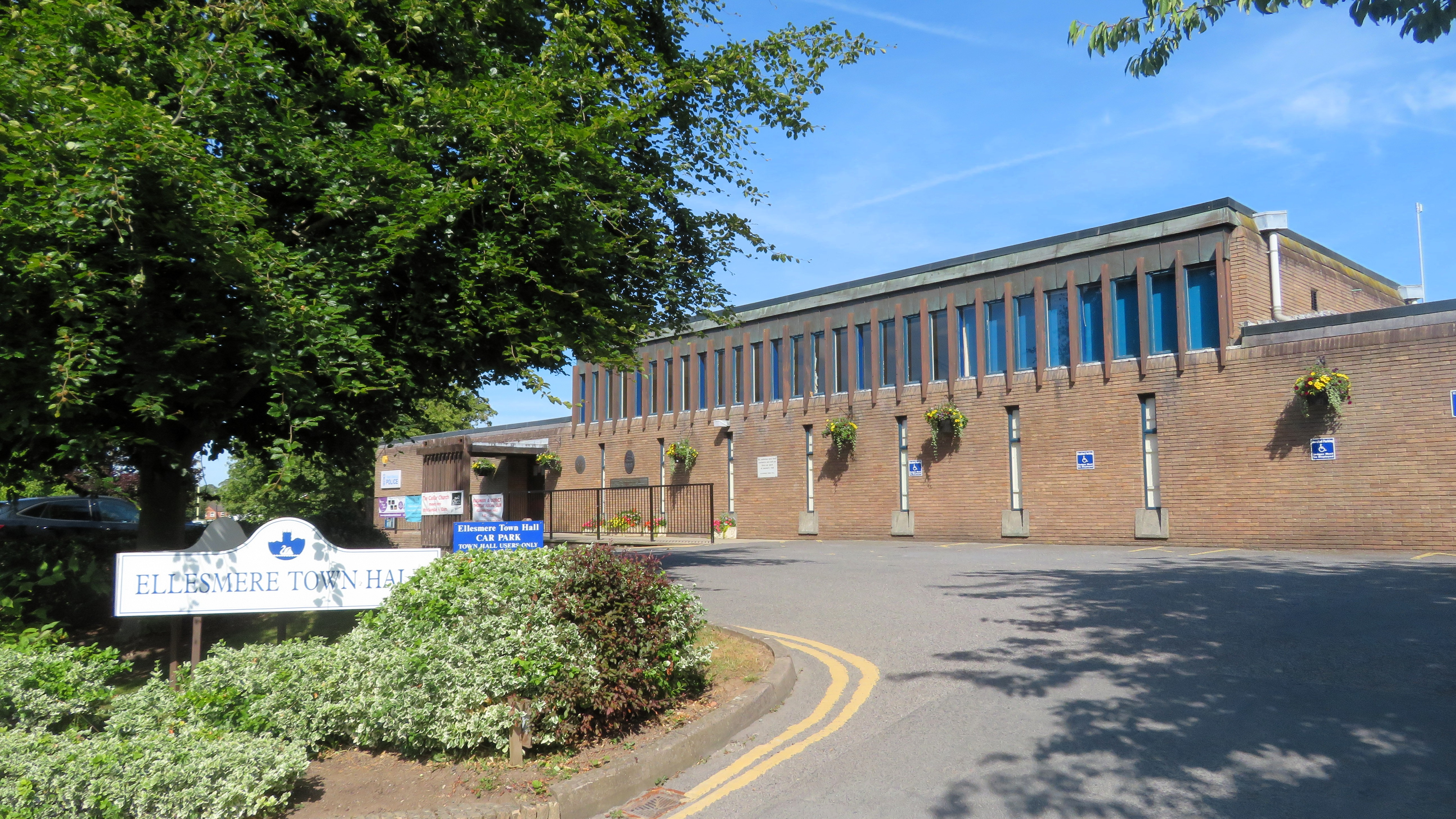
Town Hall, Willow Street

There are two tiers of local government covering Ellesmere, at parish and unitary authority level: Ellesmere Town Council and Shropshire Council. The town council is based at Ellesmere Town Hall on Willow Street, which was completed in 1968.

=== Administrative history ===
Ellesmere was an ancient parish, which historically covered an extensive area and straddled the Pimhill hundred of Shropshire and the Maelor hundred of Flintshire. The parish was subdivided into numerous townships, including an Ellesmere township covering the central part of the parish around the town itself. From the 17th century onwards, parishes were gradually given various civil functions under the poor laws, in addition to their original ecclesiastical functions. In some cases, the civil functions were exercised by subdivisions of the parish rather than the parish as a whole. In the case of Ellesmere, the parish was split into three parts for administering the poor laws: the township or chapelry of Penley (being the part of the parish in Flintshire), the township of Cockshutt, and the rest of the parish. In 1866, the legal definition of 'parish' was changed to be the areas used for administering the poor laws, and so Cockshutt, Penley and Ellesmere became separate civil parishes.

The Ellesmere township was made a local government district in 1859, governed by an elected local board. Such districts were reconstituted as urban districts under the Local Government Act 1894. The 1894 Act also directed that civil parishes could no longer straddle district boundaries, and so the parish was split into an Ellesmere Urban parish matching the urban district, and an Ellesmere Rural parish covering the remainder. At the 1891 census (the last before the abolition of the civil parish), Ellesmere had a population of 5507.

Ellesmere Urban District was abolished in 1967, when its area was redesignated as a rural parish (but retaining the name 'Ellesmere Urban') and placed in the new North Shropshire Rural District. The rural district was replaced by the larger North Shropshire district in 1974. That district was in turn abolished in 2009. Shropshire County Council then took over district-level functions, making it a unitary authority, and was renamed Shropshire Council. The civil parish covering the town is still officially called Ellesmere Urban, but its parish council omits the 'urban' from its name, calling itself Ellesmere Town Council.

== Transport ==
The A495 and A528 roads cross at Ellesmere. The latter runs 15 miles south-southeast from Ellesmere to the county town, Shrewsbury.

The town lies beside the Llangollen Canal with a short side arm reaching the town centre wharf. The canal eventually terminates just outside Llangollen at Llantysilio after passing through the 18 km World Heritage Site which includes Chirk Aqueduct and Pontcysyllte Aqueduct. It was originally known as the Ellesmere Canal. Thomas Telford was overall director of its construction. Work lasted from 1793 to 1805 with the aim of linking Chester on the River Dee and the River Mersey at Ellesmere Port (named after the town) with Shrewsbury, but it never got that far due to rising costs and completion of alternative routes which later became the Shropshire Union Canal. During its construction, Telford lived in a house next to the canal in Ellesmere, which still stands today.

Ellesmere no longer has a railway, but it was once on the Oswestry, Ellesmere and Whitchurch Railway main line of the Cambrian Railways. However, the section from Whitchurch to Welshpool (Buttington Junction), via Ellesmere, Whittington, Oswestry and Llanymynech, closed on 18 January 1965 in favour of the more viable alternative route via Shrewsbury. Ellesmere was also the terminus of the Wrexham and Ellesmere Railway branch line to Wrexham (Central), via Overton-on-Dee, Bangor-on-Dee and Marchwiel. This line closed on 10 September 1962. Ellesmere railway station still stands albeit derelict and disused. The nearest active station to Ellesmere is Gobowen for Oswestry which is about 8 miles away.

Bus services are operated by Arriva Midlands, Lakeside Coaches and Tanat Valley Coaches. The main services are as follows:

- 53 to Oswestry via Dudleston Heath, St. Martin's, Gobowen and the Orthopaedic Hospital – every 40 minutes Monday to Saturday (Arriva Midlands);
- 205 Town Service (Tuesdays and Fridays) (Lakeside Coaches)
- 449 to Oswestry via Welsh Frankton and Whittington – roughly hourly Monday – Saturday, with 3 journeys daily continuing from Ellesmere to Welshampton (Lakeside Coaches, with Arriva Midlands operating the three Welshampton services: one in the morning and two in the evening);
- 501 to Shrewsbury via Cockshutt, Myddle (most but not all) and Harmer Hill – roughly hourly (Lakeside coaches).

== Landmarks ==
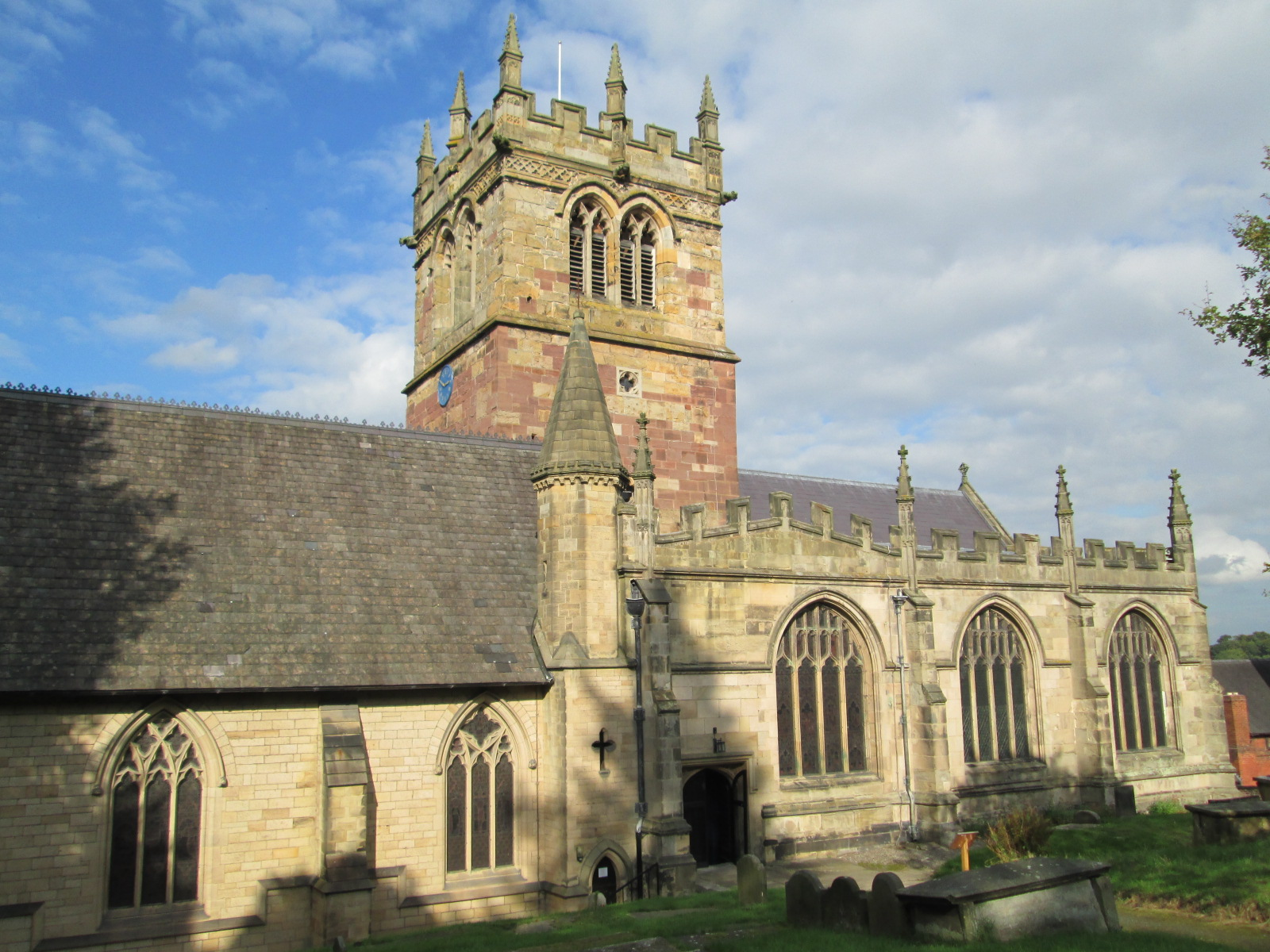
St Mary's Church

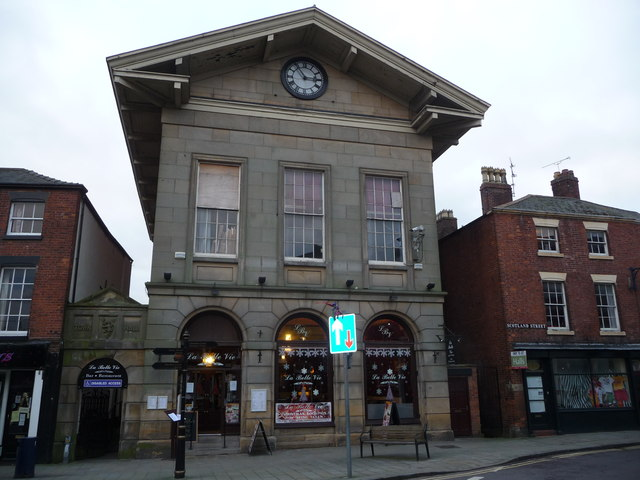
The Old Town Hall

- St Mary's Church – of Norman origin but largely rebuilt by Sir George Gilbert Scott in 1849. A grade I listed building.
- The Old Town Hall – built in 1833. A grade II listed building.

== Education ==
The town has two schools. Ellesmere Primary School is a primary and nursery school for boys and girls aged 4–11. In 2013 Lakelands School became an academy. Lakelands Academy provides state-paid education for boys and girls in the 11–16 age range (for whom schooling is compulsory) and its former pupils include Luke Preston. Several other nearby schools serve the wider community, such as Welshampton Church of England School.

A short distance outside the town is Ellesmere College, a public (i.e., private) boarding school founded in 1884 by Canon Nathaniel Woodard for sons of the middle classes. It is now a fully co-educational school catering for pupils from 7–18.

== Media ==
Local news and television programmes are BBC West Midlands and ITV Central. Television signals are received from the Wrekin TV transmitters. Local radio stations are BBC Radio Shropshire, Hits Radio Black Country & Shropshire, Greatest Hits Radio Black Country & Shropshire, Smooth West Midlands, Heart West Midlands, and Capital North West and Wales. The Border Counties Advertizer and Shropshire Star are the town's local newspapers.

== Sport ==
The town also has a semi-professional football club, Ellesmere Rangers FC, who play their home games at Beech Grove. They are currently members of the Premier Division of the Shropshire County Football League.

The town’s cricket club has teams represented in the Shropshire County Cricket league, with the first XI being in division one and the second XI being in division 6.

== Twin cities ==
Ellesmere is twinned with Diksmuide, Belgium.

== Notable people ==
In chronological order by year of birth:

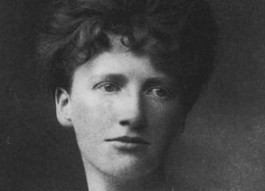
Eglantyne Jebb, 1920

- David Holbache (c.1355–1422/23), Welsh politician, best known for founding Oswestry School in 1407.
- Thomas Telford (1757–1834) lived in Ellesmere in 1790s during construction of Llangollen Canal.
- Edward King (1829-1910), later Bishop of Lincoln, was tutored in Ellesmere in 1846 / 1848 before entering Oxford University.
- Henry Southwell CMG VD (1860-1937), Church of England clergyman, later Bishop of Lewes, lived at Ellesmere as curate, 1885 / 1888.
- Eglantyne Jebb (1876 in Ellesmere – 1928) social reformer and co-founder of Save the Children
- Louisa Wilkins OBE, (née Jebb) (1873 – 1929) writer and agricultural administrator.
- Dorothy Buxton (née Jebb) (1881 in Ellesmere – 1963) humanitarian, social activist and commentator on Germany.
- Owen Paterson (born 1956), Conservative cabinet minister and MP for North Shropshire 1997–2021, lives near Ellesmere
- David Chilton Phillips KBE FRS (1924 in Ellesmere – 1999) pioneering structural biologist, became Baron Phillips of Ellesmere

=== Aristocracy ===
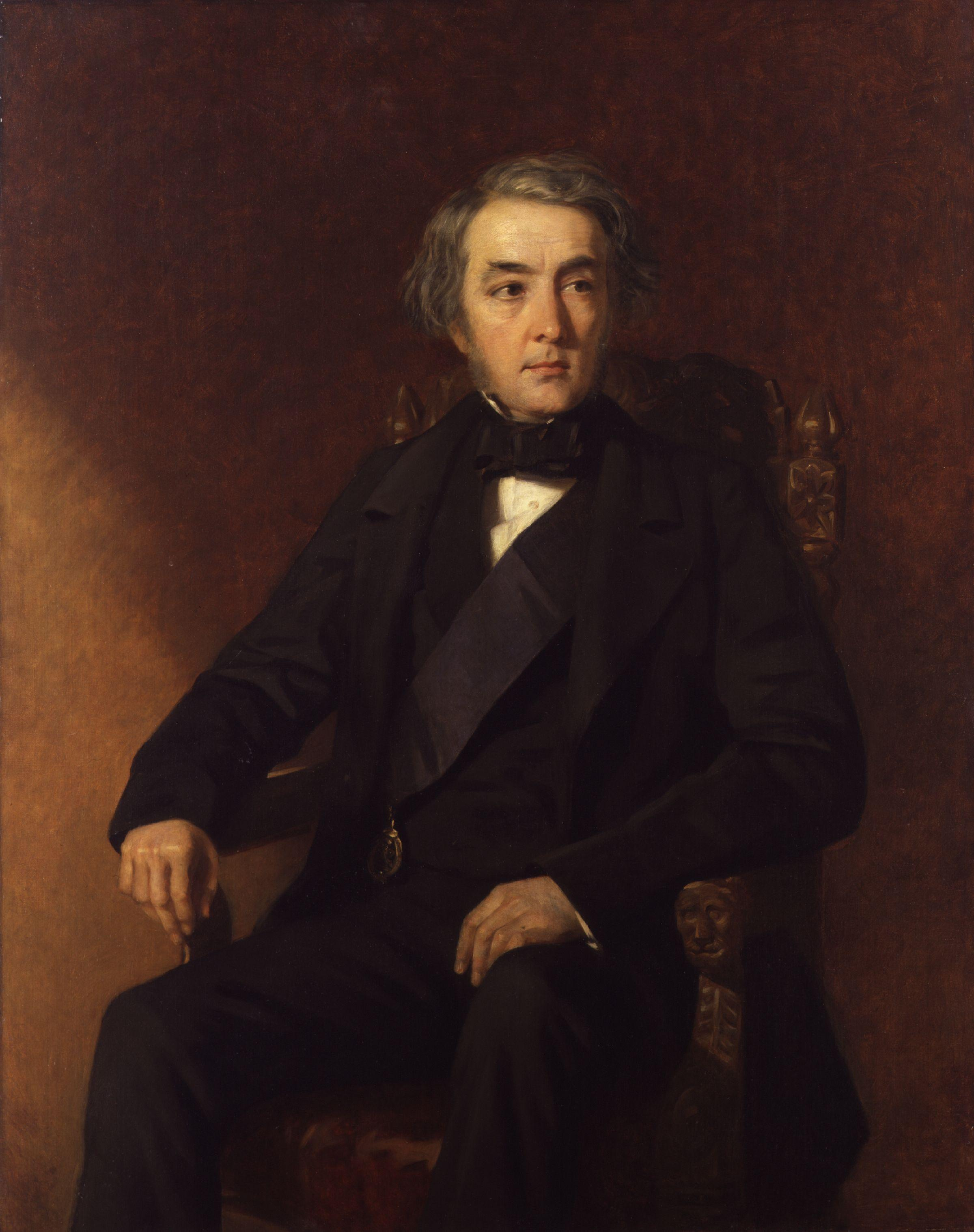
Francis Egerton, 1st Earl of Ellesmere

- Roger de Montgomerie, 1st Earl of Shrewsbury (c. 1030–1094) also known as Roger the Great, castle builder
- Dafydd ab Owain Gwynedd (ca. 1145–1203) given the manor of Ellesmere and Hales by King Henry II in 1177.
- Joan, Lady of Wales (ca. 1191–1237) illegitimate daughter of King John, was married to Llywelyn the Great and given Ellesmere as a wedding gift in 1205.
- Sir Oliver Ingham (c. 1287–1344) household knight of King Edward II, won the royal grant of the custody of Ellesmere Castle in 1321
- Sir Francis Kynaston (1587 in Oteley Park – 1642) lawyer, courtier, poet and politician
- Francis Egerton, 1st Earl of Ellesmere KG, PC (1800–1857) poet and patron of the arts
- George Egerton, 2nd Earl of Ellesmere (1823–1862) MP for North Staffordshire 1847 -1851
- Peregrine Cust, 6th Baron Brownlow (1899–1978) involved in the Edward VIII abdication crisis of 1936, gave the Boathouse, the Mere and Cremorne Gardens to the people of Ellesmere in 1953
- Francis Egerton, 7th Duke of Sutherland (born 1940) peer, became 6th Earl of Ellesmere in 2000.

=== Sport ===
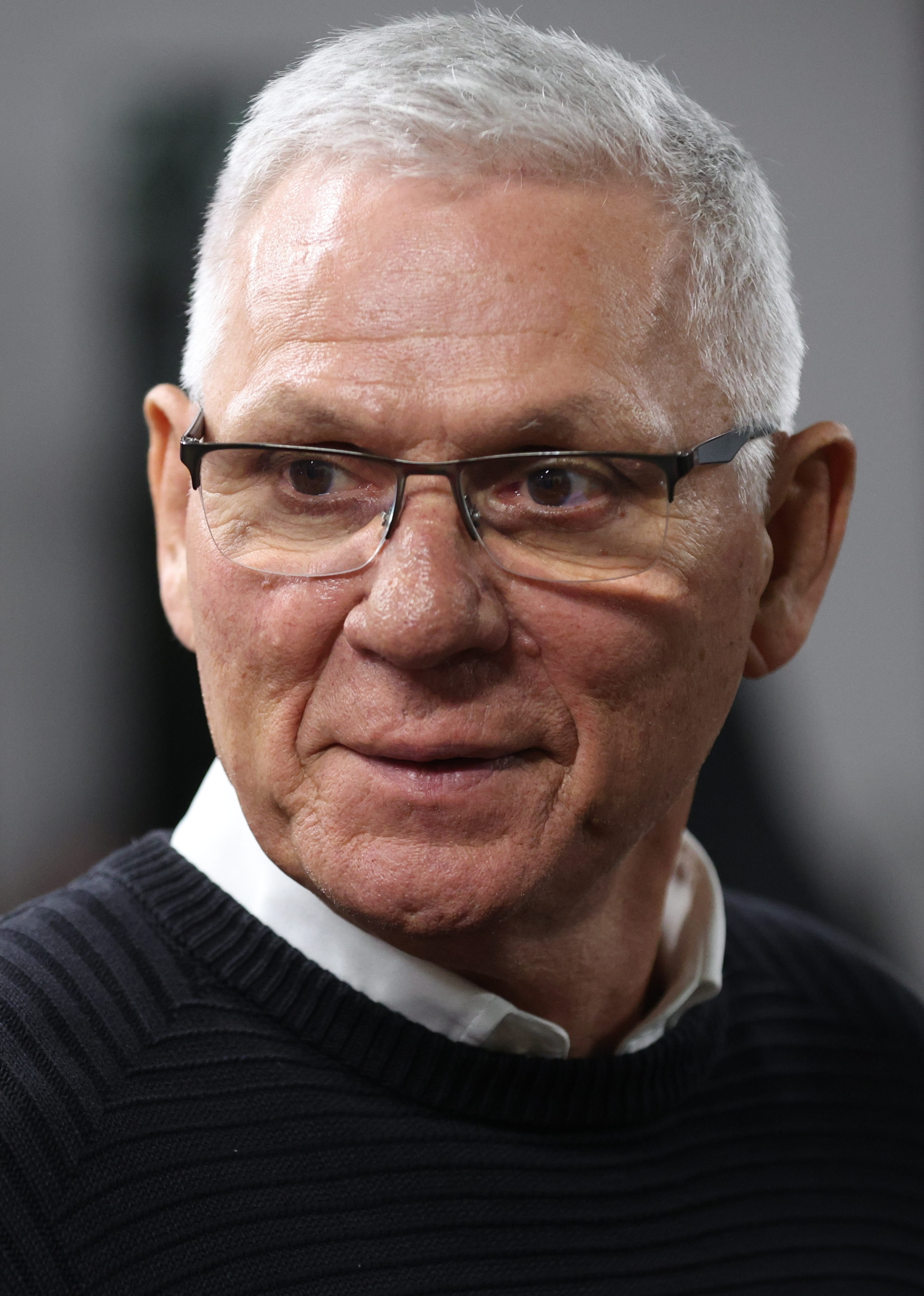
Peter Lee, 2024

- Harry Adams (1855–1910) Welsh international footballer, moved to Ellesmere 1883, then plumber in Watergate Street
- Robert Topham (1867 in Ellesmere – 1931) footballer, 2 England caps; brother of Arthur Topham
- Arthur Topham (1869 in Ellesmere – 1931) footballer, 1 England cap, played for Casuals F.C.
- Peter Lee (born 1956 in Ellesmere) ice hockey manager in Germany and retired professional ice hockey player in Canada
- Luke Preston (born 1976) Welsh Judo competitor, grew up in Criftins
- Oliver Townend MBE (born 1982), British eventing rider, gold medal winner in 2020 Summer Olympics, lives at Ellesmere

== See also ==
- Listed buildings in Ellesmere Urban
- Fenn's, Whixall and Bettisfield Mosses NNR
- Earl of Ellesmere
- Duke of Sutherland
