= Lyneal cum Colemere =

Parish in Shropshire, England

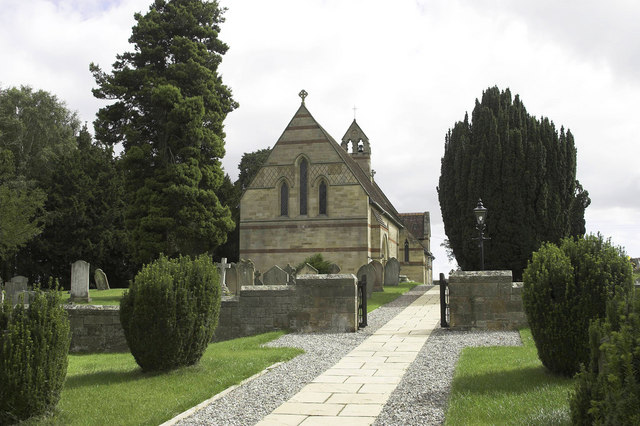
The church of St John the Evangelist, Lyneal with Colemere, photographed in 2006

Lyneal cum Colemere (or Lyneal with Colemere) is an ecclesiastical parish in Shropshire, England. It contains the villages of Lyneal and Colemere. It was formerly part of the parish of Ellesmere.

According to Edward Cassey and Company's 1871 History, Gazetteer, and Directory of Shropshire,

"LYNEAL CUM COLEMERE are two villages and townships forming a new parish recently taken out of the parish of Ellesmere. The church is a beautiful specimen of Gothic architecture on a small scale. It was built at a cost of about 2,500 by Lady Marian Alford as a memorial church to her son the late Earl Brownlow it is dedicated to St John the Evangelist and will afford sitting accommodation to 220 persons the seats are all free The living is a vicarage value 164 per annum in the gift of Earl Brownlow and held by the Rev R Lundin Brown MA. The village of COLEMERE is nearly three miles cast by south from Ellesmere. The township contains 1,440 acres of land the property of Earl Brownlow. LYNEAL is a township and village three miles south east from Ellesmere. The township contains 1,897 acres of land. Wyneal Wood is a farm in the occupation of Mr Andrew Bickley. At Lyneal there is a school for boys and girls."

The church of St John the Evangelist Church Lyneal with Colemere has a memorial to the dead of World War I, recording the names of 11 men who died from the ecclesiastical parish of Lyneal with Colemere.

The National Archives holds records relating to Lyneal cum Colemere.
