= Ellesmere Castle =

Motte and bailey castle in Shropshire

Coordinates: 52.90640°N 2.88909°W

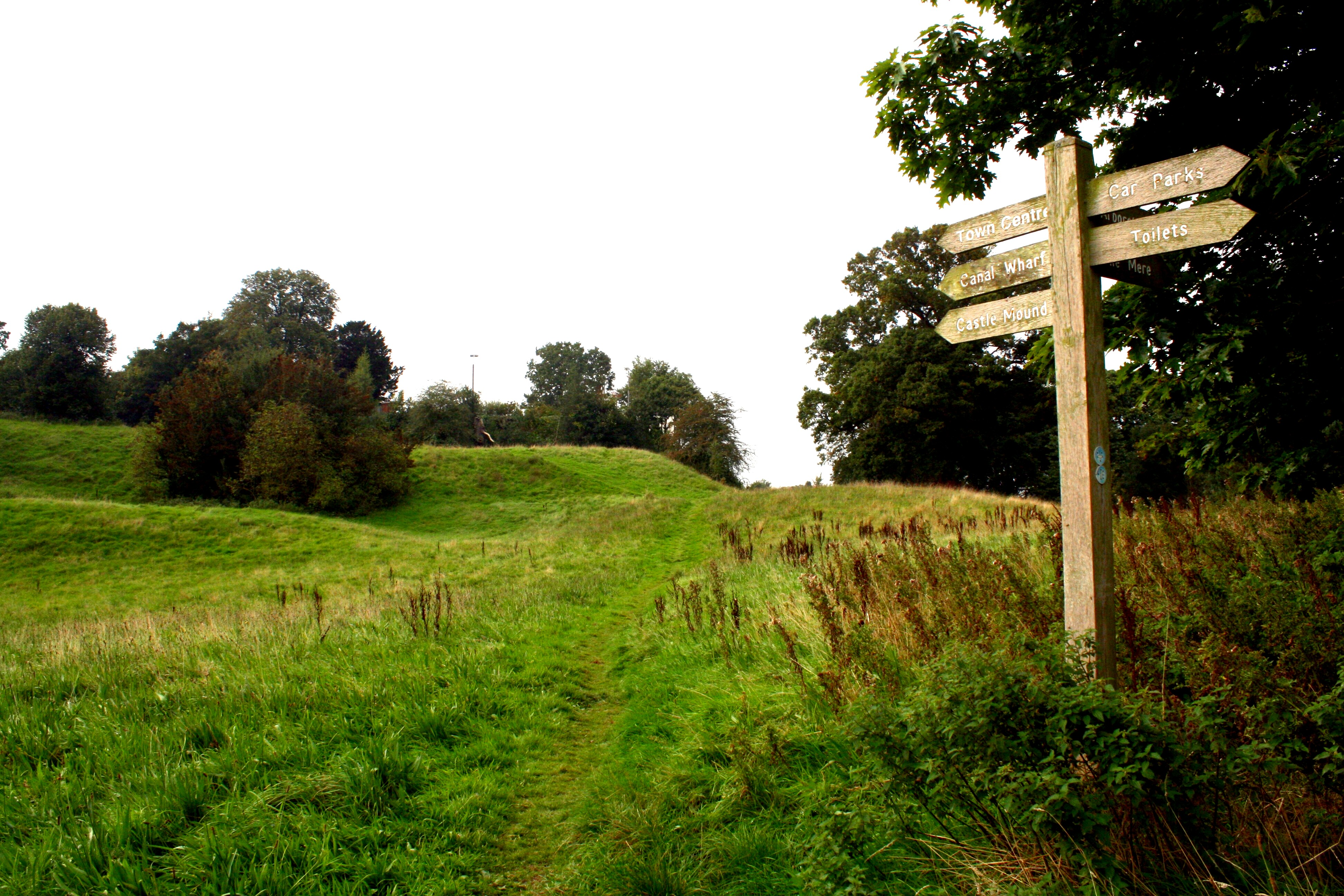
Site of Ellesmere Castle

Ellesmere Castle was in the town of Ellesmere, Shropshire. (grid reference SJ403347).

This was a motte and bailey castle which was probably founded by Roger de Montgomerie, 1st Earl of Shrewsbury on a prominent hill to the east of the town, overlooking the Mere, soon after the Norman Conquest. It was given to the Peverel family by Henry I but taken back by Henry II who granted it to Dafydd ab Owain Gwynedd, Prince of Gwynedd, in about 1177. It alternated between the English and Welsh crowns until the 1240s when it passed to the le Strange family whose origins were in Knockin, Shropshire.

The castle was destroyed in the English Civil War.

Today its summit of the motte is occupied by a bowling green, and the sides are clad with trees.

The nearest major city is Wrexham, located 17.1 km north of Ellesmere Castle. The surrounding area of Ellesmere Castle is predominantly rural.

The climate is coastal. The average temperature is 7 °C. The warmest month is July, with an average temperature of 14 °C, while the coldest month is December, with an average temperature of -2 °C.
