= Welshampton rail crash =

Fatal railway accident in Welshampton

Details
- Date: 11 June 1897
- Location: Welshampton
- Coordinates: 52.9155°N 2.8320°W
- Country: England
- Line: Oswestry, Ellesmere and Whitchurch Railway
- Cause: Excessive speed/track condition

Statistics
- Trains: 1
- Deaths: 12

The Welshampton rail crash was a fatal railway accident in the Welsh borders village of Welshampton on 11 June 1897. It resulted in the deaths of 12 people.

An excursion to Barmouth had been organised by the United Sunday Schools of Royton. A group of 320 passengers were on board a train of mixed Cambrian Railways (CR) and Lancashire & Yorkshire Railway (L&YR) stock of 15 carriages, pulled by two locomotives. Earlier in the day a CR guard had complained of the rough-riding of a small 4-wheeled L&YR brake van, which on the return journey was at the front of the train.

The train left Barmouth at 18:00. At about 22:20 one of the engines and 13 of the coaches left the rails of the CR's Oswestry, Ellesmere and Whitchurch Railway, 154 yards (141 m) east of Welshampton station. Nine passengers were killed in what was the first fatal accident on the line since it was built. Two other passengers and a railway employee died later from injuries.

Although the initial investigation centred on the first carriage to leave the rails, an L&YR third-class brake coach, the enquiry concluded that the speed of the train was too high considering the state of the track which had many sleepers in need of replacement; also that the rail was too light for high speed running. The CR disputed the findings and maintained that the L&YR vehicle was to blame.

A memorial on the front of the Town Hall in Royton, Greater Manchester, names those killed in the accident. A second memorial, installed by local people, at the side of the A495 Ellesmere to Whitchurch road, near to the site of the accident, shows the Cambrian Railways coat of arms. The railway line between Oswestry, Ellesmere and Whitchurch is now disused and, although some of the line is visible, the site of the accident itself has been ploughed out. The Welshampton Station building still exists and has been converted into a house. This second memorial stone is located just in front of its fence by the roadside.

== Cited works and further reading ==
- Faith, Nicholas (1998). Derail: Why Trains Crash. Channel 4 Books. ISBN 0-752-21987-1.
- Foley, Michael (2014). Britain's Railway Disasters: Fatal Accidents from the 1830s to the Present. Pen & Sword Books Ltd. ISBN 978-1-781-59379-0.
- Johnson, Peter (2013). The Cambrian Railways: A New History. Oxford Publishing Company. ISBN 978-0-860-93644-2.
