= Emerson Smith =

Canadian flying ace

- Born: Emerson Arthur Lincoln Smith; 7 September 1896; York, Ontario, Canada
- Military career
- Allegiance: Canada; United Kingdom
- Branch: Royal Flying Corps; Royal Air Force
- Service years: 1916-
- Rank: 2nd Lieutenant
- Unit: No. 45 Squadron RFC/RAF

2nd Lieutenant Emerson Smith was a Canadian flying ace during the First World War. World War I. He was credited with seven aerial victories, six while flying a Sopwith Camel. He was shot down and wounded in October 1917 and captured.

== Early life ==
Smith was born in York, Ontario on 7 September 1896.

== First World War ==
In April 1916 Smith enlisted in the East Kootenay Regiment, transferring to Royal Flying Corps on 5 February 1917. After completing flying training in Canada was commissioned on 16 June 1917 and posted on 12 August 1917 to "A" Flight of 45 Squadron RFC on the Western Front.

Only nine days after joining the squadron Smith helped to destroy a German Albatros scout aircraft, both he and his observer fired at the Albatros and it broke up in the air and crashed. Now flying the Sopwith Camel, the flight were on patrol and engaged 15 Albatros scout aircraft, Smith shot down two. The next day Smith was on an offensive patrol with the flight and they engaged with two DFW and five Albatros aircraft, Smith fired over a hundred rounds into one of Scouts sending it crashing out of control. On 20 September 2nd Lieutenant Moody and Brownell each dived on a German Albatros and fired at it until it dived away, Smith followed the aircraft down firing at it until it went down in flames, they shared the victory. Smith's next victory was on 22 September 1917 over Comines, after the patrol engaged 20 Albatros scouts Smith shot one down out of control. His last victory was on 1 October 1917 when he shot down another Albatross out of control.

On 26 October 1917 he was shot down by Joachim von Busse of Jasta 3, he was wounded and crashed, being captured by the Germans.

== List of aerial victories ==
See also Aerial victory standards of World War I

No.	Date/time	Aircraft	Foe	Result	Location	Notes
1	21 August 1917 @ 1000	Sopwith 1½ Strutter	Albatros D.III	Destroyed	South East of Ypres	Observer/gunner: H Grenner
2	9 September 1917 @ 1630	Sopwith Camel	Albatros C	Destroyed	Comines	
3	9 September 1917 @ 1635	Sopwith Camel	Albatros C	Driven down out of control	Three miles east of Ypres	
4	10 September 1917 @ 1730	Sopwith Camel	Albatros D.III	Driven down out of control	Houthoulst Forest	
5	20 September 1917 @ 1825	Sopwith Camel	German aircraft	Destroyed in flames	Passchendaele	Shared with Lts Henry Moody and Raymond Brownell
6	21 September 1917 @ 1840	Sopwith Camel	Albatros D.V	Driven down out of control	Passchendaele	
7	1 October 1917 @ 1220	Sopwith Camel	Albatros D.V	Driven down out of control	Quesnoy	
