= Welshampton =

Village in Shropshire, England

Coordinates: 52.909°N 2.842°W

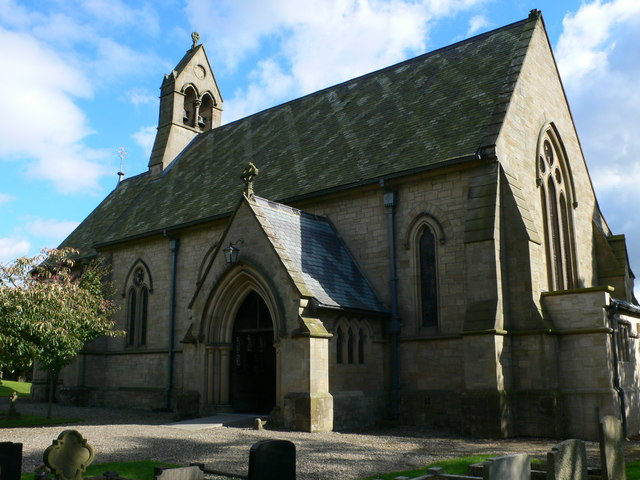
- Church of St Michael and All Angels, Welshampton

- Location within Shropshire
- Population: 852 (2011 Census)
- OS grid reference: SJ433349
- Civil parish: Welshampton and Lyneal
- Unitary authority: Shropshire
- Ceremonial county: Shropshire
- Region: West Midlands
- Country: England
- Sovereign state: United Kingdom
- Post town: ELLESMERE
- Postcode district: SY12
- Dialling code: 01948
- Police: West Mercia
- Fire: Shropshire
- Ambulance: West Midlands
- UK Parliament: North Shropshire

Welshampton is a small village and former civil parish, now in the parish of Welshampton and Lyneal, in the Shropshire district, in the ceremonial county of Shropshire, England. It is located on the A495 road, near to the town of Ellesmere. It is adjacent to the villages of Lyneal and Colemere which comprise part of the so-called 'North Shropshire Lake District', all of which is within walking distance of Welshampton. At the 2001 Census, the Welshampton and Lyneal civil parish had a population of 839, increasing to 852 at the 2011 Census. with a total population of 3,896 (2001) for the Ellesmere and Welshampton ward.

== History ==
According to a small history booklet written by local historian Christopher Jobson, published April 2007 entitled "What was on in Welshampton", "a small mound in the field called 'Moat Meadow' was tentatively identified as the site of the house of a Saxon ealdorman or King's Thane by the Rev. Thomas Auden towards the end of the nineteenth century." According to an article by the same author, in the August 2008 edition of "Mere News", the original village was known as 'Hampton' and had been in the barony of le Strange from Knockin since the 14th century. It came into the estates of the Earls of Derby through the marriage of Elizabeth Stanley (the daughter of Sir Thomas Stanley and Joan Gousell) and Thomas Strange in the early 15th century. The Stanley family is reputedly descended from Adam de Aldithley and the origin of the names may therefore be no mere coincidence.

The original site of Hampton was a high and flat hill overlooking a lowland area known as Bradenheath. The oldest known reference with the 'Welsh' prefix is 1587 which mentions two members of local families, the Kynastons and Hanmers.

An African prince, Jeremiah Libopuoa Moshueshue, who died in Welshampton in 1863, is buried at St Michael and All Angels' Church. The church is reputedly designed by George Gilbert Scott.

On 11 June 1897 there was a serious railway accident at Welshampton in which 11 people were killed following a derailment. The line was closed in 1965.

In 1931 the parish of Welshampton had a population of 388. On 1 April 1988 the parish was abolished to form "Lyneal & Welshampton".

== War Memorial and War Grave ==
The village war memorial, within the churchyard, was erected in 1920 and paid for, mainly, by the Reverend Henry Moody, vicar of the parish for 45 years. His son, Charles Angelo Moody was killed whilst flying over Belgium in 1917 and the memorial was erected in his memory and that of 16 villagers who perished serving in World War I. Moody lost his other twin son Henry in a flying accident in 1931, and a record of it is engraved on the front of the memorial. The Reverend Henry Moody died in 1932. The names of three men who died during World War II and one during the Korean War are also engraved on the memorial.

In 2010, the war memorial underwent a complete restoration and cleaning, following a campaign to raise funds, spearheaded by Neville Metcalfe, a former resident of the village. His uncle, Francis John Bailey, whose name is engraved on the memorial, served with the 10th. Battalion King's Shropshire Light Infantry, but died on 5 May 1918. A grant from the Ellesmere Local Joint Committee of £500 helped Mr. Metcalfe achieve his aim.

The churchyard contains one registered war grave, of a woman of Queen Mary's Army Auxiliary Corps who died in 1920.

== Education ==
In 2006, Welshampton Church of England Primary School received the highest Ofsted awards in every single category for a primary school in the UK, describing it as "outstanding".

== Notable people ==
- Walter Nugent Monck, theatre director, was born here.
- Jeremiah Libopuoa Moshueshue, an African prince, died here
- Lieutenant Colonel John Lloyd Dickin formerly of Loppington who built Lyneal Lodge

== Festival of Fire ==
This event has been staged each year since 2002 where the people of Welshampton design and build a "themed" bonfire. The event is usually held before 5 November, the traditional Guy Fawkes Night or "Bonfire night", as it is not associated with the traditional festival.

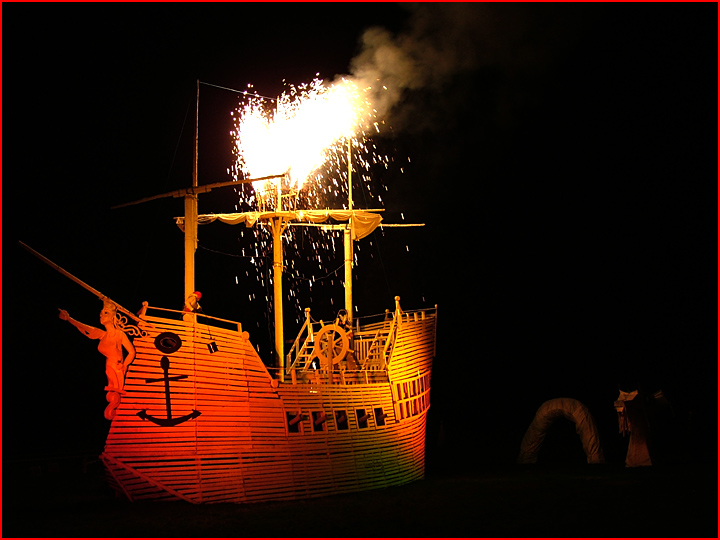
2005 - The Welshampton Tribute to Trafalgar

2006 - The Welshampton Train

== Welshampton Plant Fair ==
The first Fair took place in 2006, to raise funds for the replacement of the roof of the beautiful listed St Michael and All Angels Church, in Welshampton. Since then, the Fair has become an annual event, held every Spring Bank Holiday Monday, and growing by the year.

By 2008, when the church roof was funded, it continued to support the church’s upkeep and also Shropshire Macmillan Cancer Support, which was then fund-raising for their new cancer support area at the Robert Jones and Agnes Hunt Orthopaedic Hospital, Oswestry.

All proceeds have continued to be donated to these popular charities, totalling in all over £40,000 over the past 10 years, including over £10,000 in 2015. In addition to raising funds, the Fair also promotes Macmillan’s wonderful work in the County – their Shropshire fund-raising manager having an information stall on the day. The Auction of special plants continued to grow and grow since its introduction and was hoped to be the main event next year in 2016.

Now the fair hopes to go digital....www.welshamptonplantfair.co.uk www.welshamptonplantfair.co.uk

== See also ==
- List of rail accidents in the United Kingdom
- Listed buildings in Welshampton and Lyneal
