= John Holt =

John Holt may refer to:

== Politics ==
- John Holt (publisher) (1721–1784), publisher and mayor of Williamsburg, Virginia
- John Langford-Holt (1916–1993), British member of parliament
- John Holt (Australian politician) (1929–2012), New South Wales politician

== Sports ==
- John Holt (American football) (1959–2013), American football cornerback
- John Holt (Australian footballer) (born 1962), for North Melbourne
- John Holt (basketball), American basketball player
- John Holt (cricketer) (1923–1997), West Indian cricketer
- John Holt (footballer, born 1956), Scottish footballer for Dundee United
- John Holt (swimmer) (1922–1966), British swimmer
- Johnny Holt (1865–1937), English footballer for Everton

== Other ==
- John Holt (15th-century judge) (died 1418), English judge
- John Holt (English educator) (died 1504), educator of Henry VIII
- John Holt (academic) (died 1631), Oxford college head
- John Holt (Lord Chief Justice) (1642–1710), Lord Chief Justice of England and Wales
- John Holt (composer) (1726–1753), London bell ringer
- John Holt (priest) (died 1734), Anglican priest
- John Holt (author) (1743–1801), English author
- John Holt (businessman) (1841–1915), English shipping merchant
- John Dominis Holt II (1861–1915), Hawaiian colonel and Democratic delegate
- John Dominis Holt IV (1919–1993), Hawaiian writer and cultural historian
- John F. Holt (1915–1996), American medical doctor
- John Riley Holt (1918–2009), English experimental physicist
- John Holt (American educator) (1923–1985), American homeschooling pioneer
- John Holt (singer) (1947–2014), Jamaican reggae singer
- John Holt (veterinarian) (1931–2013), Australian veterinarian and Olympic shooter
- John Holt & Co (Liverpool), a United Kingdom company
- John Holt plc, Nigerian conglomerate

== See also ==
- Jack Holt (disambiguation)
