= Paul Thomas =

Paul Thomas may refer to:

== Sports ==
- Paul Thomas (basketball) (born 1962), American basketball coach
- Paul Thomas (bishop), British Anglican Bishop of Oswestry
- Paul Thomas (born 1980), American bassist best known as a member of Good Charlotte
- Paul Thomas (cricketer) (born 1971), English cricketer
- Paul Thomas (figure skater), British figure skater
- Paul Thomas (footballer) (born 1982), Australian rules footballer

== Other ==
- Paul Thomas (director) (1949–2025), American pornographic actor and director
- Paul Thomas (Marx scholar) (1943–2016), author of several books on Karl Marx
- Paul Thomas (writer) (born 1951), New Zealand writer
- Paul Richard Thomas (born 1977), French photographer
- Paul Thomas (priest) (born 1955), British Anglican priest
- Paul Thomas (politician), member of the North Dakota House of Representatives
- Paul Thomas (university administrator) (born 1941), Australian university vice-chancellor
- Paul F. Thomas (born 1963), United States Coast Guard admiral

== See also ==
- Thomas Paul (disambiguation)
