= Halston Hall Chapel =

- Halston Hall Chapel
- 52°52′30″N 2°59′01″W
- OS grid reference: SJ 33883 31297
- Location: Whittington, Shropshire
- Country: England

Architecture
- Completed: 15th century

Halston Hall Chapel is an ancient church building in Whittington, Shropshire, within the grounds of Halston Hall. Both are Grade I listed buildings. Dating to the second half of the 15th century, the chapel is one of only two timber-framed churches in Shropshire.

The chapel's cemetery includes several members of the Mytton family. The eccentric John "Mad Jack" Mytton (1796–1834) is buried in a vault within the chapel.

== See also ==
- Grade I listed churches in Shropshire
- Listed buildings in Whittington, Shropshire
