= Bob Jeffery =

British Anglican priest (1935–2016)

Robert Martin Colquhoun Jeffery AKC FRSA, commonly known as Bob Jeffery (30 April 1935 – 21 December 2016), was an Anglican priest.

Jeffery was educated at St Paul's School, London, trained for the priesthood at King's College London and ordained in 1960. His first posts were curacies at St Aidan's, Grangetown and St Mary's Church, Barnes. After this he was the assistant secretary of the Missionary and Ecumenical Council of the Church Assembly then secretary of the Department of Mission and Unity for the British Council of Churches. From 1971 to 1978 he was vicar of St Andrew's Headington and Rural Dean of Cowley, then in 1978 he was appointed Lichfield diocesan missioner, where he was also Priest-in-Charge of St Bartholomew's, Tong. He was appointed as the Archdeacon of Salop, in 1980 and seven years later became the Dean of Worcester. In 1996 he became Sub-Dean of Christ Church, a post he held until his retirement in 2002. In 1999, he was awarded an Honorary Doctorate of Divinity by the University of Birmingham, and in 2007 he was made an Honorary Fellow of Ripon College, Cuddesdon.

He married Ruth Tinling in 1968 and had four children, Graham (b. 1969), Hilary (b. 1971), Philippa (b. 1973) and Charles (b.1975).

He died on 21 December 2016 at the age of 81. Following a funeral service at Christ Church, Oxford on 16 January 2017, he was buried in the churchyard of St Bartholomew's, Tong, Shropshire on 17 January 2017. A collection of his writings compiled by his children, entitled The Kingdom of God is like a Yoghurt Plant, was published in June 2017.

== Publications ==
=== Author ===
- 1968: Areas of Ecumenical Experiment: a survey and report to the British Council of Churches (London: British Council of Churches)
- 1971: Ecumenical Experiments: a handbook (London: British Council of Churches. ISBN 0-851-69010-6)
- 1972: Case Studies in Unity (London: SCM. ISBN 0-334-00161-7)
- 1994: Anima Christi: Reflections on Praying with Christ (London: Darton, Longman & Todd. ISBN 0-232-52056-9)
- 2007: Discovering Tong: Its History, Myths and Curiosities (Tong: Tong Parochial Church Council. ISBN 978-0-9555089-0-5)
- 2017: The Kingdom of God is like a Yoghurt Plant: Selected Writings by Bob Jeffery (Paisley: Jeffery Archive. ISBN 978-1-9997514-0-1)

=== Translator ===
- 2013: Thomas à Kempis, The Imitation of Christ (London: Penguin Classics. ISBN 978-0-1411917-6-8)

Church of England titles
Preceded by Sidney Denham Austerberry	Archdeacon of Salop; 1980–1987	Succeeded by Peter Marshall
Preceded by Tom Baker	Dean of Worcester; 1987–1996	Succeeded by George Frost
