= John Mytton =

British eccentric and politician

John Mytton Mad Jack
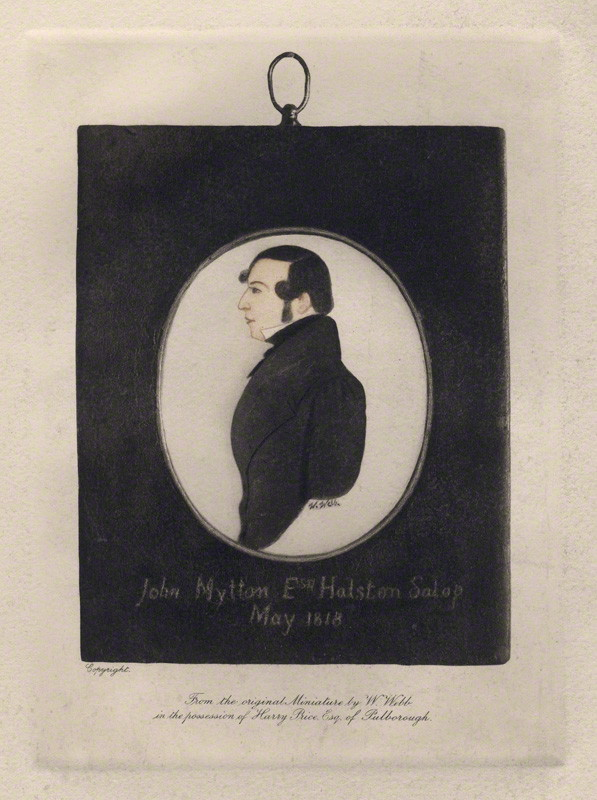
- John Mytton c. May 1818
- Born: 30 September 1796; Halston Hall, Whittington, Shropshire
- Died: 29 March 1834 (aged 37); King's Bench Prison, Southwark
- Occupations: Squire, rake
- Known for: flamboyant eccentric behaviour
- Political party: Tory
- Spouse(s): Harriet Emma Jones (1818–1820); Caroline Mallet Giffard (1821)

Member of Parliament for Shrewsbury
- In office 1819–1820
- Preceded by: Richard Lyster
- Succeeded by: Panton Corbett

John "Mad Jack" Mytton (30 September 1796 – 29 March 1834) was a British eccentric and rake of the Regency period who was briefly a Tory Member of Parliament.

== Early life ==
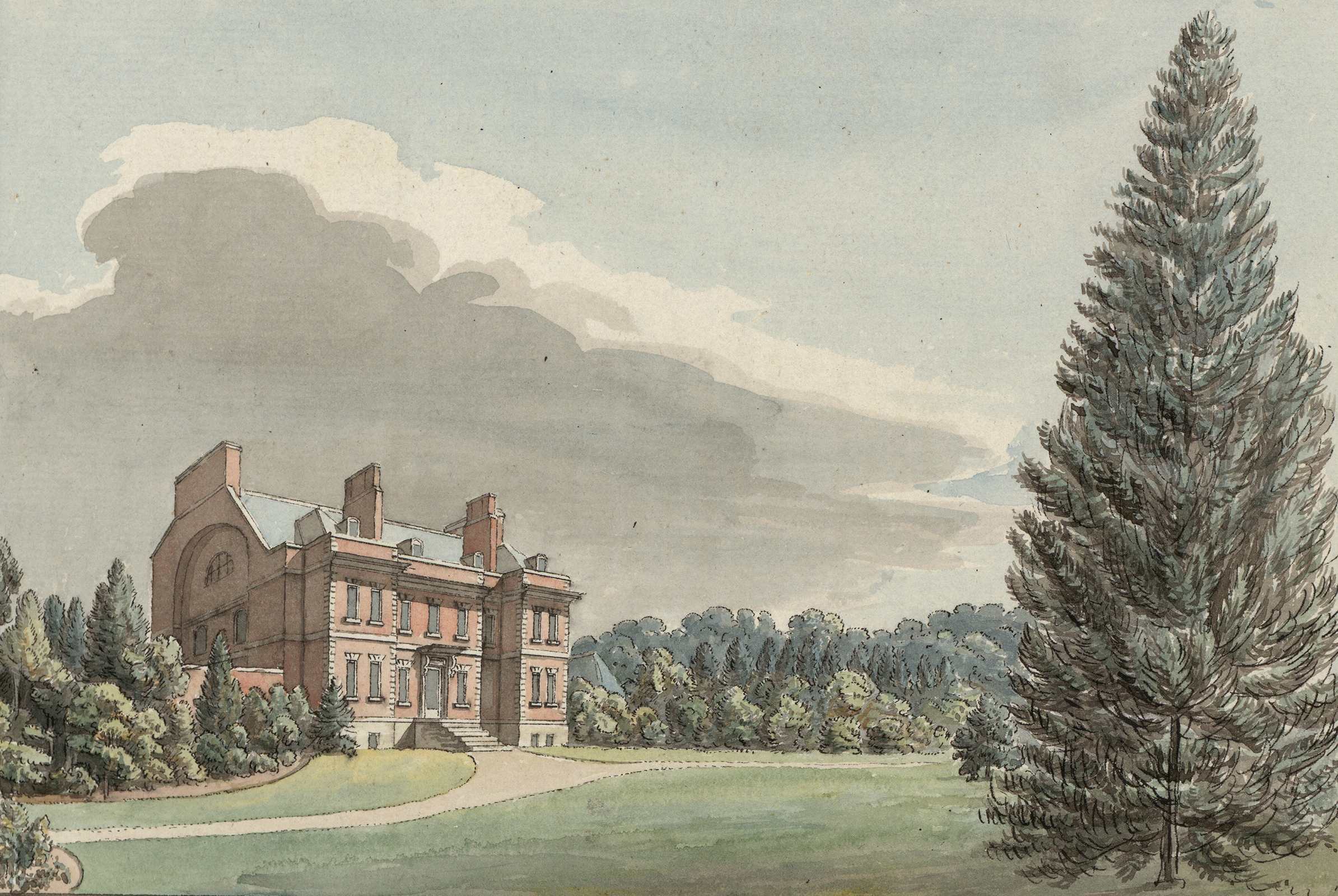
Halston Hall, Whittington

John Mytton was born on 30 September 1796, the son of John Mytton and Sarah Harriet. His family were Shropshire squires with a lineage that stretched back some 500 years. (Note: The Mytton surname may have originated as Mutton or be associated with the village of Mytton, near Forton Heath, a few miles west of Shrewsbury.) His father died at the age of 30, when Jack was two years old, and he inherited the family seat of Halston Hall, Whittington, near Oswestry, which was worth £60,000 (equivalent to £6,700,000 in 2025), as well as an annual income of £10,000 (equivalent to £1,100,000 in 2025) from rental and agricultural assets generated by estates of more than 132,000 acres (53,000 ha) at Dinas Mawddwy and in Shropshire.

Mytton was sent to Westminster School, but was expelled after one year for fighting a master. He was then sent to Harrow School, from which he was also expelled after three terms. He was then educated by a disparate series of private tutors whom he tormented with practical jokes that included leaving a horse in one tutor's bedroom.

Despite having achieved very little academically, Mytton was granted entry to Trinity College, Cambridge. He matriculated in January 1816 but, according to Alumni Cantabrigienses, it is doubtful that he took up his place, although there are claims that he took 2,000 bottles of port to sustain himself during his studies. He certainly was not awarded a degree, having found university life boring, and embarked on a Grand Tour.

== Military service ==
Mytton saw both part-time and full-time military service. In 1812, when he was 16, he was commissioned as captain in a local yeomanry regiment, the Oswestry Rangers. In 1814 it was merged into the North Shropshire Yeomanry Cavalry, into which Mytton transferred.

After Mytton's return from the Grand Tour, he was commissioned in the regular Army and joined the 7th Hussars. As a cornet, he spent a year with the regiment in France as part of the army of occupation after the defeat of Napoleon I, spending his time gambling and drinking before resigning his commission. He rejoined the North Shropshire Yeomanry after his subsequent return to England and was promoted to major in 1822. He had attempted in vain to lobby its colonel for an even higher rank in the place of an uncle, William Owen, who had left the regiment. Despite his later periods abroad and imprisonment, he was still on the regimental strength at the time of his death twelve years later.

== Life as a squire ==
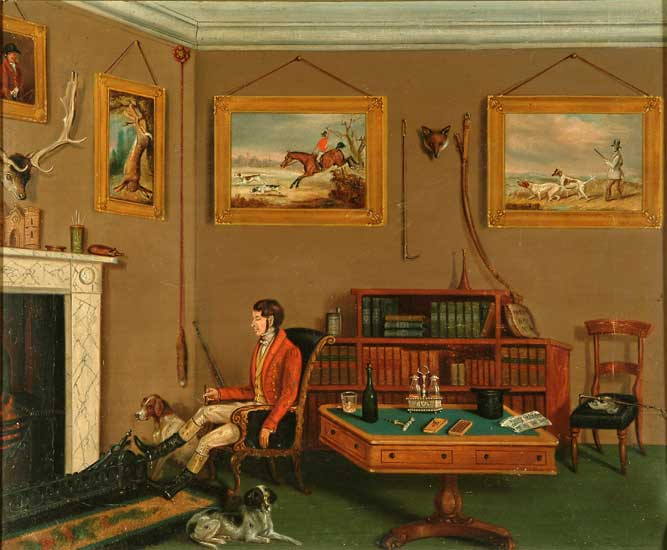
John Mytton, c. 1820 – 1830

Mytton later returned to his country seat and took up the duties of a squire in preparation for coming into his full inheritance when he became 21.

In 1819 he entertained ambitions of standing for Parliament, as a Tory, following family tradition. He secured his seat by offering voters £10 notes, spending a total of £10,000 (equivalent to £757,894 in 2025). He thus became MP for Shrewsbury. He spent just 30 minutes in the House of Commons in June 1819, but found the debates boring and difficult to follow because of his incipient deafness. When Parliament was dissolved in 1820 he declined to stand at the next election.

However, he attempted to re-enter Parliament in 1831, this time for one of the two Shropshire seats and as a Whig candidate. He withdrew on the fifth day of the poll and came bottom with 376 votes. He then issued an address stating that he would contest the next parliamentary election, but by the time of that election, in 1832, he had gone into exile to escape his creditors.

He instead served as High Sheriff of Merionethshire for 1821–22, High Sheriff of Shropshire for 1823–24; Mayor of Oswestry for 1824–25 and as treasurer of the Salop Infirmary at Shrewsbury in 1822.

Meanwhile, he indulged his enjoyment of horseracing and gambling, and enjoyed some success at both. He bought a horse named Euphrates, which was already a consistent winner, and entered it in the Gold Cup at Lichfield in 1825, and it duly won. Its portrait, commissioned by Mytton from the painter William Webb, was exhibited at the Royal Academy the same year. Mytton also became a well-known character at Oswestry Race Course, an increasingly disreputable local racetrack.

It is said that in 1826, in order to win a bet, he rode a horse into the Bedford Hotel opposite the Town Hall in Leamington Spa, up the grand staircase and onto the balcony, from which he jumped, still seated on his horse, over the diners in the restaurant below, and out through the window onto the Parade.

He also held contests for local children at Dinas Mawddwy, giving sums ranging from half a crown to half a guinea to those who rolled all the way down the hill Moel Dinas.

=== Field sports ===
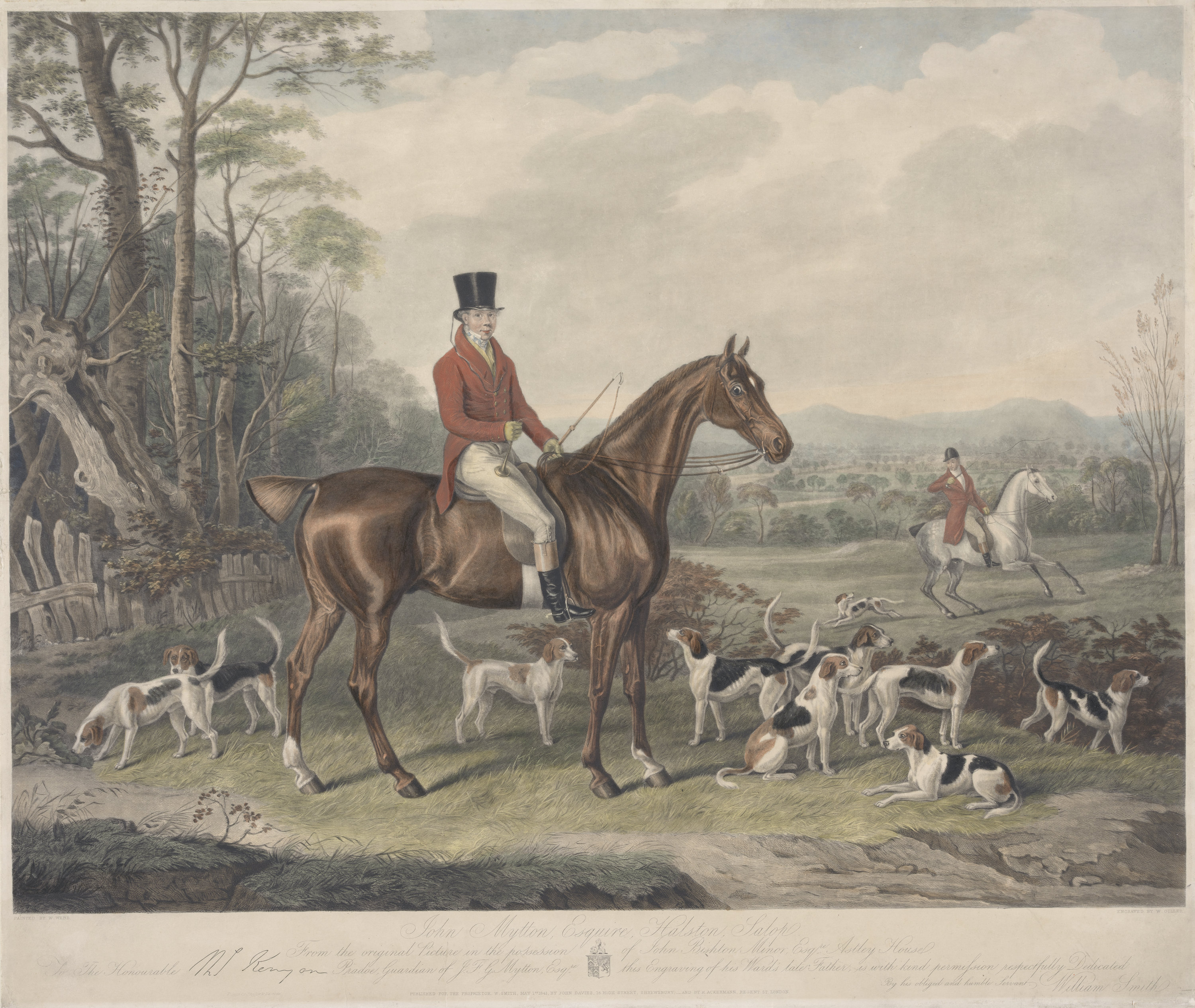
John Mytton, Esquire, Halston, Salop, by William Giller after William Webb, 1841

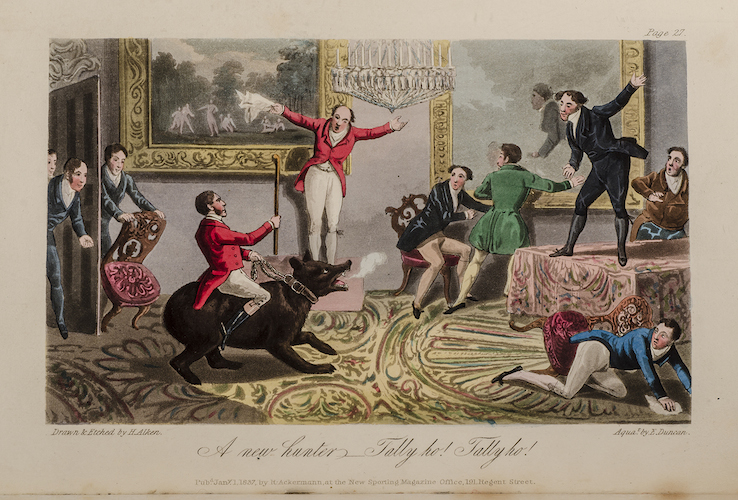
Mytton riding his bear, by Henry Alken, 1837

Mytton had hunted foxes with his own pack of hounds from the age of ten and went hunting in any kind of weather. His usual winter gear was a light jacket, thin shoes, linen trousers and silk stockings, but in the thrill of the chase he sometimes stripped off and continued the hunt naked, even through snow drifts and rivers in full spate. He also continued hunting despite being unseated and sustaining broken ribs -"unmurmuring when every jar was an agony", and sometimes led his stable boys on rat hunts, each stable boy being equipped with ice skates. He had a wardrobe consisting of 150 pairs of hunting breeches, 700 pairs of handmade hunting boots, 1,000 hats and some 3,000 shirts.

Mytton kept numerous pets, including some 2,000 dogs. His favourites among them were fed on steak and champagne. His favourite horse, Baronet, had free range inside Halston Hall and lay in front of the fire with Mytton.

It was said of "Mad Jack" that "not only did he not mind accidents, he positively liked them". Mytton drove his gig at high speed and once decided to discover if a horse pulling a carriage could jump over a tollgate (it could not). On another occasion he asked his passenger whether he had ever been upset in a gig. The man said he had not and Mytton responded, "What!! What a damn slow fellow you must have been all your life!" He promptly drove the gig up a sloping bank at full speed, tipping himself and his passenger out.

== Decline and death ==
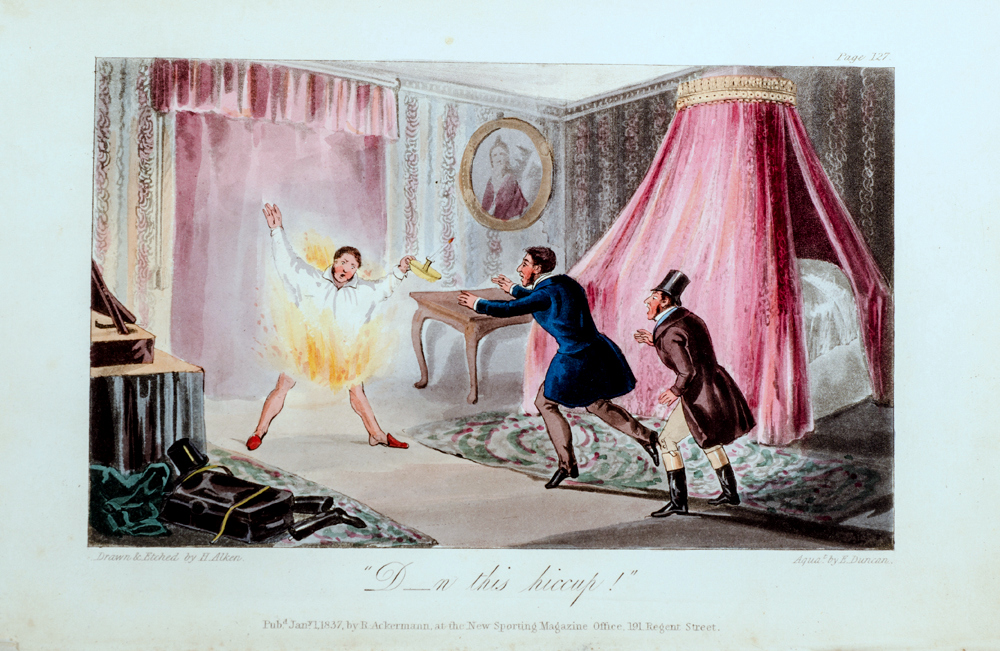
D--n this hiccup, by Henry Alken, 1837

Mytton was an extravagant spendthrift. Visitors to his estates sometimes found banknotes secreted around the grounds, whether left on purpose or simply lost. Over the course of fifteen years he managed to spend his inheritance and then fell into deep debt. His agent had calculated that if he could but reduce his expenditure to £6,000 a year for six years his estate would not have to be sold, but Mytton declared that "I wouldn't give a damn to live on £6,000 a year!" In 1831 he sold his estate at Dinas Mawddwy to John Bird, and fled to Calais to avoid his creditors. He had met an attractive 20-year-old woman named Susan on Westminster Bridge and offered her £500 a year to be his companion. She accompanied him to France and stayed with him until his death.

During his stay in Calais he tried to cure his hiccups by setting his shirt on fire. Charles James Apperley, who wrote under the pseudonym of "Nimrod", was present at this event: "'Damn this hiccup!!' said Mytton as he stood undressed on the floor, apparently in the act of getting into bed 'but I’ll frighten it away'; so seizing a lighted candle applied it to the tail of his shirt – it being a cotton one – he was instantly enveloped in flames. A fellow guest and Mytton’s servant beat out the flames: 'The hiccup is gone, by God!', said he and reeled, naked, into bed."

In 1833, Mytton returned to England, where, still unable to pay his debts, he was confined at Shrewsbury Prison, then transferred to the King's Bench Prison in Southwark. He died there in 1834, a "round-shouldered, tottering, old-young man bloated by drink, worn out by too much foolishness, too much wretchedness and too much brandy". The cause of death was delirium tremens. He was buried in the vault of the private chapel at Halston on 9 April. In 2023, a Time Team investigation sent a camera down into the vault, which discovered his intact coffin had what appeared to be the skin of his beloved pet bear draped over it.

A print of a portrait of John Mytton by Rudolph Ackermann was published in 1847, 13 years after their deaths. These were marked "JOHN MYTTON ESQ. HALSTON SALOP ~ from an original picture in the possession of John Bishton Minor Esq. Astley House Pradoe, guardian of J. F. G. Mytton, this engraving of his ward's late father" When the print was published John jnr would have been 24 years old and would have inherited what was left of the estate. There is also a portrait of Mytton on horseback, by William Webb, and numerous illustrations, by Henry Thomas Alken and T. J. Rawlins, appear in Nimrod's Life of John Mytton.

== Personal life ==
In 1818, Mytton married Harriet Emma Jones, a daughter of Sir Thomas Tyrwhitt Jones, in London. Before her death in Cliffden, Somerset, on 2 July 1820, they were the parents of:

- Harriet Emma Charlotte Mytton (1819–1885), who married Clement Delves Hill, a nephew of Maj-Gen. Clement Delves Hill.

His second marriage was to Caroline Mallet Giffard from Chillington Hall in October 1821 at Brewood, Staffordshire. She ran away in 1830 and lived the rest of his life estranged. Before their estrangement, they were the parents of a daughter and four sons:

- Barbara Augusta Norah Mytton (1822–1870), who married Col. Poulett George Henry Somerset, son of Lord Charles Henry Somerset, a younger brother of the 6th Duke of Beaufort, in 1847.
- John Fox Fitz-Giffard Mytton (1823–1875), who married Jane Latham.
- Charles Orville January Mytton (1825–1834), who died young.
- Euphrates Henry Mytton (1826–1834), who died young.
- William Harper Mytton (b. 1827).

Euphrates and Charles both died within months after their father and were also buried at Halston, as was Caroline upon her death in 1841. His two other sons and both daughters survived him.

== Legacy ==
- Mytton appears prominently in Dame Edith Sitwell's 1933 book English Eccentrics, which draws largely on the Nimrod account.
- The Jack Mytton Way, a long-distance bridleway for riders, mountain bikers and walkers, runs for 116 km (72 mi) through South and Mid-Shropshire
- There is a public house named after Mytton in the canalside village of Hindford near Halston Hall
- A hotel, the Mytton and Mermaid Hotel, on the River Severn at Atcham, near Shrewsbury, and has a bar called Mad Jack's Bar. His funeral cortege halted there on its way to the chapel at Halston
- The Jack Mytton Run, an annual event by students, was held on the University of Minnesota campus in Minneapolis, Minnesota across Northrup Mall on the first class day following spring break. It is reported to have begun in 1999. The event was discontinued in 2009 when campus police deterred it
- He is mentioned in the book The French Lieutenant's Woman by John Fowles, beside Casanova
- Jack Wenlock, the lead character in The Case of the 'Hail Mary' Celeste by Malcolm Pryce is revealed as being named after John Mytton.
- There is a race horse named after him
- He is the earliest known person to use the phrase "easy come, easy go" in an earlier form as "light come, light go".

== See also ==
- Thomas Mytton
- Garth (Guilsfield)

== Other sources ==
- Nimrod (1837) [1835]. Memoirs of The Life of The Late John Mytton, Esq. Rudolph Ackermann.
- Harriet Bridgeman & Elizabeth Drury eds., The British Eccentric, Michael Joseph, 1975.
- Richard Darwall, Madcap's Progress: the life of the eccentric Regency sportsman John Mytton, J.M. Dent, 1938.
- Jean Holdsworth, Mango: the Life and Times of Squire John Mytton of Halston 1796-1834, Dobson, 1972. ISBN 0-234-77608-0

Parliament of the United Kingdom
Preceded by Richard Lyster; Henry Grey Bennet	Member of Parliament for Shrewsbury; 1819–1820; With: Henry Grey Bennet	Succeeded by Panton Corbett; Henry Grey Bennet
