= Austerberry =

Austerberry is a surname. Notable people with the surname include:

- Horace Austerberry (1868–1946), British football manager
- Paul Denham Austerberry (born 1966), Canadian production designer
- Sidney Austerberry (1908–1996), Anglican archdeacon

For the legal case of Austerberry v Oldham Corporation, regarding positive covenants concerning land, see Positive covenant.
