= Jack Holt =

Jack Holt may refer to:

- Jack Holt (actor) (1888–1951)
- Jack Holt (dinghy designer) (1912–1995)
- Jack Holt (horse trainer) (c. 1880–1951), Australian racehorse trainer and philanthropist
- Jack Holt, character in Outcasts (TV series)
- Johnny Holt, also known as Jack Holt (1865–1937), Everton, Reading and England footballer
- Jack Holt (footballer) (1883–1921), Australian rules footballer
- Jack Holt (musician) (fl. 1980s–2020s), Australian musician
- Jack Holt Jr. (1929–2023), American attorney and chief justice of the Arkansas Supreme Court

== See also ==
- John Holt (disambiguation)
