= Rocester =

Village in Staffordshire, England

Coordinates: 52.951°N 1.838°W

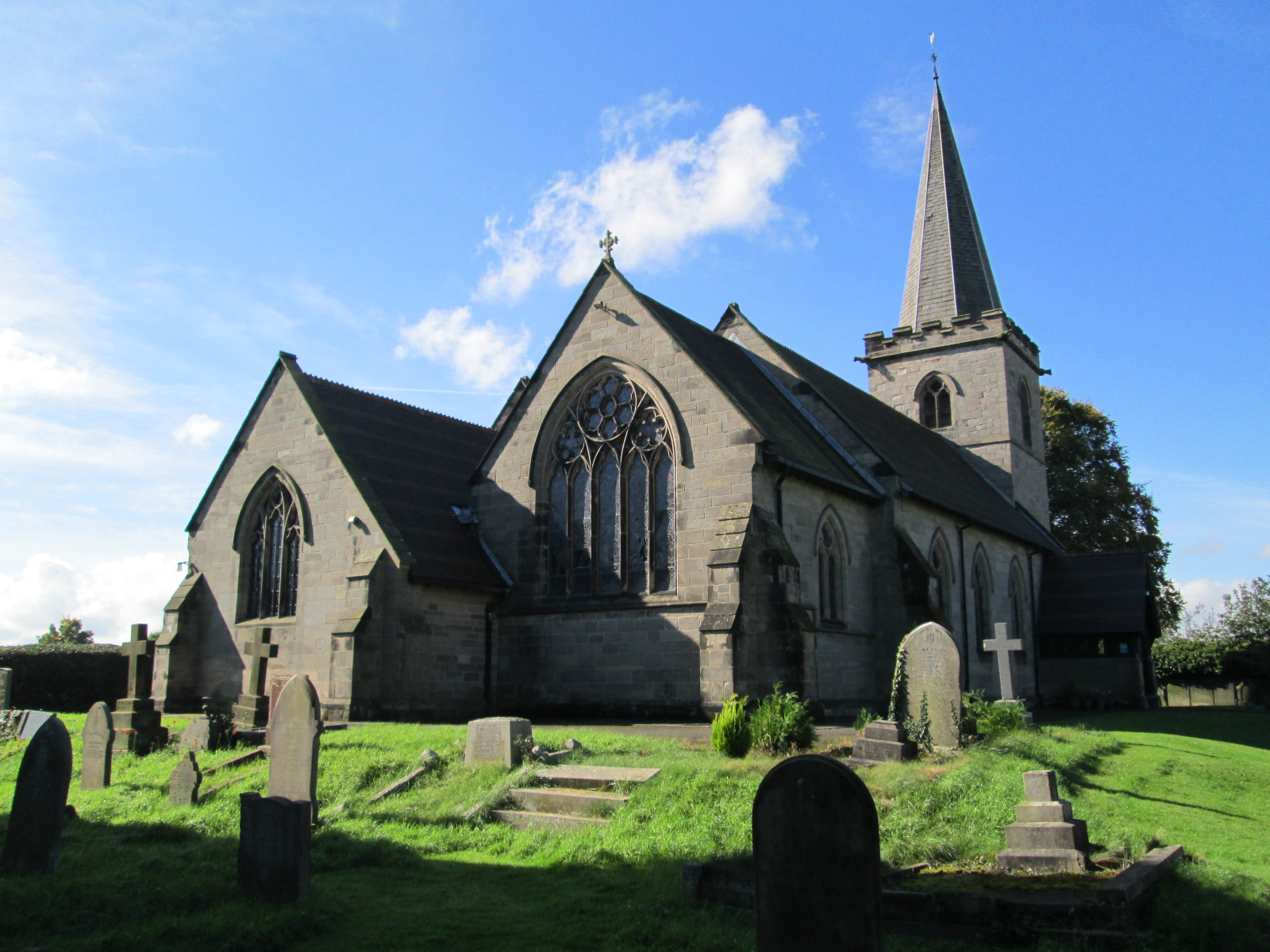
- St Michael's Church, Rocester

- Location within Staffordshire
- Population: 1,700 (2011)
- OS grid reference: SK109393
- District: East Staffordshire
- Shire county: Staffordshire
- Region: West Midlands
- Country: England
- Sovereign state: United Kingdom
- Post town: UTTOXETER
- Postcode district: ST14
- Dialling code: 01889
- Police: Staffordshire
- Fire: Staffordshire
- Ambulance: West Midlands
- UK Parliament: Burton

Rocester /ˈroʊstər/ is a village and civil parish in the East Staffordshire district of Staffordshire, England. Its name is spelt Rowcestre in the Domesday Book of 1086. It is located on the Derbyshire border.

== Geography ==
The village is about 4 miles (6.4 km) north of Uttoxeter and 8.5 miles (13.7 km) southwest of Ashbourne, situated on the county border with Derbyshire. According to the 2001 census the parish had a population of 1,431. The village lies on a triangle of land between the River Churnet and River Dove, which join to the south. The parish borders, from the south going clockwise, the parishes of Uttoxeter Rural, Croxden, Denstone, Ellastone, all in East Staffordshire, and then Norbury and Roston, Marston Montgomery and Doveridge, all in the Derbyshire Dales district of Derbyshire.

== History ==
A Roman fort was founded on the site in about 69 AD, as an intermediate point between Derby and Newcastle-under-Lyme on a route later known as Long Lane. The remains of the earthworks can still be seen. After the Romans departed in about 400 AD, the village remained in use by the Anglo-Saxons throughout the Middle Ages.

In 1141 the St Mary's Augustinian Abbey was built on the site now known as Abbey Fields. The order was disbanded in 1538; the abbey and its chapel were demolished and a manor house was built on the site.

The village church, St Michael's, was constructed in the 13th century. It was mostly rebuilt in 1873, although the tower is the original.

In 1781 Richard Arkwright bought an old corn mill on the River Dove and converted it to a water-powered cotton mill. This introduced industry to a predominantly agricultural community. With industry came the canal and railway networks, and Rocester became an important trading point. The mill was a great driving force in the expansion of the village; its owners were responsible for much building in the village. The mill has now been converted into the JCB Academy.

On 1 August 1849 Rocester railway station was opened by the North Staffordshire Railway and closed on 4 January 1965.

== Modern times ==
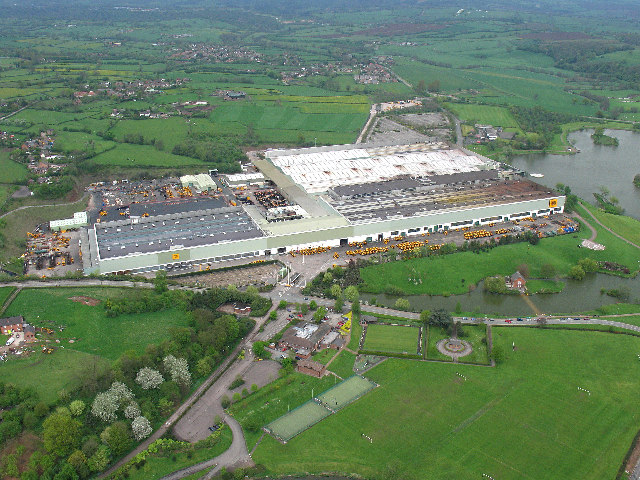
JCB site at Rocester

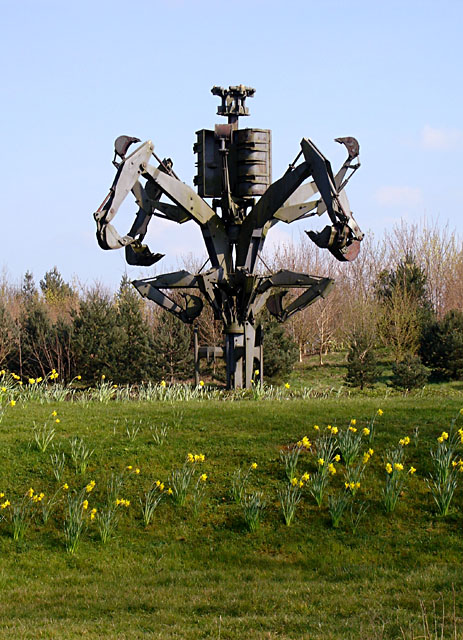
The Fossor, at the JCB headquarters

The mill remained the primary employer until the 1950s, and finally closed in 1985. By this time another major employer had arrived in the village, JCB. The present factory, on the site of the original 1950s factory, was opened in 1970 and is the world headquarters for the company.

There are a number of sculptures around the JCB site and landscaped parkland nearby. Most significant of these is The Fossor, which takes its name from the Latin fossor i.e. digger. The steel sculpture, created by Walenty Pytel, is made entirely of digger parts. It weighs 36 tonnes, stands 45 ft (14 m) high and was the largest steel sculpture in Europe at the time of its creation in 1979. It can be seen from the B5030 road that passes it.

The village has several businesses, a school, a pre-school and a church. Rocester is home to the football team Rocester F.C.

Rocester lies on the Staffordshire Way, and is the southern terminus of the Limestone Way, a footpath which runs 46 miles (74 km) north to Castleton in the Peak District.

== Notable people ==
- Elizabeth Trentham, Countess of Oxford (born in Rocester, died 1612), the second wife of the Elizabethan courtier and poet Edward de Vere, 17th Earl of Oxford
- Winifred, Lady Strickland (1645–1725), a member of the Jacobite court in exile, baptised at Rocester
- M. J. B. Baddeley (1843–1906), a distinguished English guidebook writer, his guide to the Lake District was first published in 1880 and remained in print to least 1978.
- Brigadier-General Charles Lyon, CB CMG DSO (1878 at The Lodge, Rocester – 1959), soldier who also played first-class cricket for Derbyshire in 1902.
- Graeme Edge (1941–2021), musician, songwriter, poet, drummer and one of the songwriters for the Moody Blues
- John Hall (born 1941), Vicar of Rocester 1988–1998, Archdeacon of Salop 1998-2011

=== Sport ===
- George Harris (born 1877), footballer, played 23 games for Stoke City.
- Peter Swanwick (born 1945), a former cricketer, played one game for Staffordshire
- Ryan Boot (born 1994), footballer, played 23 pro games for Port Vale F.C. and 193 for Solihull Moors F.C.

== See also ==
- Listed buildings in Rocester
