= John Hall (Archdeacon of Salop) =

John Barrie Hall (born 27 May 1941) was Archdeacon of Salop from 1998 until 2011.

Hall was a self employed in the caravan industry until 1982. He studied for the priesthood at Salisbury & Wells Theological College, and was later ordained as a deacon in 1984 and as a priest in 1985. After a curacy in Cheddleton, Hall was Vicar of Rocester from 1988 to 1998.
