= Peter Swanwick (cricketer) =

English cricketer (born 1945)

Personal information
- Full name: Peter Michael Swanwick
- Born: 10 December 1945 (age 80); Rocester, Staffordshire, England
- Batting: Right-handed
- Role: Wicket-keeper

Domestic team information
- Years: Team
- 1967–1971: Staffordshire

Career statistics
Competition	List A
Matches	1
Runs scored	1
Batting average	–
100s/50s	–/–
Top score	1*
Balls bowled	–
Wickets	–
Bowling average	–
5 wickets in innings	–
10 wickets in match	–
Best bowling	–
Catches/stumpings	1/–
- Source: Cricinfo, 18 June 2011

Peter Michael Swanwick (born 10 December 1945) is a former English cricketer. Swanwick was a right-handed batsman who fielded as a wicket-keeper. He was born in Rocester, Staffordshire.

Swanwick made his debut for Staffordshire in the 1967 Minor Counties Championship against the Lancashire Second XI. Swanwick played Minor counties cricket for Staffordshire from 1967 to 1971, which included 39 Minor Counties Championship matches. In 1971, he made his only List A appearance against Glamorgan in the Gillette Cup. In this match, he scored a single unbeaten run, with Staffordshire losing by 77 runs.
