= Listed buildings in Rocester =

Rocester is a civil parish in the district of East Staffordshire, Staffordshire, England. It contains 15 buildings that are recorded in the National Heritage List for England. Of these, two are listed at Grade II*, the middle grade, and the others are at Grade II, the lowest grade. The parish contains the village of Rocester and the surrounding area. The listed buildings include houses and associated structures, cottages, a church and a cross in the churchyard, a farmhouse, a former public house, a former cotton mill, two mills, two bridges and a causeway.

== Key ==
Grade	Criteria
II*	Particularly important buildings of more than special interest
II	Buildings of national importance and special interest

== Buildings ==
Name and location	Photograph	Date	Notes	Grade
Churchyard cross 52.95181°N 1.83524°W		13th century	The cross is in the churchyard of St Michael's Church. It is in stone and has four circular steps, and a three-tier plinth with convex mouldings. On this stands a quadrilobe shaft about 20 feet (6.1 m) high with dog-tooth ornament on two sides. The head is missing. The cross is a scheduled monument.	II*
St Michael's Church; 52.95166°N 1.83522°W		13th century	The church was largely rebuilt in 1870–72 by Ewan Christian. It is in stone with tile roofs, and consists of a nave, a north porch, a south aisle, a chancel and south vestry, and a west steeple. The steeple has a tower of three stages with a narrow west window, a clock face on the west side, an embattled parapet with corner gargoyles, and a recessed spire.	II
Dove Lane Farm Cottage; 52.95274°N 1.83534°W	—	17th century	A timber framed cottage with painted brick infill, painted brick gables, and a tile roof. There is one storey and an attic, and three bays. The windows are casements, and there are gabled dormers. Inside is an inglenook fireplace.	II
Rose Cottage; 52.95130°N 1.84022°W	—	17th century	The cottage was later altered and extended. The early part is timber framed with brick infill on a painted stone plinth, the later parts are in brick painted to resemble timber framing, and the roof is tiled. There are two storeys, two bays, and the extensions are at the rear. The windows are casements and inside is an inglenook fireplace.	II
Banks Farmhouse; 52.94797°N 1.85398°W	—	Early 18th century	The farmhouse is in red brick with quoins, a pilaster strip on the left with stone insets, a band, a moulded eaves course, and a hipped tile roof. There are two storeys on a high basement, and two bays, the right bay being a three-storey embattled tower, also on a basement, with a plan of five sides of an octagon. In the tower is a blocked vertical oval window, the other windows being casements with panelled aprons, many blind, and some with rusticated surrounds. The windows in the tower have moulded architraves and projecting triple keystones. Inside there are two pairs of upper crucks. (Note: Pevsner refers to the building as "a folly or gazebo".)	II*
58 High Street; 52.95128°N 1.83987°W	—	Early 18th century	A red brick house with bands, a dentilled eaves course, and a tile roof with coped verges on kneelers. There are two storeys and two bays. The central doorway has a reeded surround, a rectangular fanlight, and a cornice hood, and the windows are sashes with painted keyblocks.	II
The Old Vicarage; 52.95215°N 1.83553°W	—	Mid 18th century	The vicarage, which was later extended, is in red brick with a hipped tile roof. There are two storeys and seven bays. On the front is a gabled porch and a doorway with a rectangular fanlight, and the windows are sashes. On the east front is a three-light canted bay window.	II
Queens Arms Hotel; 52.95237°N 1.83832°W		Late 18th century	The former public house is in red brick on a shallow stone plinth and has a band. There are two storeys, a linear plan with a front of three bays, and parallel rear ranges. The central doorway has a bracketed canopy, and above it is a panel for a former inn sign with a moulded surround. The outer bays contain three-light casement windows with segmental heads.	II
Tutbury Mill; 52.95029°N 1.83343°W		c. 1782	A cotton mill built by Richard Arkwright, and later altered and extended. It is in red brick on a sandstone plinth, and has a coved eaves course, and tiled roofs with coped verges. There is a T-shaped plan with two parallel ranges, four storeys and 24 bays, a tower at the rear, and a 20th-century extension. The windows have slightly segmental heads, shaped lintels and raised keystones.	II
Churnet Bridge and causeway 52.95093°N 1.84364°W		Early 19th century	The bridge carries High Street over the River Churnet. It is a hump back bridge in stone, and consists of three semicircular arches, the middle the largest, and has a parapet band and a parapet rising to a point in the centre. The bridge continues as a causeway to the west for about 35 yards (32 m), and includes a small segmental arch.	II
Millholme; 52.94999°N 1.83404°W	—	Early 19th century	A red brick house, which was later extended, with sill bands, a moulded eaves cornice, and a hipped tile roof. The main block has three storeys and three bays, and to the left are two two-storey recessed extensions. The central doorway has a moulded architrave and a pediment, and is flanked by canted bay windows with openwork parapets. The windows are sashes, those in the outer bays with shaped lintels grooved as voussoirs and triple raised keystones. In the central bay the windows have moulded architraves, the one in the middle floor with a cornice hood.	II
Former Coach House, Millholme; 52.95015°N 1.83414°W	—	Early 19th century	The former coach house is in red brick with a band and a hipped slate roof. There are two storeys and three bays, the middle bay projecting slightly under a pediment, and containing a lunette in the upper floor and a blind window and a louvred opening in the ground floor. The outer bays have round-headed recesses, and contain small-paned windows in the upper floor.	II
Milepost at N.G.R. SK 10743992; 52.95714°N 1.84094°W		Mid to late 19th century	The milepost is to the north of the junction of the B5030 and B5031 roads. It is in cast iron and has a triangular plan and a chamfered top, On the top is inscribed "ROCESTER" and on the sides are the distances to Ellastone, Ashbourne, Rocester, and Uttoxeter.	II
Rocester Bridge; 52.94993°N 1.82957°W		Mid 19th century	The bridge carries Mill Street over the River Dove. It is in sandstone, and consists of a single segmental arch. The bridge has a moulded string course, a coped parapet with a hollow chamfered under edge, and buttresses with pyramidal caps. The abutments end in piers with an oblong section and pyramidal caps.	II
Podmore's Mill; 52.95077°N 1.84335°W		Late 19th century	The former cotton mill is in stone and has a tile roof. There are three storeys and eight bays. The windows are casements with segmental heads, some of which are blank.	II

== Notes and references ==
=== Sources ===
- Historic England, "Cross approximately 40 yards north of Church of St. Michael, Rocester (1231920)", National Heritage List for England
- Historic England, "Cross in Rocester churchyard, Rocester (1006105)", National Heritage List for England
- Historic England, "Church of St. Michael, Rocester (1231919)", National Heritage List for England
- Historic England, "Dove Lane Farm Cottage, Rocester (1231921)", National Heritage List for England
- Historic England, "Rose Cottage, Rocester (1231924)", National Heritage List for England
- Historic England, "Banks Farmhouse, Rocester (1231926)", National Heritage List for England
- Historic England, "No. 58 High Street, Rocester (1277337)", National Heritage List for England
- Historic England, "The Old Vicarage, Rocester (1277335)", National Heritage List for England
- Historic England, "Queens Arms Hotel, Rocester (1244404)", National Heritage List for England
- Historic England, "Tutbury Mill, Rocester (1277295)", National Heritage List for England
- Historic England, "Churnet Bridge and causeway to West, Rocester (1231922)", National Heritage List for England
- Historic England, "Millholme, Rocester (1231996)", National Heritage List for England
- Historic England, "Former Coach house immediately north-east of Millholme, Rocester (1231925)", National Heritage List for England
- Historic England, "Milepost at N.G.R. SK 10743992, Rocester (1231908)", National Heritage List for England
- Historic England, "Rocester Bridge, Rocester (1231040)", National Heritage List for England
- Historic England, "Podmore's Mill, Rocester (1231923)", National Heritage List for England
- Historic England, Listed Buildings
- Pevsner, Nikolaus (1974), Staffordshire, The Buildings of England, Harmondsworth: Penguin Books, ISBN 0-14-071046-9
