= Garth (Guilsfield) =

Garth, Guilsfield
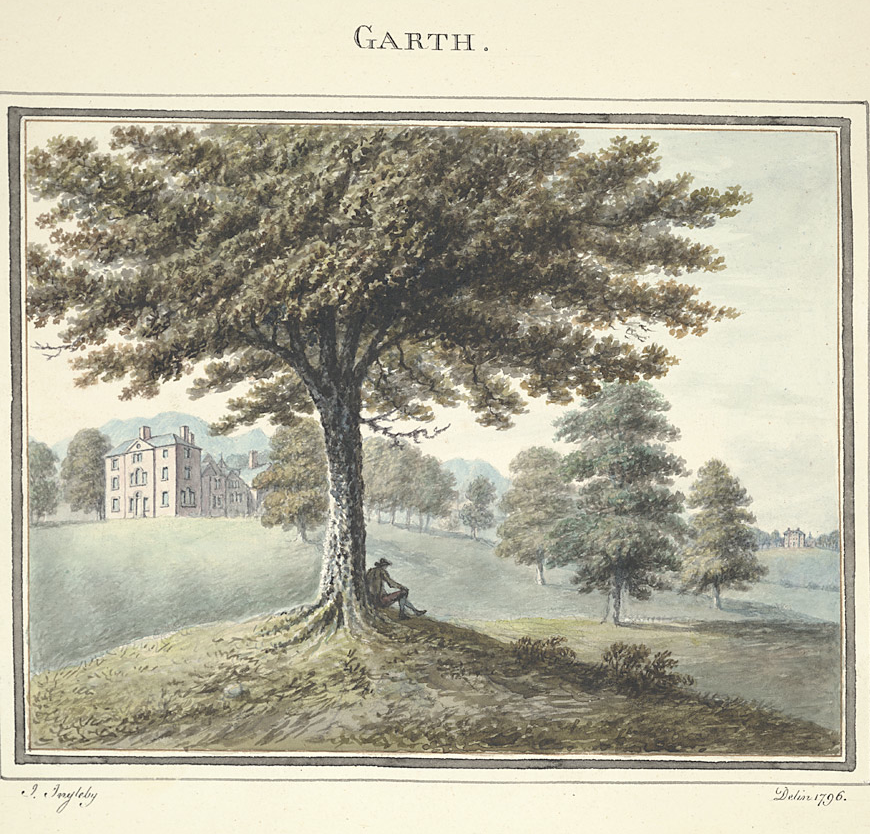
- Garth, Guilsfield in 1796

- Location in Montgomeryshire
- 52.687657°N 3.164550°W
- Location: Guilsfield, Montgomeryshire, Wales

History
- Built: c.1800 for Devereux Mytton.
- Demolished: 1947

Site notes
- Architectural style: Strawberry Hill Gothic

Garth was an important early gothic revival house in the township of Garth in Guilsfield in Montgomeryshire. In the 18th century it became the home of the Mytton family who had originally been Shrewsbury drapers, who derived their wealth from the Montgomeryshire woollen industry. They had settled at Pontysgawrhyd in Meifod and at Halston in Shropshire. The most famous members of the family were General Mytton, the Parliamentary Commander in the Civil War in the Marches and “Mad Jack Mytton”, the eccentric 19th-century squire of Halston. In 1809 a grandiose rebuilding scheme was started by Richard Mytton. However, this together with extravagant furnishing of the new house and reckless purchasing of surrounding farms, which culminated in the purchase of the Trefnannau estate in 1812 for £33,625, led to financial problems. The Myttons struggled to afford to live in style in this house, and it is likely that Richard Mytton's outlay on lands, the building of Garth and its furnishing cost nearly £100,000 The family continued to live in the house until it was damaged by fire in 1922. Thereafter, there was a gradual decline, leading to the sale of the remainder of the estate in August 1945 and the demolition of the house for salvage during the winter of 1946–7. The remnants of the garden and park are listed at Grade II on the Cadw/ICOMOS Register of Parks and Gardens of Special Historic Interest in Wales.

== Earlier history ==
Garth is a historic site of considerable antiquity. It may have been the home of Sir Griffith Vychan who had fought at Agincourt in 1415, and was descended from Brochwel Ysgithrog, Prince of Powys. Humphrey Wynn of Garth who was buried in September 1579 was fourth in descent from Gruffydd Fychan. His descendant was Brochwel Wynn who died in April 1717 leaving a 14-year-old heiress, Dorothy. She was quickly drawn into marriage with the 33-year-old squire of Pontysgawrhyd, Richard Mytton, in July 1717. With this marriage, Garth passed to the Mytton family. Richard Mytton extended the estates by purchases in the decades leading to his death at the age of 90 in 1773, and this process of expansion was continued by his son Devereux Mytton in the years leading to his death at the age of 84 in May 1809. His son Richard died before him in 1802, and his heir was therefore his young grandson, Richard, born in 1783. Shortly after he came of age, the young Richard Mytton entered into an unpleasant case in the Chancery Court, where he accused his grandfather of committing waste on the estate in the felling of timber worth £3,200. The case is interesting in that it sheds light on Devereux Mytton's purchasing of lands and his building of a new house at Garth about 1775.

In July 1816, Richard Mytton's reckless expenditure finally caught up with him. He had funded his building and land purchasing schemes in part by a series of loans and the sales of life annuities, and in part by using funds that he held in hand as a receiver general of taxes for the counties of Brecknockshire, Radnorshire and Montgomeryshire. He found himself in debt to the Treasury to the tune of £24,618 and on 5 July 1816 the Treasury issued a writ seizing his entire estate. The Mytton family hastily left for France. However, by the skilful use of Trusts, the family managed to retain Garth and most of its estate. Particularly important to this was a trust deed of February 1827 which gave full control of the estates to Mytton's former college friend, Viscount Clive, later Edward Herbert, 2nd Earl of Powis. After the death of Richard Mytton in 1828, his widow Charlotte - the daughter of John Herbert of Dolforgan Hall. - finally returned to live at Garth in 1840, and in July 1854 the trust came to an end with the overall burden of debt reduced to £54,000. Her son, Richard Herbert Mytton now took up the estates following a distinguished career in the Bengal Civil Service, which he relinquished a year earlier. In 1856 he became High Sheriff of Montgomeryshire. His son Devereux Herbert Mytton succeeded him on his death in 1869.

== The Myth of Mytton the Nabob ==
Much of the allure of Garth lies in the financial crisis that the young Richard Mytton brought upon himself in the building of his fantastical house. With expenditure amounting to not far off £100,000 on an estate rental of about £4,600 a year, a crash was inevitable. His first attempt to place his affairs in trust in June 1816 came to nothing when his trustee, his neighbour Edward Heyward of Crosswood declined to act. As the Treasury moved in to collect its debt, and to avoid his other creditors, the Mytton family fled to France, apparently to Boulogne, to avoid bankruptcy and the debtors' prison. His affairs appear to have been managed by his friend, Lord Clive, but, with the immediate crisis over and presumably in much straitened circumstances, he returned to England by 1818, when he was admitted to St. John's College, Cambridge. He gained a Bachelor of Laws Degree in 1820 and was ordained by the Bishop of Hereford, and was curate of Trelystan from 1820 to 1826. He left for India in February 1827 and in this year the Revd Richard Mytton, late of Garth, now of Calcutta, East Indies had to make over further lands to the commissioners of taxes in consideration of a large sum of money owed to Crown. Mytton died in February 1828, and there is a memorial in Guilsfield Church describing him as chaplain of Barrackpore, Bengal and to the Governor General of India. At the time of his death on 23rd Feb 1828, the Revd Richard Mytton was on board the Palmyra, returning from India to England. The suggestion that Mytton made a fortune in India, which he used to fund the building of Garth is clearly a myth, and the house that he and his wife built at Garth owed no references to Mughal architecture. Rather, the house was in what Loudon himself described as his "Cathedral Style" of the "Gothic or pointed style", deriving from Loudon's enthusiasm for what is now referred to as the Perpendicular Gothic.

== Georgian house ==
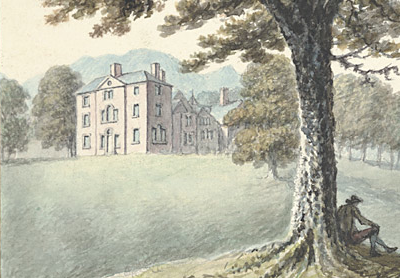
Garth, Guilsfield. Watercolour by John Ingleby, 1796 NLW PD9170

In July 1786 Thomas Pennant passed the house on a tour through Montgomeryshire. He records The Country from Poole (Welshpool) towards Llanymynach is most beautifully broken into gentle rising, prettily wooded. .....Pass by the Garth, the seat of Devereux Mytton, Esq. Pennant had a particular interest as he was related to William Mytton of Halston, an antiquary, whose notes he used extensively. Pennant in 1796 commissioned John Ingleby to produce a watercolour of the old house at Garth, which presumably he intended to use as an illustration for a future edition of the Tour in Wales. This watercolour, which is now in the collections of the National Library of Wales, appears to be the only surviving depiction of the old hall, shown on a hill in the wooded countryside. Ingleby's watercolour shows that a new house had been placed in front of earlier buildings, possibly timber-framed, of the Wynn family. This new house was built about 1775 by Devereux Mytton, probably about the time of his second marriage to his distant cousin Eleanora Devereux.

== Architecture ==
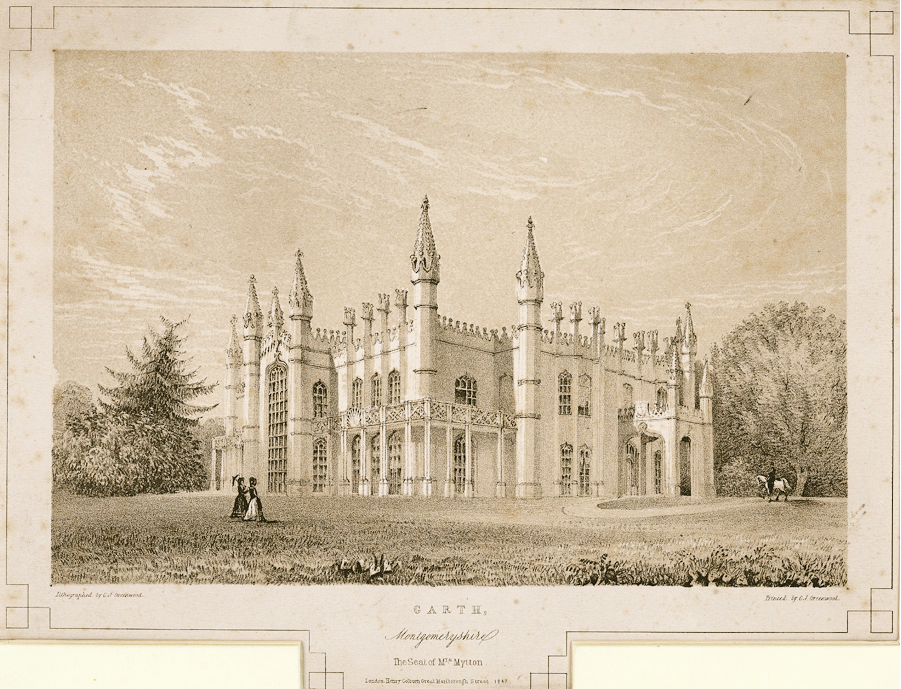
Garth, Guilsfield. Lithographic print of Garth, by C. J. Greenwood. Published by Henry Colborn 1847

The rebuilding of Garth commenced in 1809, although Richard and Charlotte Mytton, inspired by Loudon's Treatise on Forming, Improving and Managing Country Residences of 1806, may have been imagining and planning a new house even before his grandfather died in May 1809. The architect was John C. Loudon, and he published an initial elevation and plan in his 1812 publication Observations on laying out Farms in the Scotch Style, adapted to England. Here he stated that the scheme "began to be executed in May 1809", very soon, therefore, after Devereux Mytton died. However, for some reason, the Myttons dispensed with their architect, and when Katherine Plymley was shown around the house by Charlotte Mytton as it approached completion in September 1814, she noted that "she and Mr Mytton have been their own architects".

Garth was built in Gothic Revival style with decorative diagonal buttresses and graceful crocketed spires. The smooth, rather bare walls were faced with yellow-grey stone, probably from the Cefn quarry near Minera. The windows have flat ogee profiles and arched merlons with ball-finials. From the centre of the south front the saloon projected - turreted, and with a vast traceried window, above which, the crenellation rose and fell. A veranda extended along this front and was wrapped round the octagonal bow at one end. There is a resemblance to Thomas Johnes’ Hafod in Ceredigion, which was gothicised by John Nash (architect) in 1791-4. In particular, the top lantern tower at Hafod over the library is very similar to the lantern tower over the stairs at Garth. The design of Garth was conservative; in many respects is harked back to Horace Walpole's Strawberry Hill, with very similar interior fan-vaulting and plaster-work to that at Strawberry Hill, while the columns of the veranda and exterior balcony are reminiscent of the work of the Shrewsbury architect Thomas Farnolls Pritchard. From what is known of the interior layout, the principal rooms led from the entrance-staircase hall with its soaring columns and octagonal lantern, to a dining room, library, saloon and drawing room where the finest plasterwork was to be seen.

=== Design of the Riding House or Stables ===
The ground plan of these stables was designed by us (Loudon) in 1809 for the late Col. Mytton of Garth, Montgomeryshire; and it is proper to observe the principal object in view was, to provide accommodation for breeding and breaking of a superior description of riding horses. The situation on which these stables were placed was the summit of an elevated knoll, protruding from the side of a hill; and their effect was remarkably good from all the surrounding country. The elevation actually executed from our design was different from either of those now given (figs 1702 and 1703), and, we need not say, much inferior; the later having been suggested and sketched for us by Barry, and prepared for the engraver by Mr Lamb. Fig 1702 is in the Italian style and fig 1703 is in Tudor Gothic. The form of a riding-house is generally that of a parallelogram:though that at Brighton, some in London and the veranda at Garth ...are circular.

— John Claudius Loudon ‘’ Encyclopædia of Cottage, Farm, and Villa Architecture and Furniture.’’ Longmans, London. pp965 and 966
1839

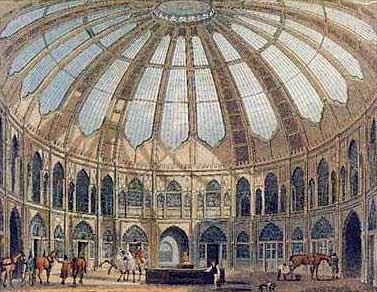
Porden's Riding House at Brighton

The plans for the circular riding house at Garth were probably derived from Porden's Riding House at the Royal Pavilion, Brighton (1804-8). Some twenty-five years later, in 1834, Loudon returned to his scheme for the stables at Garth of which he was clearly very proud. Indeed, it was the one element of his 1809 design that was least altered in execution. In 1834 he published two further designs for a circular riding house, one of which he said was by Charles Barry and the other by himself. The Garth stables were circular, 84 ft in diameter, with triangular merlons, ogee windows again, and with an external covered passage (with cast-iron stations) all round, where horses – even with carriages - could be exercised out of the rain. The loose-boxes were arranged radially, in a round-house. Today, only the mid-C19 brick farm buildings of an adjoining home farm complex survive. The arrangement is a huge three-sided courtyard, entered between barns at the top; at the ends of the arms are two cottages.

== Gallery: Loudon's later plans for a Riding House based on that at Garth ==
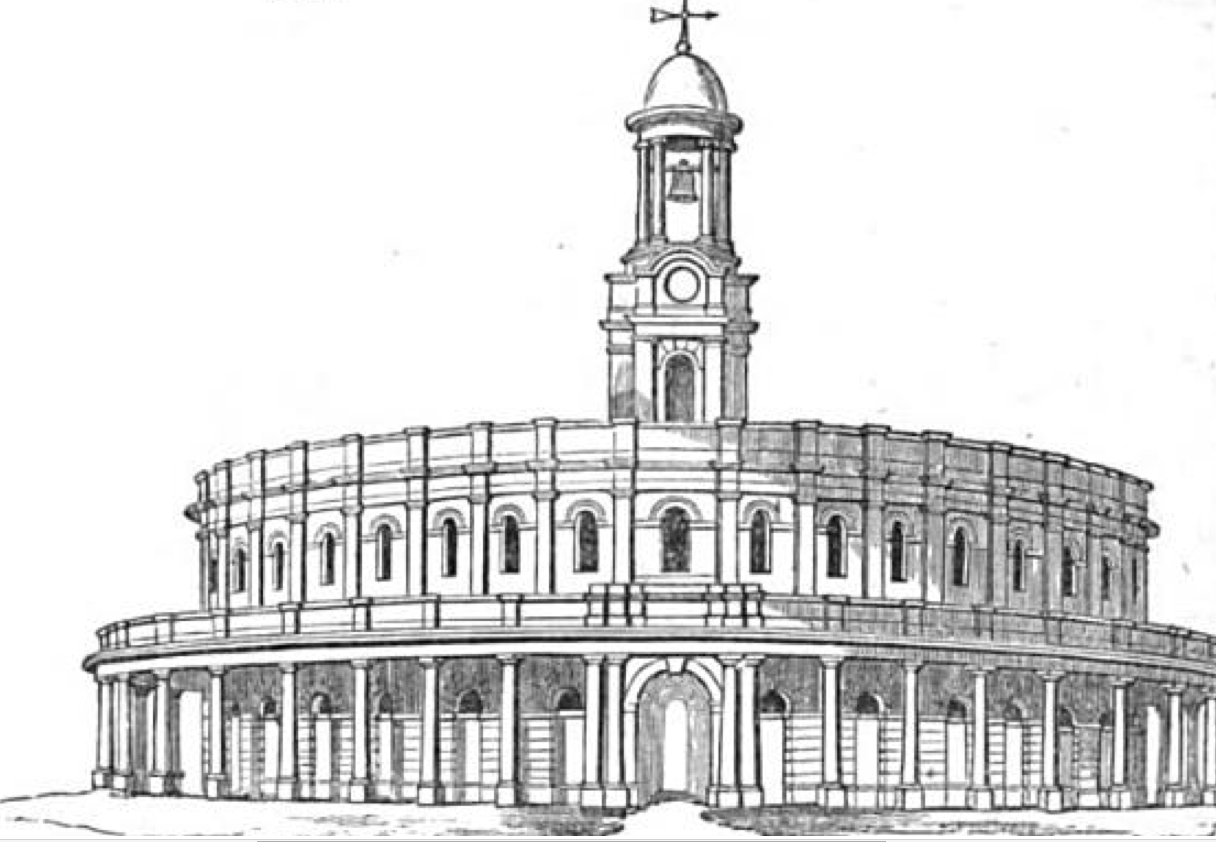
Design by Charles Barry

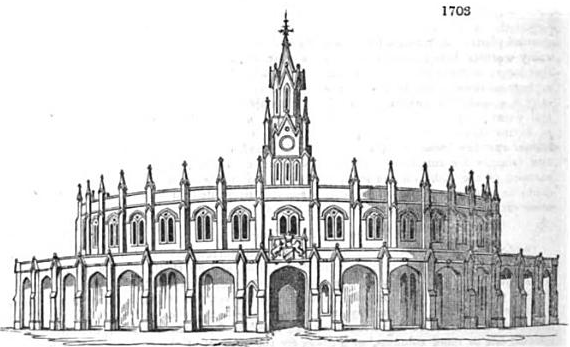
Design by J CLoudon

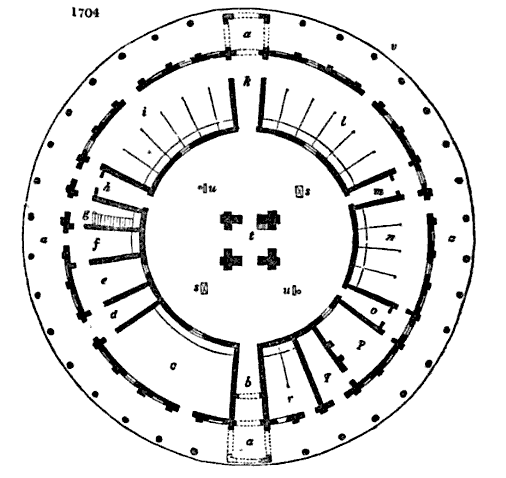
Plan of interior.

== Literature ==
- Humphreys, Melvin, Garth: Estate, Architecture and Family, Welshpool, 2020.
- Humphreys, Melvin, The Crisis of Community: Montgomeryshire 1680-1815, University of Wales Press, Cardiff, 1996.
- Lloyd, T.,(1986) The Lost houses of Wales, p. 41.
- Pughe, G. R.(Rev), (1890), Mytton of Garth, Montgomeryshire Collections, Vol 24, 277–294.
- Scourfield R and Haslam R, (2013) Buildings of Wales: Powys; Montgomeryshire, Radnorshire and Breconshire, 2nd edition, Yale University Press, p. 133-134.
