= John Woodhouse (priest) =

English Anglican priest

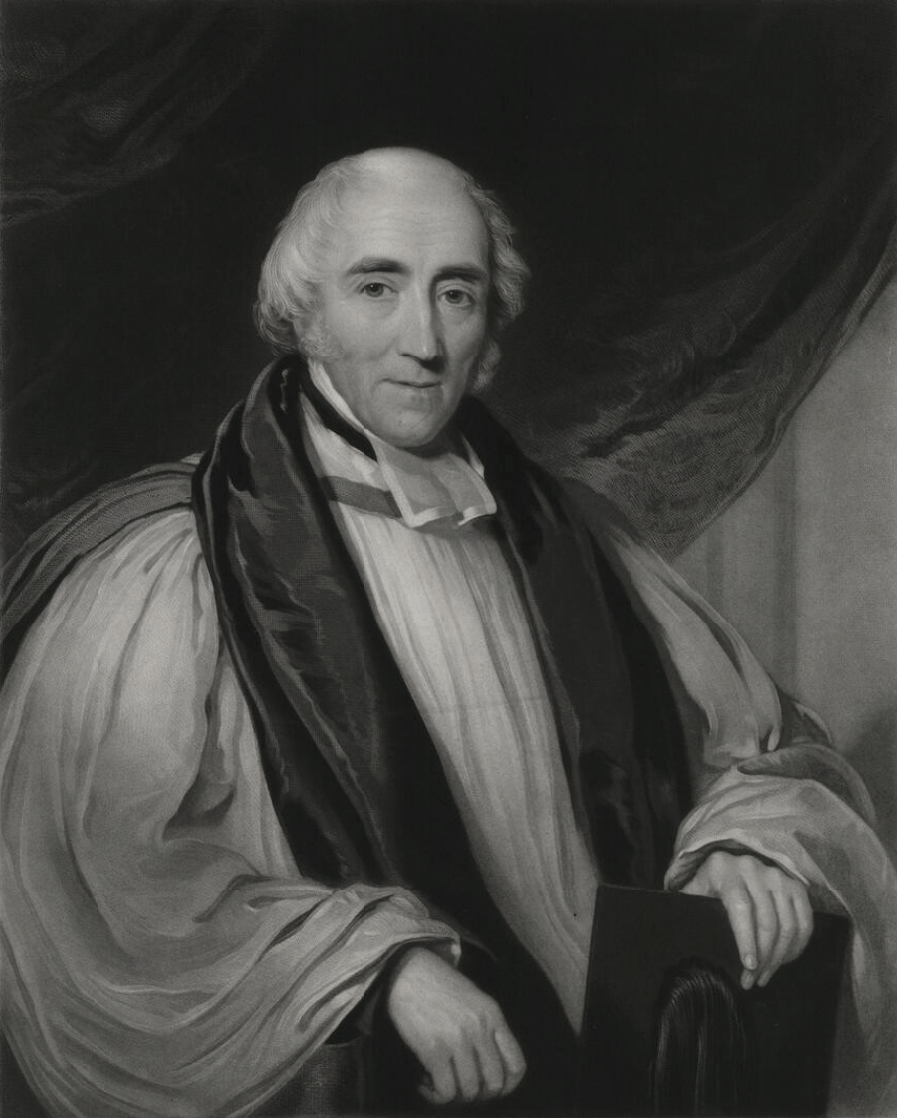
John Chappel Woodhouse

John Chappel Woodhouse (Note: His middle name is frequently misspelt Chappell.) (1749 – 17 November 1833) was an English Anglican priest who was Archdeacon of Salop from 17 October 1798 until 24 December 1821; and Dean of Lichfield from 1807 until his death.

Woodhouse was born at Lichfield, son of William, a physician, and his wife, Mary Mompesson, granddaughter and heiress of William Chappel. He was educated at Christ Church, Oxford. He held incumbencies at Donington, Shropshire and Stoke on Trent.

In 1805, he published Woodhouse's Annotations on the Apocalypse, which was well received. He married Mercy Peate (or Peet), with whom he had a son, Chappel Woodhouse (1780–1815), who married Amelia Oakeley, daughter of Sir Charles Oakeley, 1st Baronet; and two daughters, Ellen Jane and Mary Anne. His daughter Ellen married firstly, Rev. William Robinson, Rector of Swinnerton; secondly, Hugh Dyke Acland, second son of Sir Thomas Dyke Acland, 9th Baronet; and thirdly, Richard Hinckley of Beacon House, Lichfield.

Woodhouse died on 17 November 1833.

== Bibliography ==
- Woodhouse, John Chappel (1805). The Apocalypse : or Revelation of Saint John, translated; with notes, critical and explanatory. London: J. Brettell.
- Woodhouse, John Chappel (1811). A short account of Lichfield Cathedral; more particularly of the painted glass with which its windows are adorned. Lichfield: T.G. Lomax.
- Woodhouse, John Chappel (1834). A short account of the city and close of Lichfield: to which is added a short account of the cathedral. Lichfield: T.G. Lomax.
