= Oswestry Race Course =

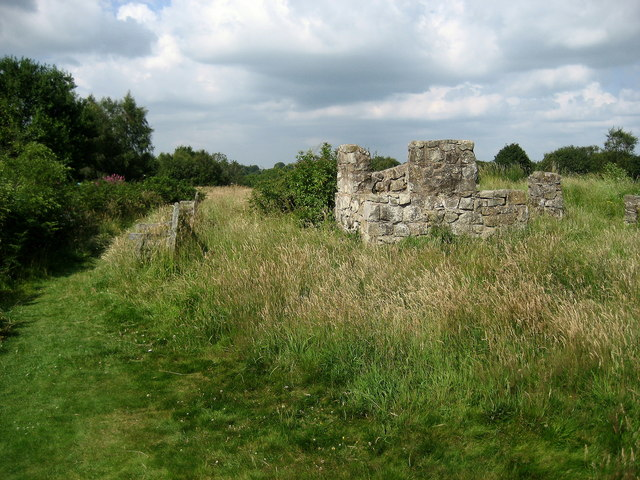
Old grandstand at the former Oswestry Race Course photo: Chris Heaton, geograph.org.uk

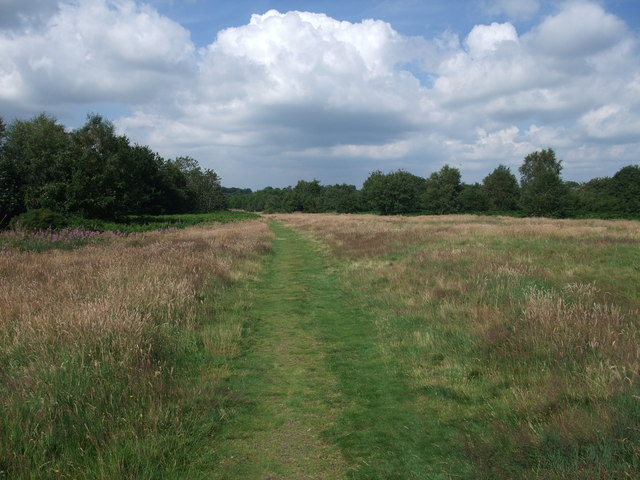
Offa's Dyke Path passes through the site photo: Tim Heaton geograph.org.uk

Oswestry Race Course (also known as Oswestry Old Racecourse Common) is a historic racecourse on ‘Cyrn y Bwch’ hill close to Oswestry in Shropshire that was used by the Welsh and English to socialise and race horses. Covering an area of 22 hectares (54 acres), the course was closed to racing in 1848 and is now an area of common land for recreation. It is a well travelled walking route because Offa's Dyke Path passes through the site, although the dyke itself lies to the west.

== Location and facilities ==
The common is located west of Oswestry, by the B4580 road. A limited amount of parking is available at South Common, and Tanat Valley Coaches route No 78 from Oswestry also stops by the site.

The common contains both informal and public footpaths, which are mostly easy grass paths with some steeper routes leading west. There is access for horseriders and a variety of picnic sites and seats. The Llanymynech to Chirk Mill section of Offa's Dyke Path (a national trail) crosses the common.

== History ==
This site is located on a 1,000 feet (305 m) hilltop called 'Cyrn y Bwch', which translates as ‘Horns of the Buck’ and was historically seen as a barrier between England and Wales.

Racing is thought to have begun here in the early 17th century and the figure-of-eight track extended to 2 miles (3 km). Race meets lasted up to three days and, in the town of Oswestry, signalled the beginning of drinking and social events. The infamous Jack Mytton was among the local characters closely involved in these events, at one time owning a stable of 40 horses.

By the early 19th century, the racing was big business and it also brought large crowds, drinking, gambling and pickpockets and many people started to avoid the event. The arrival of the railways is thought to have contributed to the cessation of race meets as this enabled both horses and racegoers to travel further afield to the larger racecourses. The final meeting was held in September 1848, the same year that the Shrewsbury to Chester railway line opened.

Today, significant evidence of the old racecourse remains, including the remains of the figure-of-eight course and grandstand.

A commemorative sculpture of a double-horse head, made by local stonemason Mark Evans, pointing both ways to bordering Wales and into England, was unveiled in August 1993.

== Site characteristics and wildlife ==
Due to its elevation, there are extensive views of the surrounding countryside from the site. It has a variety of different habitats including, scrub, woodland, heathland, ponds, wildflowers and unimproved, and marshy grasslands. This supports a wide assortment of birds and insects, including willow warbler, chiffchaff and linnets. Oswestry Race Course was designated as a wildlife site in the 1999 Local Plan, and is officially registered as an area of common land.
