= Listed buildings in Whittington, Shropshire =

Whittington is a civil parish in Shropshire, England. In the parish are 24 listed buildings that are recorded in the National Heritage List for England. Of these, three are listed at Grade I, the highest of the three grades, and the others are at Grade II, the lowest grade. The parish contains the village of Whittington and the surrounding countryside. The oldest listed building consists of the remains of Whittington Castle, which is listed at Grade I and is a scheduled monument. Most of the other listed buildings are houses, cottages, farmhouses and farm buildings, the oldest of which are timber framed, or have a timber framed core. In the parish are two country houses, the largest of which, Halston Hall, is listed at Grade I, as is its domestic chapel, and other buildings associated with it are listed at Grade II. The rest of the listed buildings include a church, a sundial in the churchyard, a public house, a bridge over the Montgomery Canal, a former railway station, and a former level crossing keeper's cottage.

== Key ==
Grade	Criteria
I	Buildings of exceptional interest, sometimes considered to be internationally important
II	Buildings of national importance and special interest

== Buildings ==
Name and location	Photograph	Date	Notes	Grade
Whittington Castle; 52.87329°N 3.00272°W		c. 1212	The castle is built in limestone and most of it is ruinous. What survives of the main part are fragments of the walls of the inner bailey, parts of the bastions, the east tower of the inner gateway, and the footings of the keep. The outer gateway was rebuilt in the 19th century, and consists of two D-shaped towers flanking a chamfered moulded archway. The tower and archway are embattled and have a corbel table, and the tower contains casement windows with pointed heads in the upper part, and cross-shaped arrow slits in the lower part. The remains of the castle are also a scheduled monument.	I
4 and 6 Boot Street; 52.87462°N 3.00193°W	—	14th or 15th century	A house with a timber framed core and cruck construction, it was later remodelled, and in the 20th century it was altered and converted into two dwellings. It is in rendered brick with a dentilled eaves cornice, and two storeys. The windows are casements, and to the right is a massive stepped chimney breast. Inside, there is a true cruck truss.	II
Domestic Chapel, Halston Hall; 52.87511°N 2.98381°W	—	Early to mid or 15th century	The chapel is in an isolated site to the south of the hall, and the tower was added in about 1725. It is timber framed with painted brick infill on a chamfered stone plinth, and has a slate roof with cusped bargeboards. The church consists of a nave, a short chancel, and a west tower. The tower is in red brick, it contains windows with pointed heads, and has a pyramidal roof. The windows on the sides of the church are mullioned with three lights, and the east windows has three lights and a segmental head. There are two blocked squints.	I
Drenewydd; 52.87104°N 3.01591°W	—	Late 16th or early 17th century	A farmhouse that was later altered and extended. The earlier parts are timber framed, the later parts are in red brick, it is mainly rendered and has slate roofs. There are two storeys and attics, and a complex plan, consisting of a long hall range, a gabled cross-wing to the left, a full-height porch in the angle, a gabled wing parallel to the cross-wing, and three gables at the rear of the hall range. There are moulded bressumers in the hall range and porch. In the centre of the hall range is a bow window, and the other windows are mixed, and include a mullioned window, casements and sashes.	II
The Old Manor House; 52.87486°N 3.00206°W		c. 1610–20	The house is in red brick and has a slate roof with coped verges, carved kneelers, and ball finials. There are two storeys and attics, and the house originally had a U-shaped plan with a hall range at the front and projecting gables at the left and right, and the space between was filled by an outshut in the 18th century. The gables have dentilled eaves cornices and bands. The windows are casements, some with segmental heads, there is a raking eaves dormer, and the doorway in the gable end has a doorway, also with a segmental head.	II
Barn at Hen-hafod; 52.87749°N 2.95648°W	—	Early 17th century	The barn is timber framed with weatherboarding, and a slate roof. There are four bays, and the barn contains two full-height openings and an eaves hatch.	II
The Big House; 52.87201°N 3.00008°W	—	1631	A farmhouse, later a private house, it has been altered, and was extended in 1924. The earlier part is timber framed with plastered infill, partly rendered, the later parts have applied timbers, and the roofs are slated. There is one storey and an attic, and an H-shaped plan consisting of a two-bay hall range, a projecting gabled cross-wing to the left, and a full-height gabled wing added in 1924 to the right. The windows are latticed casements, and there are gabled dormers with finials.	II
Evenall Farmhouse; 52.88130°N 2.96494°W	—	Early to mid 17th century	The farmhouse was remodelled in the 19th century. It is in red brick with blue brick diapering, and has slate roofs with coped verges on carved stone kneelers. There are two storeys and attics. The house originally had a T-shaped plan with a two-bay hall range with a gabled cross-wing to the right, and the remodelling added a wing to give an H-shaped plan. The windows are mullioned and transomed, and in the gables are blind openings; all have moulded hood moulds. The doorway has pilasters and a rectangular latticed fanlight.	II
Great Fernhill Farmhouse; 52.88597°N 3.01678°W	—	Mid 17th century	The farmhouse, which was extended in the 18th century and later, is in red brick with a hipped slate roof. There are two storeys, attics and cellars, and the house consists of a rectangular block with two full-height gables at the front, and a gabled extension at the rear. There are five bays on the front, and two projecting chimney breasts. Most of the windows are mullioned and transomed, and the doorway has a segmental head and a fanlight.	II
Cottage at N.G.R. SJ 3274 2838; 52.84866°N 3.00003°W	—	Late 17th century	The cottage is timber framed with painted brick infill on a plinth, roughcast on the front and the left gable end, and with a slate roof. There is one storey and an attic, and three bays. The doorway has a gabled hood, in the ground floor is a horizontally-sliding sash window, and there are gabled eaves dormers. Inside, there are timber framed cross-walls.	II
Halston Hall, walls and balustrade 52.87836°N 2.98323°W	—	1690	A country house that has been altered and extended, it is in red brick on a moulded plinth, with chamfered angle quoins, a storey band, a moulded modillion eaves cornice, a parapet with ball finials, and a two-span slate roof with coped verges. There are two storeys, attics and cellars, and a front of nine bays, the middle five bays projecting under a pediment containing an oculus. The central porch has rusticated bands, a grooved lintel, a projecting keystone, and a segmental pediment containing a cartouche. The windows are sashes and there are segmental-headed dormers.There are flanking screen walls in red brick with stone dressings, they are semicircular and contain eleven blind round arches with pilasters and an entablature. At the rear is a balustrade.	I
St John the Baptist's Church; 52.87473°N 3.00258°W		1747	The oldest part of the church is the tower, the nave was added in 1805–06 by Thomas Harrison, the chancel, north aisle and vestry date from 1861, and the church was restored, and the chancel was extended in 1894. The church is built in red brick with sandstone dressings, and has a roof of tile and slate. It consists of a nave, a chancel, a north chancel aisle, a south vestry, and a west tower with flanking lean-to porches. The tower has four stages, stepped corner pilasters, a clock face on the south side, a dentilled cornice, and a pyramidal roof with a brass weathercock. The west doorway has a rusticated surround, and above it is a window with a moulded surround and fluted Roman Doric columns.	II
Stable block, gate piers and farm buildings, Halston Hall; 52.87838°N 2.98209°W	—	Mid 18th century	The stable block is in brick with slate roofs, two levels, and has a square plan around a central paved courtyard. On the roof is a lead-capped cupola with a bell and a weathervane, and a pyramidal capped wooden louvre. The gate piers are in sandstone, they are square, and have moulded plinths and capping and ball finials. The east range incorporates farm buildings.	II
Garden Cottage, walls and outbuilding 52.87993°N 2.99060°W	—	Late 18th century	The cottage is in red brick with a slate roof, two storeys and an attic, and three bays. The windows are sashes, there are two gabled dormers, and there is a single-storey lean-to on the right. The wall encloses the rectangular kitchen garden, which has an area of about 100 metres (330 ft) by 70 metres (230 ft). It is in red brick with stone coping and there are ball finials on the corners. The main entrance has square sandstone gate piers with moulded plinths and capping and ball finials. On the outside of the north wall is a range of lean-to outbuildings with casement windows, heating flues and a cast iron pump.	II
Ice house, Halston Hall; 52.87873°N 2.98447°W	—	Late 18th century (probable)	The ice house is in red brick and has a slate roof with a gable at the front and an apse at the rear, and is covered in earth. The doorway has an semicircular arch and flanking revetment walls, and it leads through a tunnel to an egg-shaped cavity.	II
Ye Olde Boote Inn; 52.87441°N 3.00249°W		Late 18th century	The house, later a public house, was extended to the left and to the rear in the 19th century. It is in red brick with a dentilled eaves cornice and a slate roof. There are two storeys, five bays, and two rear wings. The doorway has a bracketed gabled hood, and the windows are casements with segmental heads.	II
Lockgate Bridge; 52.87334°N 2.94018°W		c. 1796	The bridge carries a track over the Montgomery Canal. It is in red brick, and is a humpback bridge with a single elliptical arch. The bridge has a projecting keyblock, a string course, and a coped parapet ending in square corner piers.	II
Fernhill Hall; 52.88568°N 3.01062°W	—	1820s	A small country house, it is in Grinshill sandstone with a hipped slate roof. There are two storeys and three bays, the middle bay projecting under a pediment. In the centre is a portico with four Tuscan columns and an entablature. In the garden front is a full-height bay window. The windows are sashes, in the ground floor they are tripartite, with pedimented heads.	II
Highfields Farmhouse; 52.87590°N 3.00419°W	—	Early 19th century	The farmhouse, at one time an inn, is in red brick with a dentilled eaves cornice, and a roof of asbestos slate with coped verges on carved stone kneelers. There are two storeys, and an L-shaped plan, consisting of a three-bay front range, a lower range at right angles to the rear, and a two-storey lean-to. The central doorway has pilasters and panelled reveals, and the windows are sashes.	II
Hindford Grange; 52.89036°N 2.99092°W	—	Early 19th century	A red brick farmhouse with a dentilled eaves cornice and a slate roof. There are three storeys, three bays, and a wide gabled range and a two-storey lean-to at the rear. The central doorway has pilasters, panelled reveals and soffit, and a fanlight, and the windows are sashes.	II
Sundial; 52.87454°N 3.00272°W	—	Early 19th century	The sundial is in the churchyard of St John the Baptists's Church. It is in sandstone, and consists of a vase-shaped baluster with a moulded plinth and capping, on a base of three circular steps.	II
Crossing Cottage; 52.87314°N 3.01056°W	—	c. 1848	A level crossing keeper's cottage, it is in limestone with angle quoins, and a slate roof that has gables with fretted bargeboards and pointed finials. It is in Tudor Revival style, with two storeys and a cruciform plan. The doorway has a four-centred arch, and the windows are casements with cast iron lattice glazing.	II
White Gables; 52.87283°N 3.00960°W	—	c. 1848	A railway station, later a private house, it is stuccoed on a moulded stone plinth, and has a slate roof that has gables with cusped bargeboards, pointed finials and pendants, and is in Tudor Revival style. It has one storey and an attic, and two storeys in the central gable. The windows are cast iron mullioned and transomed with lattice glazing and moulded surrounds, there is an oriel window, and a gabled half-dormer. The porch has a round headed arch with Gothic tracery in the spandrels, blind round-arched arcading on the sides, and a doorway with a moulded surround.	II
Game larder, Halston Hall; 52.87835°N 2.98277°W	—	Late 19th century	The game larder is in red brick and has a hipped slate roof with a full-length louvred lantern. It has one storey and a rectangular plan, and it contains continuous wire-meshed windows, and a doorway.	II
