= Roger Dod =

Irish religious figure

Roger Dod, DD, Fellow of Pembroke Hall, Cambridge and Archdeacon of Salop, was Bishop of Meath from 6 November 1605 until his death on 27 July 1608.
