= Thomas Paul =

Thomas, Tommy or Tom Paul may refer to:

- Thomas Paul (priest), 18th century Irish Anglican priest
- Thomas Paul (Baptist minister) (1773–1831), Baptist minister and abolitionist who became the first pastor for the First African Baptist Church
- T. H. Paul (Thomas Haig Paul, 1820–1890), American locomotive manufacturer
- Tom Paul (politician) (1874–1964), New Zealand compositor, trade unionist, politician, editor, journalist and censor
- Tommy Paul (boxer) (1909–1991), American boxer
- Tom Paul (footballer) (1933–2015), English professional footballer
- Thomas Paul (bass) (born 1934), American bass and voice teacher
- Thomas Paul (footballer, born 1961), Swiss footballer
- Tommy Paul (tennis) (born 1997), American tennis player

== See also ==
- Paul Thomas (disambiguation)
