= Horace Carpenter (priest) =

The Ven. Horace John Carpenter (30 July 1887 – 26 June 1965) was Archdeacon of Salop, England, from 1945 to 1959.

Carpenter was educated at University College, London. His first post was a curacy at Christ Church, Penge. From 1915 to 1920 he was Resident Tutor at the London College of Divinity and a lecturer in Philosophy and Biblical Theology at London University. During this period he also served as a Chaplain to the British Armed Forces. He held incumbencies at Anerley (1920 to 1929); Wrangthorn (1929 to 1935); Walsall (1935 to 1943); and Penkridge (1943 to 1945). He was Examining Chaplain to the Bishop of Lichfield from 1937 and a prebendary of Lichfield Cathedral from 1938.
