= Robert Powell (priest) =

English Anglican priest (d. 1683)

- Born: Shropshire
- Died: 1683
- Education: Pembroke College, Cambridge
- Occupation: Priest

Robert Powell was an Anglican priest in England during the 17th century.

Powell was born in Shropshire. He was educated at Shrewsbury School and Pembroke College, Cambridge. He was incorporated at Oxford in 1649 and became a Fellow of All Souls. After The Restoration he became an Honorary Chaplain to the King. He held the living at Whittington, Shropshire from 1666 to 1681. He was also Archdeacon of Salop from 1666 and Chancellor of the Diocese of St Asaph from 1670, holding both positions until his death in 1683.
