= Jack Holt (footballer) =

Australian rules footballer

Personal information
- Full name: John Holt
- Born: 4 August 1883; Clifton Hill, Victoria
- Died: 20 October 1921 (aged 38); Caulfield, Victoria
- Height: 177 cm (5 ft 10 in)

Playing career^{1}
Years	Club	Games (Goals)
1905–06	Fitzroy	22 (2)
- ^{1} Playing statistics correct to the end of 1906.

Jack Holt (4 August 1883 – 20 October 1921) was an Australian rules footballer who played with Fitzroy in the Victorian Football League (VFL).
