= John Holt (businessman) =

English merchant (1841–1915)

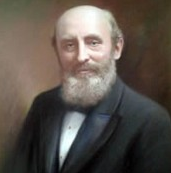
- An oil painting of John Holt by John A. A. Berrie
- Born: 31 October 1841; Garthorpe, Lincolnshire, England
- Died: 22 June 1915 (Age 73)
- Occupation: Merchant
- Known for: Founder of shipping company John Holt plc
- Spouse: Eliza Ball Longstaff (1848 - 1934)

John Holt (31 October 1841 – 22 June 1915) was an English merchant, who founded a shipping line operating between Liverpool and West Africa, and a number of businesses in Nigeria, which are now incorporated in John Holt plc.

== Life ==
Holt was born in Garthorpe, Lincolnshire in 1841 to the family of Thomas Godfrey Holt. In 1857, he began an apprenticeship with the firm of William and Hamilton Laird, a family business that was engaged in trade with West Africa through their agency with the African Steam Ship Company, founded by Macgregor Laird. During his time with the firm, Alfred Jones who later managed a shipping business with trade routes to West Africa was also working there. Holt's work with the Laird brothers introduced him to opportunities in West Africa that had arisen in the aftermath of the abolition of slavery.

In 1862, with £27 in his pocket, he sailed from Liverpool to take up an appointment as a shop assistant in a grocery store in Fernando Pó (now part of Equatorial Guinea) owned by the former British Consul on the Island, James Lynslager and formerly of John Beecroft, who had previously been a governor under the Spanish authorities. On Fernando Pó, Holt studied the produce and consumer trade business between England and West Africa. After saving most of his wages, he bought out the company after the death of his employer in 1864.

Initially, Holt stayed in West Africa and appointed an agent in Liverpool to sell produce and purchase consumer goods. He was joined by his brother Jonathan, and the two expanded their business interests in West Africa. In 1868, Holt's business expanded with the purchase of Maria, a sailing vessel built in 1852. The brothers very quickly came to dominate commercial trade in Cameroon, Gabon and the Spanish possessions on the mainland as well as Fernando Pó where he had begun his career. The company was organised as a partnership, John Holt and Company in 1884, and then later reorganised once more as a limited company John Holt & Co. (Liverpool) Ltd, in 1897.

In 1874, Holt returned to England and took over the Liverpool operations of the firm while his brother stayed in West Africa. He was co-founder of the Liverpool School of Tropical Medicine and in 1903, The Mary Kingsley Medal was instituted by Holt. It is awarded for outstanding contributions in the field of tropical medicine and is named in honour of Mary Kingsley.

A resident of Birkenhead (then part of the County of Cheshire) ever since he arrived there as an apprentice in his late teens, he was still living there with his family in the affluent suburb of Oxton in 1911. He shortly thereafter retired, following a severe stroke, to his home at Broughton Grange, Lincolnshire, where he died in 1915.
