= Halston Hall =

Building in Shropshire, England

Coordinates: 52.878267°N 2.983226°W

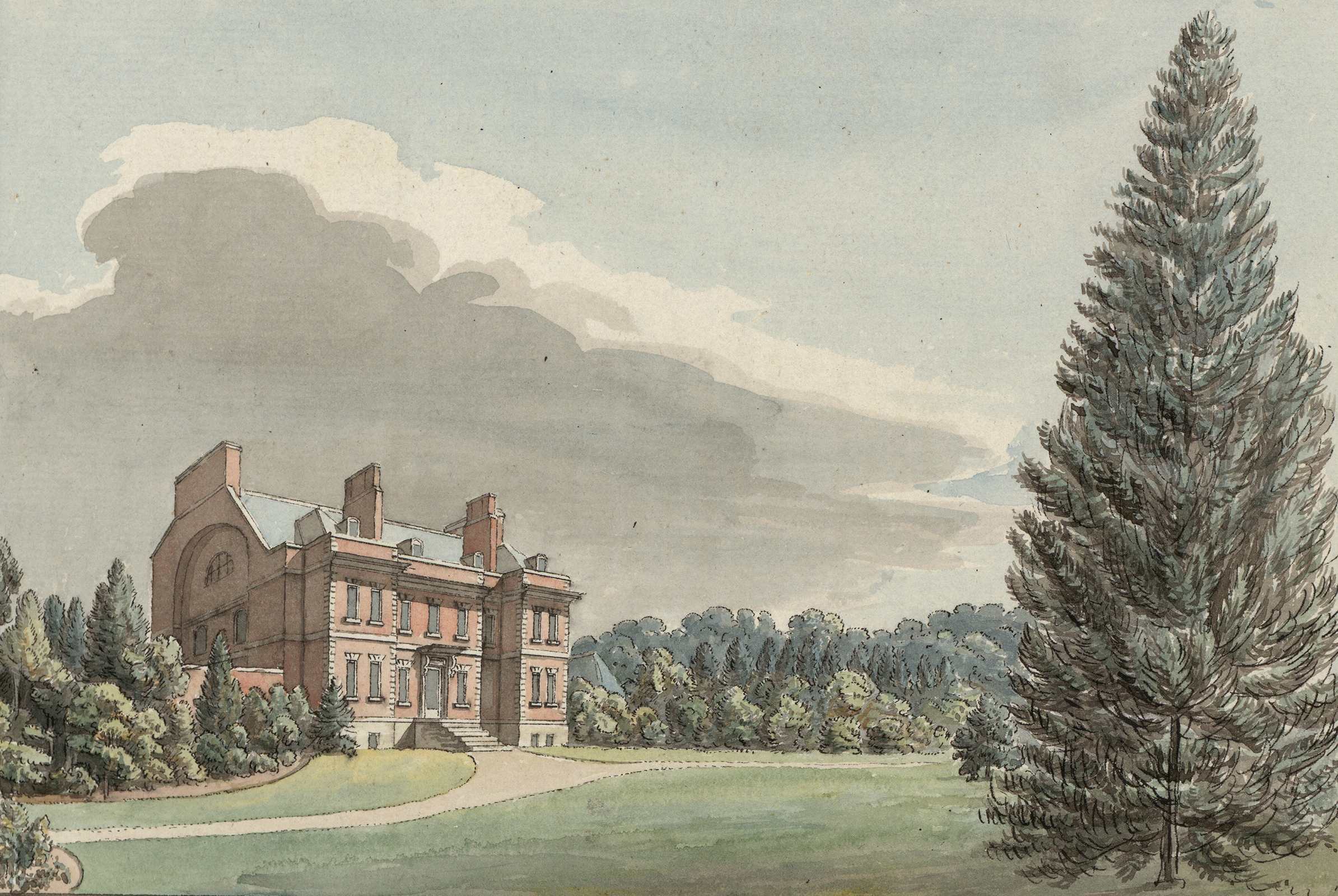
Halston Hall, Whittington in the 18th century

Halston Hall is a Grade I listed building in the parish of Whittington, Shropshire, England. A country house first built around 1690, it was given protected status in January 1952. Alterations were made to the structure for John Mytton by Robert Mylne around 1766-68 and further work was undertaken during the early- to mid-19th century, for some of which time the property was owned by his grandson, also called John but often referred to as "Mad Jack" Mytton.

Richard Mytton had been granted a five-year lease of the whole estate in April 1539 and required to live at Halston, to provide hospitality, and to find a priest for the chapel. The Mytton family was granted ownership of the Halston estates in 1562–63. The estate was split up for sale in 1847, 13 years after the death of Mad Jack. George Wright of Manchester bought the hall and 2,063 acres (835 ha) of the grounds for £116,095.

The nearby private timber-framed chapel is also Grade I listed. Its history is obscure but predates the current hall structure.

The parkland in which the hall is situated was requisitioned for use as a 1084-bed US military hospital during World War II. Little evidence of this survives but it comprised over 100 buildings, mostly to the north and north-west of the hall itself. The hospital was disused by 1954. Together with facilities at Penley, Llanerch Panna, Oteley Deer Park, and Iscoyd Park, it formed a part of US Army Hospital Center 804.

The site was visited by Time Team in 2023.

== See also ==
- Garth (Guilsfield)
- Grade I listed buildings in Shropshire
- Listed buildings in Whittington, Shropshire
- William Emes
