= Mytton and Mermaid Hotel =

House in Atcham, Shropshire, England

Coordinates: 52.6793°N 2.6797°W

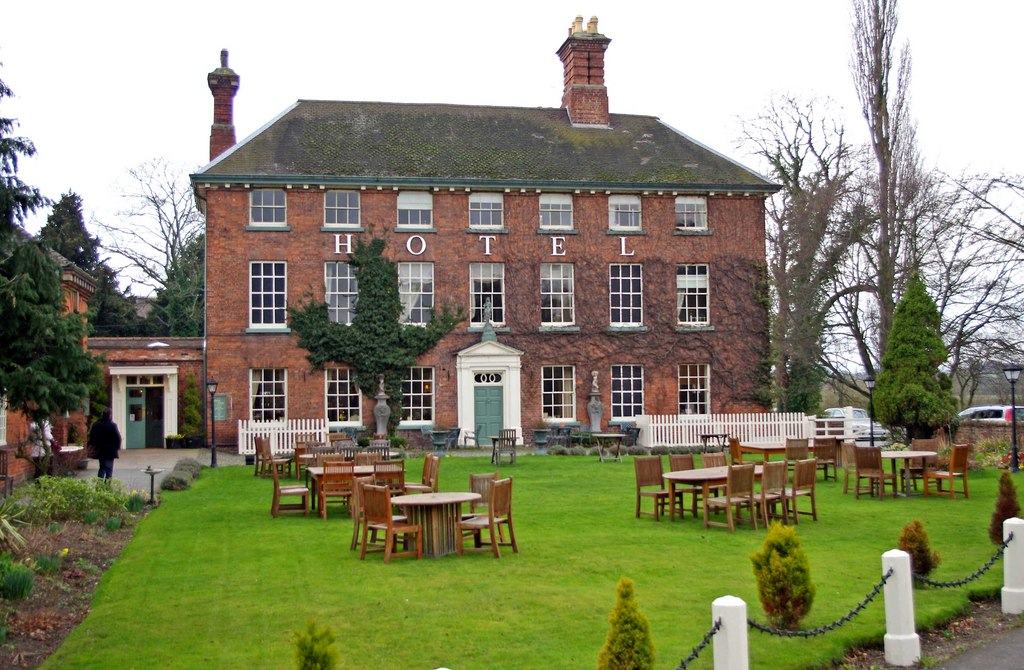
Mytton and Mermaid Hotel

The Mytton and Mermaid Hotel in the parish of Atcham, near Shrewsbury, England, is a Grade II listed building. It gained its protected status in 1952.

Originally built as a house, and later used as an inn and hotel, the structure of the Mytton and Mermaid dates from the mid- to late-18th century and was probably altered in the late 19th century. It was known as The Talbot Arms until the early 19th century. After a period under the name of The Berwick Arms, it became a private home called Atcham House. Clough Williams-Ellis bought it in the early 1930s, converting it back into a hotel and giving it the name by which it is now known.
