= George Frost (priest) =

English Anglican priest (1935–2026)

The Ven. George Frost (4 April 1935 – 16 June 2026) was an English Anglican priest. He served as Archdeacon of Salop from 1987 to 1998 and as the Archdeacon of Lichfield from 1998 until 2000.

Frost was born in Tottenham, North London. He was educated at Durham University and Lincoln Theological College; and ordained in 1961.

After serving a curacy at St Margaret's, Barking, he held incumbencies at Marks Gate, Tipton, Penn and Tong. He was appointed a prebendary of Lichfield Cathedral in 1985 and became Archdeacon of Salop in 1987. In 1998 he became Archdeacon of Lichfield, serving until his retirement in 2000.

Frost was married to Joyce, with whom he had four sons. He died on 16 June 2026.
