= Griffith Vaughan =

English Anglican clergyman

The Venerable Griffith Vaughan (1656-1726) was an English Anglican clergyman.

A son of Edmund Vaughan, of Pisford, Northamptonshire, plebeian, in 1668 he became a chorister at Magdalen College, Oxford, where he matriculated on 3 May, 1672, aged 16, and graduated B.A. in 1676. In 1681, he incorporated at Cambridge and graduated M.A. from Pembroke College, Cambridge. He held livings at Coppenhall, and Hinstock; and was Archdeacon of Ludlow from 1681 until his death.
