= Whittington, Shropshire =

Village in Shropshire, England

Coordinates: 52.874°N 3.003°W

Whittington
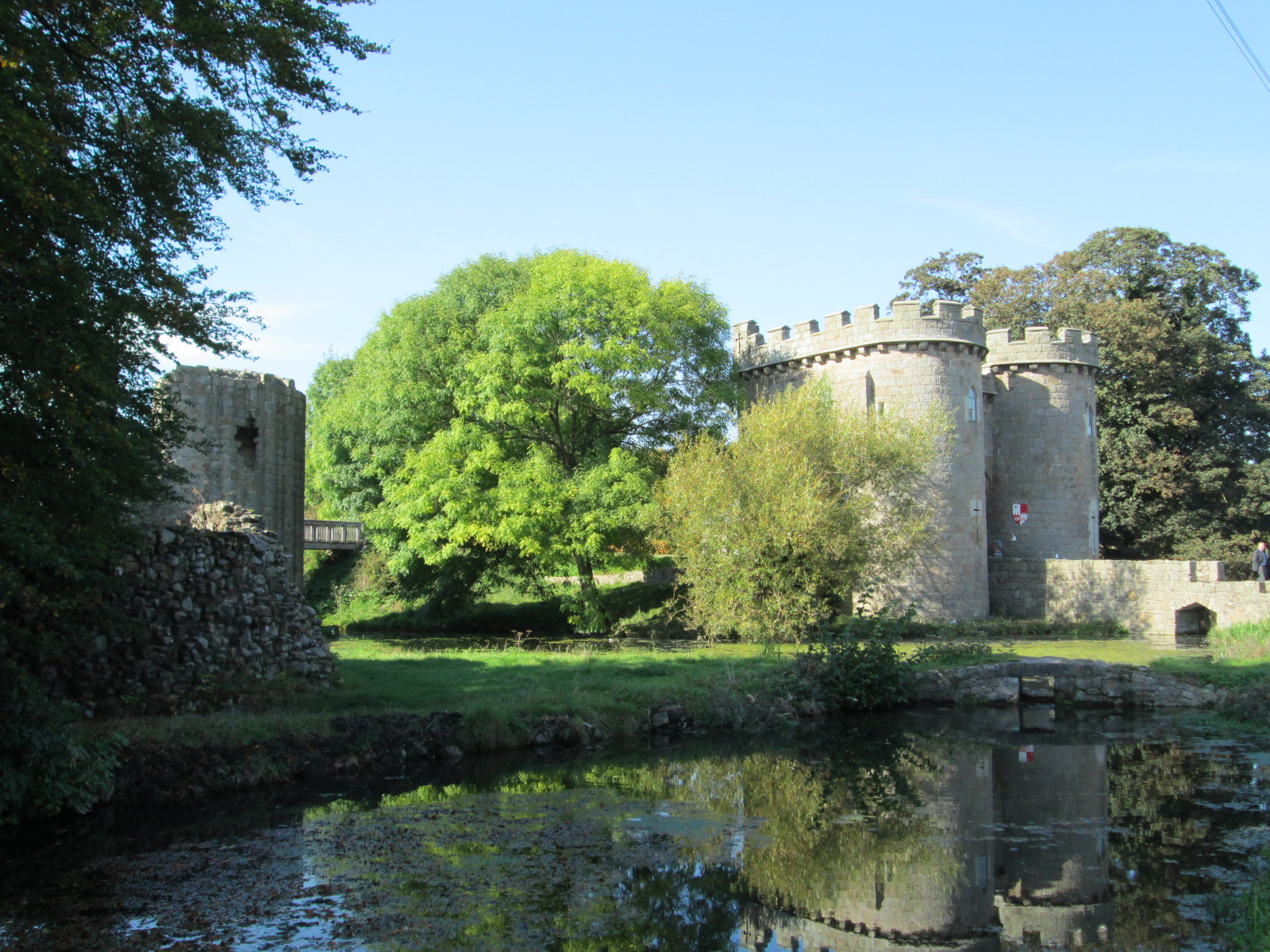
- Whittington Castle

- Location within Shropshire
- Population: 2,592 (2011)
- OS grid reference: SJ324312
- Civil parish: Whittington
- Unitary authority: Shropshire
- Ceremonial county: Shropshire
- Region: West Midlands
- Country: England
- Sovereign state: United Kingdom
- Post town: OSWESTRY
- Postcode district: SY11
- Dialling code: 01691
- Police: West Mercia
- Fire: Shropshire
- Ambulance: West Midlands
- UK Parliament: North Shropshire
- Website: Parish Council

Whittington is a village and civil parish in north west Shropshire, England, lying east and north-east of Oswestry. The parish had a population of 2,592 at the 2011 census. The village of Whittington is in the centre of the parish, and three smaller villages, Park Hall to its west, Hindford to the north-east and Babbinswood to the south, are also within the parish.

== History ==
Arms of FitzWarin: Quarterly per fess indented argent and gules

Whittington appears to have inhabited since prehistoric times and may have been a Dark Age fortress of some eminence, with an extensive settlement recorded in the Domesday Book of 1086. Whittington has been identified with Trefwen (white-town), the famous stronghold of Cynddylan king of Pengwern.

Whittington was granted to William Peverel probably in the summer of 1114 when King Henry I of England invaded Powys. William probably founded Whittington Castle which was taken from his descendants by the Welsh under Madog ap Maredudd of Powys and later granted to Roger Powys by King Henry II. It remained in the Powys family until King John granted it to the FitzWarin family, namely Fulk III FitzWarin (d.1258), whose life is recorded in a medieval romance.

In 1221, Henry III gave grudging permission for the castle to be re-built in stone after it had fallen to Llywelyn the Great. It was recaptured by Llywelyn in 1223 but was handed back the same year. It remained in the hands of the FitzWarins until 1420.

The castle ruins still exist today and were recently renovated. They are open to the public.

A small silver decorative brooch dating back to between 1115 and 1400 AD was discovered in a field outside Whittington in 2019.

The redbrick church of St Michael dates from 1894, and is on the site of a much older church.

== Governance ==
Whittington Parish Council is the first tier of local government, while most administrative functions are carried out by Shropshire Council, a unitary authority. Elections to both bodies are ordinarily held on the same day, every four years.

An electoral ward and an electoral division of the same name exists.
The ward stretches south to West Felton with a total population taken at the 2011 census of 4,067. The electoral division includes both Whittington parish and West Felton parish.

== Railways ==
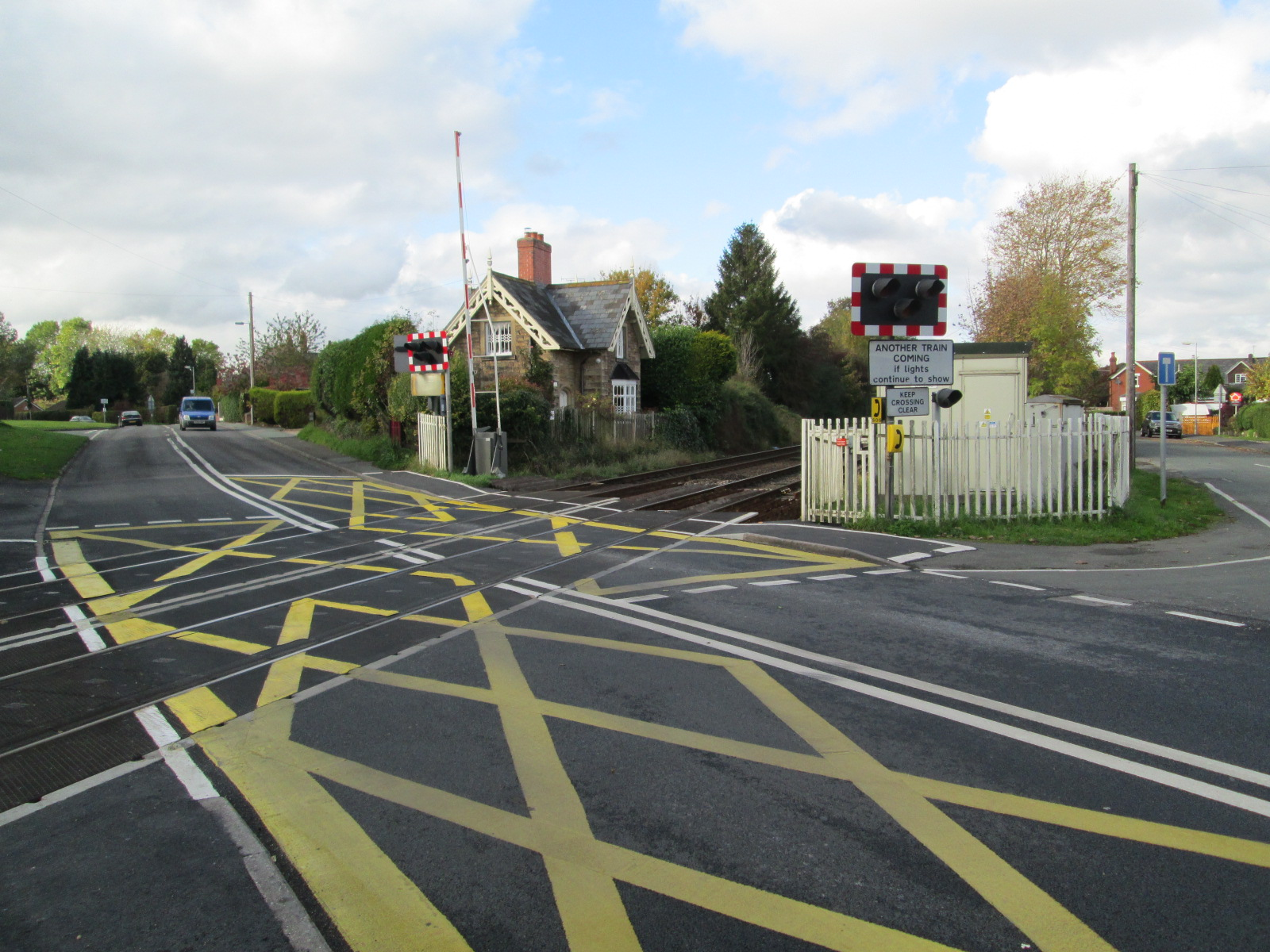
The A495 road crosses the Shrewsbury to Chester line on the edge of Whittington

Two railway stations once served Whittington. The Shrewsbury to Chester Line (via Wrexham), of the former Great Western Railway, is still an operating route, but Whittington Low Level station on this line closed on 12 September 1960 although there have been numerous campaigns over the years to have it reopened. Whittington High Level station was on the main line of the Cambrian Railways. However, the section from Whitchurch to Welshpool (Buttington Junction), via Ellesmere, Whittington, Oswestry and Llanymynech, closed on 18 January 1965 in favour of the more viable alternative route via Shrewsbury, although Whittington (High Level) station itself had closed earlier, on 4 January 1960.

== Present day ==
Whittington parish includes Park Hall. This was previously an army training camp, but now is residential and farming land.

There is a small amount of light industry based mainly on the Whittington Business Park on the road to Oswestry. A further group of businesses operate from premises off North Drive, Park Hall. Industry and warehousing is also located at the edge of the parish, close to the main A5 road.

The largest employer within the parish is BT (previously British Telecom) which has its National Network Management Centre on the Whittington Road, home of the UK's Speaking Clock.

== Notable people ==
- Robert Powell (died 1683), later Archdeacon of Salop, was Rector of Whittington 1666-1681.
- Robert Montgomery (1807-1855), poet, was parish curate at Whittington 1835-1836.
- Walsham How (1823–1897), later first Bishop of Wakefield and hymn writer, was Rector of Whittington 1851–1879.
- Reg Humphreys (1888-1967), professional footballer, played in League for Manchester City.

== See also ==
- Listed buildings in Whittington, Shropshire
- Halston Hall
