= John Holt (priest) =

English Anglican priest

The Venerable John Holt, DCL was an Anglican priest in England.

Hodges was born in Aston and educated at Christ Church, Oxford. He held the living at Ripple, Worcestershire and was Archdeacon of Salop from 1732 until his death in 1734.
