= Paul Richard Thomas =

French photographer (born 1977)

Paul Richard Thomas (born 1977) is a photographer known for his art, fashion, and beauty photography.

== Early years ==
Traveling with his parents (both university teachers), he spent his childhood in Thailand and in Egypt where his father offered him his first camera. Thomas started his career working as an illustrator for press and advertising, before transitioning to early photography for architecture and archaeology editorials. Focusing his creativity on aesthetics and on conceptual images, he quickly entered the world of fashion and beauty photography.

== Photography ==
Thomas' images immediately attracted exclusive clients, allowing him to collaborate with top models from major international agencies, prestigious brands, and household names. As his career in photography blossomed, he became known for covers, shot in his particular graphic style with international top models and actors such as Béatrice Dalle, Laura Smet, Helena Noguerra, Adriana Karembeu, Laura Paketova, Marie Gillain, Olga Kurylenko... His editorial work, recognizable by its graphic, strong, and conceptual sceneries lead him to partner with elite fashion and beauty companies, utilizing his own proprietary methods in pearly light imaging, which resulted in high demand for his specialized services. Paul Richard Thomas has captured in his lens top models and celebrities like Anja Rubik, Irina Pantaeva, Olga Pantushenkova, Tanja, Ruta Palionyte, Talitha Pugliesi, Angelica Boss, Zdenka Barkalova, Gabriela Gubert, Angelika Kallio, Vlada Roslyakova, Suzanne Bartsch, and Fatima Siad, just to name a few. Over the years, Thomas has collaborated with various fashion brands, including Cartier, Louis Vuitton, Tag Heuer, Givenchy, and Hermes, among others. The Chanel Group commissioned Thomas to create portraits of François Lesage, Isabel Marant, Anne Valérie Hash, Jérôme Dreyfus, Eymeric François, and Franck Sorbier. The latest Paul Richard Thomas exhibition in New York which took place in Bryant Park offers an introspective view and a thought-provoking commentary on society's perceptions of beauty and individuality, incorporating his sharp edge of surrealism.

== Filmmaking ==
Beyond the setting of editorials and advertisements, Thomas also worked on other commercial projects including directing TV ads and music videos. He has directed television commercials and music videos]] such as "Steps in the Dark", "It's Raining Tonight", "Right Your Role And It's Rock and Roll", "Tears Of Angels", "Yes A Day Has To Come", and "the Words of Love"...

== Music videos filmography ==
It's Raining Tonight

Right Your Role And It's Rock and Roll

Tears of Angel

The Words of Love

Yes A Day Has To Come
