= Archdeacon of Salop =

Church of England ecclesiastical office

The Archdeacon of Salop is a senior ecclesiastical officer in the Church of England Diocese of Lichfield.

== History ==
Shropshire was historically split between the diocese of Hereford (under the Archdeacon of Shropshire) and the diocese of Coventry and Lichfield (under the Archdeacon of Salop). The Shropshire archdeaconry in the Hereford diocese included the deaneries of Burford, Stottesdon, Ludlow, Pontesbury, Clun and Wenlock and the Salop archdeaconry in the Coventry and Lichfield diocese the deaneries of Salop and Newport.

In 1876, the archdeaconry of Shropshire became the archdeaconry of Ludlow, with the additional deaneries of Bridgnorth, Montgomery, Bishops Castle, Condover, and Church Stretton, which had been added in 1535. The archdeaconry of Salop, now entirely in the Lichfield diocese, includes the deaneries of Edgmond, Ellesmere, Hodnet, Shrewsbury, Telford, Wem, Whitchurch and Wrockwardine. Part of Welsh Shropshire was included in the diocese of St Asaph until the disestablishment of the Church in Wales (1920), comprising the deanery of Oswestry in the archdeaconry of Montgomery, and two parishes in the deanery of Llangollen and the archdeaconry of Wrexham. Certain parishes in Montgomeryshire chose to remain in the Hereford diocese.

== List of archdeacons ==
=== High Medieval ===
- bef. 1083–aft. 1087: Herbert Grammaticus
- bef. 1105–aft. 1105: Gilbert
- c. 1121–1180: Roger (I)
- bef. 1180–aft. 1190: Richard Peche (possibly son of the bishop)
- c. 1198–1212: Robert de Insula
- bef. 1212–aft. 1214: Thomas Nevil
- bef. 1215–aft. 1221: Ralph de Maidstone
- bef. May 1221–aft. 1 July 1232: Alexander of Swerford
- aft. 1232–bef. 1247: Walter of Kirkham
- bef. 1247–aft. 1256: Peter de Radnor
- bef. 1275–aft. 1275: Roger (II)
- bef. 1283–1294 (d.): William de Montfort (also Dean of St Paul's from 1283)

=== Late Medieval ===
- 15 January–bef. 21 January 1304 (d.): Philip de Cornubia
- 24 March 1304–aft. 1327: Richard de Bernard
- 29 September 1332–bef. 1339 (d.): Ralph de Normanville
- 22 January 1339–bef. 1360: William de Preston
- 14 September 1360 – 4 July 1379 (exch.): William de Shrouesbury
- 4 July 1379 – 31 May 1398 (exch.): John Knode
- 31 May 1398–bef. 1399 (d.): Philip Lee
- 14 March 1399–c. 1412 (exch.): William de Neuport/Newport (became Archdeacon of Carmarthen)
- 30 August 1402–bef. 1425 (d.): John Howbell
- 31 October 1425–bef. 1433 (res.): Thomas Chestrefeld or Wursop
- 17 August 1433 – 20 November 1436 (exch.): Gregory Newport
- 20 November 1436 – 5 May 1437 (exch.): John Weborn
- 5 May 1437–bef. 1450 (res.): Thomas Salisbury
- 22 May 1450–bef. 1464 (d.): Thomas Lye
- 1 June 1464 – 2 February 1483 (d.): John Fox
- ?–bef. 1485 (res.): Edmund Hals (became Archdeacon of Derby)
- 12 October 1485 – 30 January 1500 (d.): Richard Sherborne
- ?–bef. 1515 (d.): Adam Grafton (became Archdeacon of Stafford)
- 20 July 1515–bef. 1523 (d.): Joachim Bretunne
- bef. 1527–bef. 1536 (res.): Richard Strete
- 2 April 1536 – 1557 (res.): David Pole (also Archdeacon of Derby from 1542; became Bishop of Peterborough)

=== Early modern ===
- 15 January 1558–?: William Hill
- 1560–bef. 1579 (d.): Thomas Bolt
- 26 October 1579 – 1598 (res.): Godfrey Goldsborough (became Bishop of Gloucester)
- 16 November 1598 – 1605 (res.): Roger Dod (became Bishop of Meath)
- 1606–bef. 1613 (res.): Valentine Cary (became Dean of St Paul's)
- 1613–1628 (d.): Thomas Master
- 10 September 1628–bef. 1642 (d.): William Jeffrey
- ?–bef. 1663 (d.): William Arnway
- 11 February 1663–bef. 1681 (d.): Robert Powell
- 18 July 1681–bef. 1726 (d.): Griffith Vaughan
- 5 October 1726–?: Samuel Garret
- 19 July 1732–bef. 1734 (d.): John Holt
- 13 March 1735 – 29 June 1770 (d.): William Vyse
- 15 August 1770 – 17 September 1798 (d.): Egerton Leigh (whose father Egerton Leigh had been Archdeacon of Shropshire in Hereford diocese)
- 17 October 1798 – 24 December 1821 (res.): John Woodhouse (also Dean of Lichfield from 1807)
- 27 December 1821 – 23 December 1827 (d.): Hugh Owen
- 28 February 1828 – 3 October 1847 (d.): Edward Bather
- 15 December 1847 – 23 March 1886 (res.): John Allen

=== Late modern ===
- 1886–1896 (d.): Thomas Lloyd
- 1896–1916 (ret.): Charles Maude
- December 1916 – 1946 (ret.): Horace Lambart (afterwards archdeacon emeritus)
- 1945–1959 (ret.) Horace Carpenter (afterwards archdeacon emeritus)
- 1959–1979 (ret.): Sidney Austerberry (afterwards archdeacon emeritus)
- 1980–1987 (res.): Bob Jeffery (became Dean of Worcester)
- 1987–1998 (res.): George Frost (became Archdeacon of Lichfield)
- 1999–2011 (ret.): John Hall
- 2011–2024 (res.): Paul Thomas (made to resign after misconduct)
- 4 May 2025 – present: Nick Watson

== Sources ==
- Le Neve, John; Hardy, Sir Thomas Duffus (1854). Archdeacons of Salop (Chapter). Fasti ecclesiae Anglicanae. Vol. 1 (1854 ed.). Oxford: Oxford University Press. pp. 573–4 – via Wikisource.
- Jones, B. (1964), Fasti Ecclesiae Anglicanae 1300–1541, vol. 10, pp. 17–18
- Horn, Joyce M. (2003), Fasti Ecclesiae Anglicanae 1541–1857, vol. 10, pp. 12–14
