= Paul Thomas (priest) =

UK Anglican priest (1955-)

Paul Wyndham Thomas (born 22 April 1955, in Llantwit Major, Vale of Glamorgan) is an Anglican priest, who was Archdeacon of Salop from 2011 to 2024.

Thomas was educated at Cardiff High School, Oriel College, Oxford, and Wycliffe Hall, Oxford. He was ordained deacon in 1979, and priest in 1980. After a curacy at Llangynwyd with Maesteg, he was Team Vicar of Langport from 1985 to 1990. He was Priest in charge of Thorp Arch and Walton from 1990 to 19; Vicar of Nether with Upper Poppleton from 1993 to 2004; Parish Development Advisor for the Diocese of Lichfield from 2004 to 2011; and Priest in charge of Forton since 2011.

On 23 March 2024 it was announced that he been made to resign and been banned from ministry for three years after admitting an "inappropriate relationship".
