= John Holt (15th-century judge) =

English judge

John Holt (died 1418) was an English judge of the common pleas who was a native and landowner of Northamptonshire. His name occurs in the year-books from 1366, the fortieth year of Edward III, onwards.

== Life ==
In 1377, the last year of the reign of Edward III, he became a King's Serjeant. He was appointed a judge of the common pleas in 1383 (Cal. Rot. Parl. p. 208), and at Christmas 1384 he was made a Knight banneret. On 25 Aug. 1387 he was summoned to attend the king at Nottingham and concurred with his colleagues in pronouncing illegal the proceedings of the last parliament, which had appointed a permanent council. For this expression of opinion he was on 3 February 1388 arrested while sitting in court, and on 2 March was put on his trial. He pleaded that he had been compelled to give that opinion by the threats of the Archbishop of York and of the Earl of Suffolk, but he was found guilty by parliament. Upon the intercession of the prelates, his life was spared, and his sentence commuted to banishment for life to Ireland, an allowance of forty marks being made him for his residence at Drogheda. In 1391 his manors were granted to his son John, but in January 1397 parliament remitted his banishment, and in the following year his sentence was reversed and his land was restored. The deposition of Richard II prevented him from recovering the lands. In the second year of the following reign he presented a petition for their restoration, which was granted, but many of them having been granted away in the interim he was compelled to allow the grantees such compensation as the council should think reasonable, and on these terms his lands were restored to him, and passed to his son Hugh on his death in 1418.

Holt's dealings with the manor of Whilton in Northamptonshire is discussed by Robert Palmer in his book 'The Whilton Dispute, 1264-1380: A Social-Legal Study of Dispute Settlement in Medieval England'.
