= John Holt plc =

Nigerian conglomerate

Coordinates: 6°35′51″N 3°22′11″E

John Holt
- The logo of John Holt consists of a brass manilla, previously used in some parts of Nigeria as currency and a five-point star, which signifies the group's enduring connection with Liverpool.
- Type: Public (RC2662)
- Industry: Conglomerate
- Founded: 1897
- Headquarters: Lagos, Liverpool
- Key people: John Holt – founder
- Revenue: 12 billion NGN (2006)
- Number of employees: 1,200 (2006)
- Website: jhplc.com

John Holt plc is a Nigerian conglomerate that participates in many areas of the economy. The Nigerian company is a subsidiary of John Holt & Co. (Liverpool) Ltd, a British company. A minority of the shares are traded on the Nigerian Stock Exchange.

== History ==
=== Origins ===
The company traces its origins to 1862 when John Holt, 20 years old at the time, with £27 in his pocket, sailed from Liverpool to take up an appointment as a shop assistant in a grocery store in Fernando Po (now part of Equatorial Guinea). Five years later, he bought out his employer, and he was joined by his brother Jonathan. In 1868, Jonathan bought a schooner, which enabled the brothers to open more trading posts in West Africa. In 1874 the brothers opened an office in Liverpool. In 1881, John entered the palm oil trade.

In 1884, the brothers formed a partnership, John Holt and Company, to consolidate their business interests. Subsequently, John entered into new partnerships, including a venture in Lagos in Nigeria in 1887.

=== The Liverpool company ===
In 1897, the partnerships were absorbed into a new limited company, John Holt & Co. (Liverpool) Ltd. The company built up an extensive produce trade, in which palm oil, palm kernels, rubber and cocoa were exported from Nigeria to England. Imports included textiles from Lancashire and bicycles from Birmingham. A fleet of ships operated a fortnightly service from Liverpool to West Africa and the Company also had its own fleet of river craft.

Apart from produce and merchandise, these river craft also carried cash. Where banks did not exist, John Holt had strongrooms. Even after banks were established, many Nigerians preferred to deposit their cash with John Holt.

In 1970, the company was taken over by Lonrho. In 2001, Lonrho sold the company to a management-led group of investors.

=== The Nigerian company ===
In 1961, the Liverpool company formed a locally incorporated subsidiary in Nigeria, John Holt Limited, to hold its Nigerian interests. It became a public company and was quoted on the Nigerian Stock Exchange in May 1974.

== The company today ==
The company's businesses in Nigeria include the assembly and distribution of power generators, leasing, distribution of fire-fighting equipment, logistics, boat building and fabrication of industrial and agricultural equipment.

The parent company in Liverpool is involved in the procurement and finance of exports.
