= Sidney Austerberry =

The Ven. Sidney Denham Austerberry (28 October 1908 - 22 March 1996) was Archdeacon of Salop from 1959 to 1979.

Austerberry was educated at Hanley High School and Egerton Hall, Manchester. He was ordained deacon in 1931 and priest in 1933. After a curacy in Newcastle-under-Lyme, he held incumbencies in Shrewsbury, Brewood and Great Ness. He was Rural Dean of Penkridge from 1958 to 1959; and an Honorary Canon of Lichfield Cathedral from 1968 to 1979.
